= Governor of Rio Grande do Sul =

Head of Government of Rio Grande do Sul

- Governor of Rio Grande do Sul State Pavilion

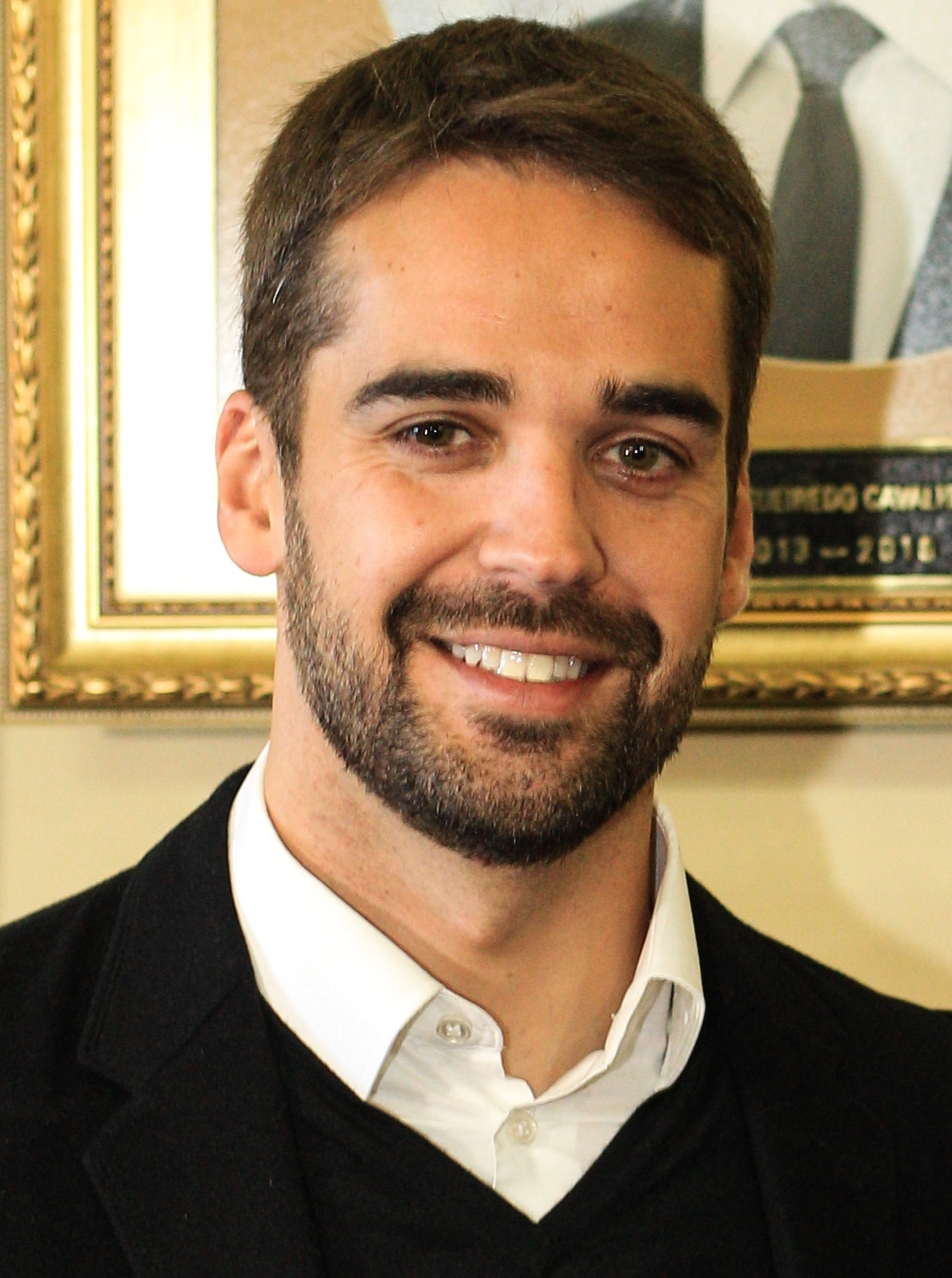
- Incumbent; Eduardo Leite since January 1, 2023
- Style: Your Excellency
- Residence: Piratini Palace
- Term length: Four years, renewable once consecutively
- Formation: February 19, 1737
- First holder: José da Silva Pais
- Succession: By universal suffrage
- Deputy: Vice Governor
- Salary: R$25,429.70 (Note: This value refers to the gross monthly salary. in)
- Website: estado.rs.gov.br

The governor of Rio Grande do Sul is the head of government of the state's executive branch, assisted by his secretaries, whom he freely chooses. Elected by absolute majority in universal suffrage, together with the vice-governor, his term lasts four years; since 1997, reelection has been possible, and although all have sought it, none has succeeded. The current governor is Eduardo Leite, since January 1, 2023.

The governor's place of work and residence is the Piratini Palace, built in the 20th century in Porto Alegre, the state capital. His powers are listed in the state and federal constitutions, which include the ability to sanction and veto bills passed by the Legislative Assembly, present budget proposals, issue decrees and regulations, and appoint occupants of hundreds of positions. As the commander in chief of the state security forces, he appoints the commanders and senior officers of the Military Brigade, the Civil Police, and the Fire Department.

The position has its origins in the 18th century. The first governors had broad powers, ranging from military to judicial functions. The Portuguese monarchy chose the region's administrators from 1737 until Brazil's Independence in 1822, when the province's governors were appointed by the Emperor. After the Proclamation of the Republic in 1889, the state began to directly elect its governors, except in dictatorial times. The term "governor" has been in use uninterruptedly since the 1930s, but had already been used from 1761 to 1809. Two governors of Rio Grande do Sul were presidents of Brazil: Deodoro da Fonseca and Getúlio Vargas.

== Position ==
=== Roles and authority ===
To bring the Constitution of Rio Grande do Sul in line with the New Republic, a State Constituent Assembly enacted a new constitutional text for the state in 1989. The legislation deals with the Executive Branch in its chapter II, sections I, II and III. Constitutionally, the governor is the highest representative of the state executive branch, exercising the "superior direction of the state administration" with the assistance of his secretaries, whom he appoints and dismisses as he sees fit. The number of secretaries is not specified by law; in 2019, Rio Grande do Sul had 23 state secretaries. (Note: The number of secretaries has varied in the last governments. Governor José Ivo Sartori's cabinet had 17 secretaries, Tarso Genro's had 29, Yead Crusius' 18 and Germano Rigotto's 22) Exercising the highest office in the politics of Rio Grande do Sul, the governor represents the state in political, legal, and administrative actions.

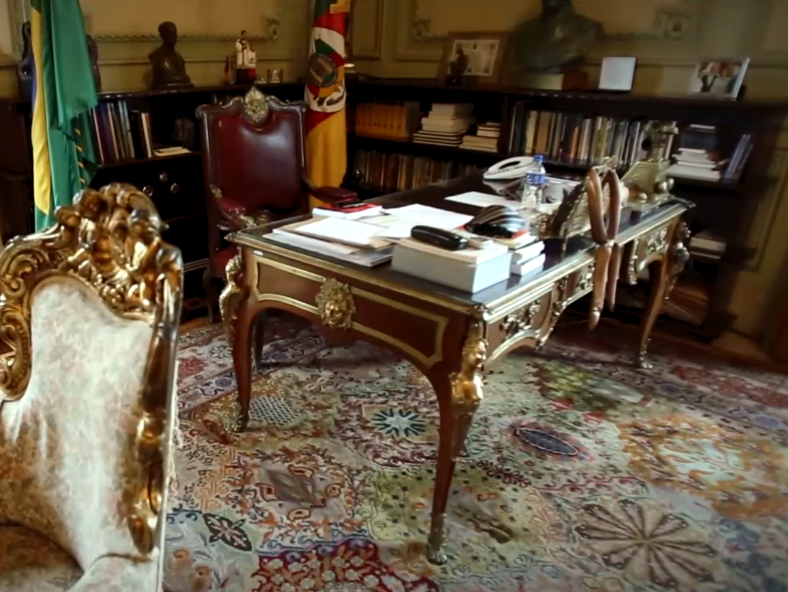
The office of the governor of Rio Grande do Sul, at the Piratini Palace, in 2016

Of the bills approved by the Legislative Assembly, the governor has the prerogative to enact or veto them, totally or partially, if he judges it "unconstitutional or contrary to the public interest. (Note: If he does not sanction or veto within 15 days, "the governor's silence will import sanction" [of the bill] in) The deputies can overturn a veto by an absolute majority of its members. During the opening of the legislative session, he sends the state deputies a message about the state of the state and his government's plans. The governor can also influence the legislative process by calling extraordinary sessions and proposing bills, including urgent ones. There are laws whose authorship is his exclusive initiative, such as the ones that provide for the Military Brigade's staff and the attributions and structure of the state public administration.

The governor sets the annual budget, but must submit it to the Legislative Assembly. The state deputies deliberate on the year plan, the budget guidelines law, and the annual budget law proposed by the governor. In 2017, the budget approved by the deputies for the year 2018 forecasted a revenue of R$63.2 billion, against R$70.1 billion in expenditures. Of this total, the Federal Constitution determined that at least 12% of spending should be allocated to health and 25% to education. The 2019 budget estimated that spending on civil service would represent 82% of net current revenue; security, education, and health were the areas with the largest budgets. As the most indebted state in the country, every budget since 2010 has shown a public deficit.

The governor can "issue decrees and regulations for the faithful execution of the laws," including those that deal with states of emergency, be they financial or caused by natural disasters or climatic events. In doing so, and if recognized by the federal government, the governor can count on a line of support from the Union, which includes financial resources and the sending of the National Force. The governor is also responsible for decreeing and executing an intervention at the municipal level.

It is up to the governor to appoint the occupants of various positions. In 2016, the state executive had 1,941 employees in commissioned positions, a legal regime that allows the governor to freely hire and fire their holders. That year, the governor's office had 75 commissioned positions. The governor appoints, through a triple list submitted by the Court of Justice, the judges, and chooses the members of the Court of Auditors. As supreme authority of the Military Brigade, Civil Police and Fire Brigade, he has the power to dispose of positions and appoint senior officers.

The governor also has other legal attributions. The Federal Constitution established governors as legitimate parties to file direct actions of unconstitutionality and declaratory actions of constitutionality before the Supreme Court; the State Constitution allows them to file actions of unconstitutionality of state and municipal laws or norms before the Court of Justice. Its functions also include awarding decorations and honorary distinctions.

=== Election and Induction ===
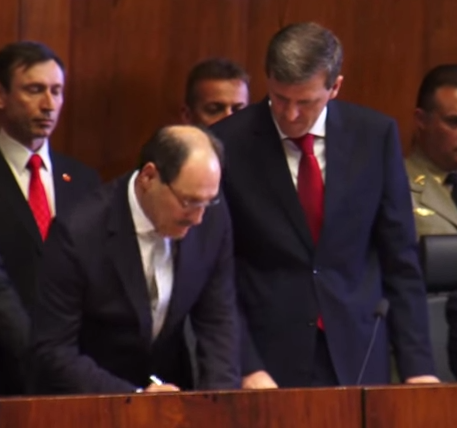
José Ivo Sartori being sworn in as governor, in 2015

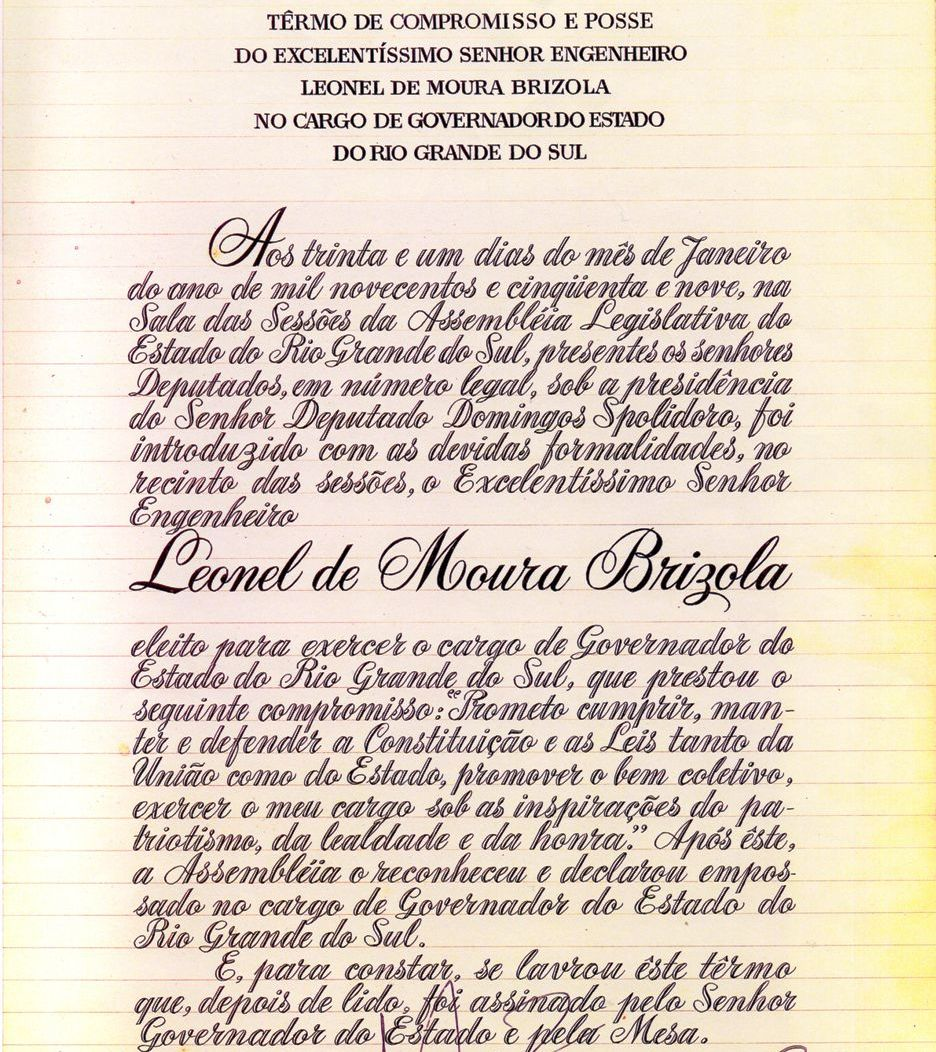
Term of office of governor Leonel Brizola, in 1959

The eligibility criteria for the position were defined by the Federal Constitution, and include the need for the candidate to have Brazilian nationality, be at least 30 years old, be affiliated to a political party, have his or her electoral domicile in the state, and be in full exercise of political rights. The candidate cannot be a spouse or relative to the second degree of the president or the incumbent governor. (Note: Daughter of Governor Tarso Genro, this rule prevented the candidacy of Luciana Genro for the City Council of Porto Alegre in 2012. in)

The governor and vice governor are elected by universal suffrage in elections held in the last month of October before the expiration of their predecessors' terms. The first round of voting takes place on the first Sunday in October, and if no candidate obtains a supermajority of the votes, a second round of voting takes place on the last Sunday in October. The term of office is four years, with the possibility of one consecutive re-election.

After the results are compiled, the Regional Electoral Court of Rio Grande do Sul decides on the diplomation of the person elected, enabling him/her to take office on January 1. The elective mandate can be challenged before the Electoral Court within fifteen days after the diplomatic nomination, and evidence of economic power abuse, corruption, or fraud must be presented.

The inauguration ceremony is held in the Legislative Assembly, where the governor-elect takes the following oath:

I promise to uphold, defend, and fulfill the Constitution, observe the laws, and sponsor the common good of the people of Rio Grande do Sul.

The governor then walks to the Piratini Palace, where, in the Negrinho do Pastoreio Room, the inauguration takes place. (Note: This script was used in the inaugurations of Eduardo Leite (2019), Sartori (2015) and Genro (2011)) If the inauguration does not take place within ten days of the scheduled date, the position is declared vacant by the legislature.

=== Dismissal and succession ===
The governor has two types of privileged jurisdiction. In cases of common crimes that occurred during the governor's term in office, the governor is prosecuted and tried by the Superior Court of Justice. In some states there has been an attempt to include the requirement of authorization from the Legislative Assembly for criminal proceedings to be brought against the governor by the Superior Court of Justice. The Supreme Federal Court unanimously concluded that the filing of a criminal action does not automatically remove the governor from office, and that it is up to the SCJ to "decide, with reasons, on the application of precautionary criminal measures, including removal from office". The Superior Court of Justice, in turn, decided that it would judge governors only for crimes committed during their term of office and related to the exercise of their office.

The Legislative Assembly is responsible for prosecuting the governor for crimes of responsibility; a request for impeachment can be presented by any Brazilian citizen with political rights. The president of the legislature initially decides whether to file it or approve it. (Note: In both cases, it is up to all deputies to make the final decision on the admissibility of the request.) If initiated, a parliamentary commission issues an opinion regarding its admissibility, which is submitted to the full legislature. With the approval of two-thirds of the deputies, the process is opened and the governor is temporarily removed from office. (Note: The removal of the governor lasts a maximum of 180 days. If the trial is not concluded within this period, the governor returns to office with the regular processing of the case.) In the trial, a mixed commission is formed with five deputies and five judges drawn by lot, presided over by the president of the Court of Justice. If two-thirds of the members of the commission vote in favor, the governor is removed from office. No Rio Grande do Sul governor has ever had his mandate revoked.

The first in the line of succession is the vice-governor, who takes office either temporarily or permanently. If both are vacant, the governorship is exercised by the presidents of the Legislative Assembly and the Court of Justice, respectively. A new election is called if the governor and vice-governor posts become vacant up to one year before the end of the four-year term; those elected will hold office for the remainder of the term. Also, before leaving the country or the state for more than ten days, the governor must request a leave of absence from the state deputies, under penalty of losing the office.

=== Compensations ===
==== Official residences ====
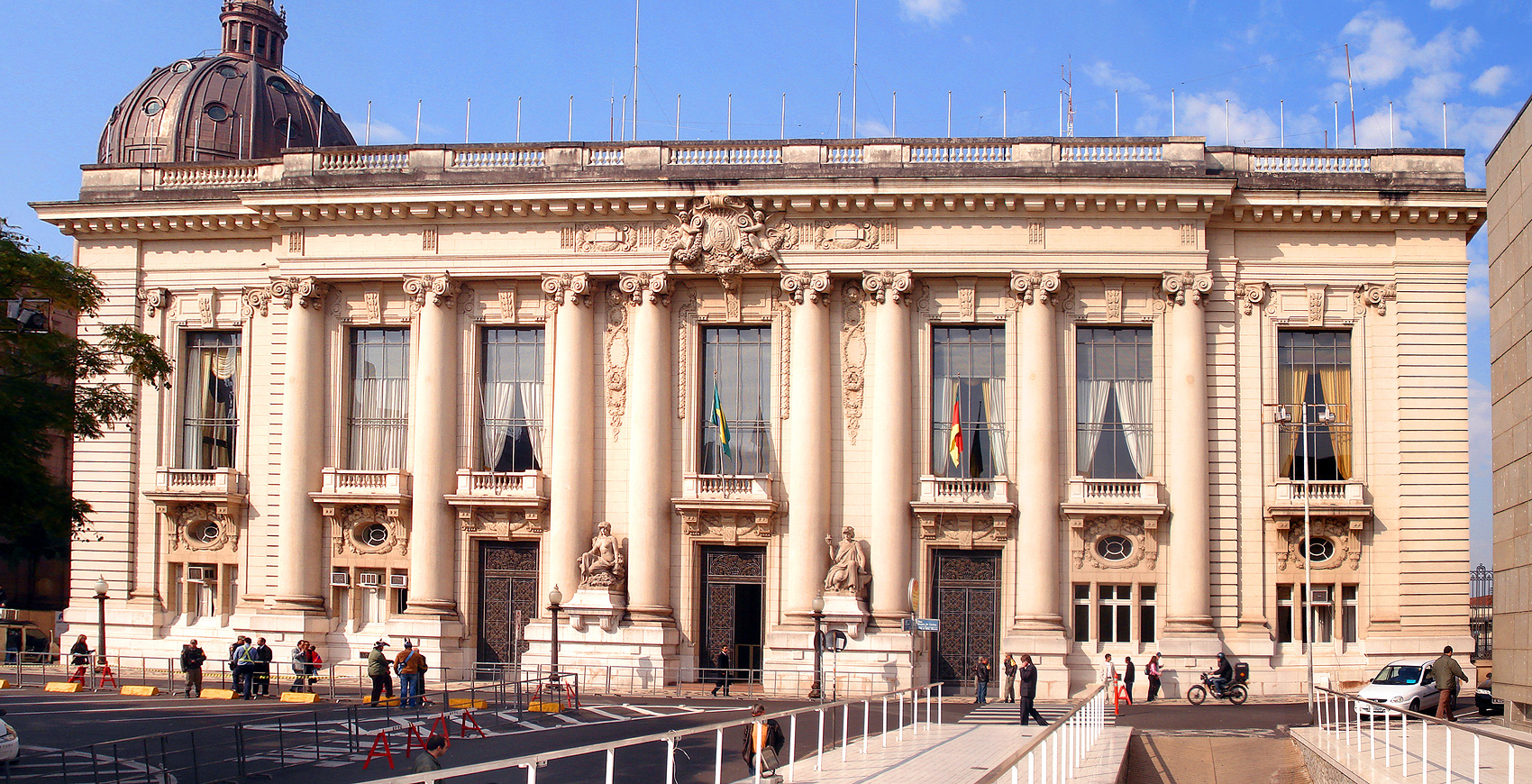
Piratini Palace in 2007.

Located in the Historic District of Porto Alegre, the state capital, the Piratini Palace is the seat of Executive Power. Neoclassical in style, it was built to celebrate the Republic, as Júlio de Castilhos wished, with material from France and cement from England, and was partially inaugurated in 1921. In addition to the workplace, all of Rio Grande do Sul's governors lived in the palace's residential wing until 1986. (Note: Pedro Simon chose to continue living in his apartment. In the following years, Antônio Britto, Rigotto, Crusius, Genro and Sartori also chose not to reside in the executive headquarters, unlike Olívio Dutra and Leite, who lived in the Piratini.) Protected by the Institute of Historic and Artistic Heritage of Rio Grande do Sul and the National Institute of Historic and Artistic Heritage, the palace became the symbol of the Executive Power of Rio Grande do Sul.

Before Piratini, the Clay Palace was the seat of government from 1789 to 1896. The building was constructed on the same site as Piratini, the Marechal Deodoro Square, with adobe, which explains the origin of its name and results, according to historian Sérgio da Costa Franco, in a "colonial large house". At the end of the 19th century, the palace was in a very bad state of conservation; it was demolished in 1896 and the Apache Fort, also in the Marechal Deodoro Square, was the seat of government until Piratini was inaugurated.

The Hortensias Palace, opened in 1954 in the city of Canela, is the official summer residence of the governor. Rarely used, hosting only sporadic meetings, during the Sartori government it was discussed the sale of the palace, which was evaluated at R$27.1 million, but the proposal did not advance. The governor also has at his disposal the White House, located in the Assis Brasil Exhibition Park, where the Expointer agricultural and livestock fair is held, in Esteio.

==== Salary ====
The governor of Rio Grande do Sul gross monthly salary is R$25,429.70, with R$18,084.78 being the net salary. (Note: April 2019 data obtained from the Transparency Portal of Rio Grande do Sul.) It was, in 2013, the eighteenth highest for the position in the country. According to the Federal Constitution, the governor's salary serves as a salary ceiling for the state executive branch, being "forbidden to add any bonus, additional, representation allowance or other remuneration". The last salary adjustment occurred in early 2015, with a 45.97% increase, slightly below inflation. Until 2015, those elected to office, or their widows, received a lifetime salary equivalent to the federal ceiling (R$30,471.11 at the time); that year, the deputies changed the legislation, reducing the benefit to up to four years after the end of the term, as well as excluding widowers. In 2018, the state was the second in the country that spent the most on alimony for former governors.

==== Security ====
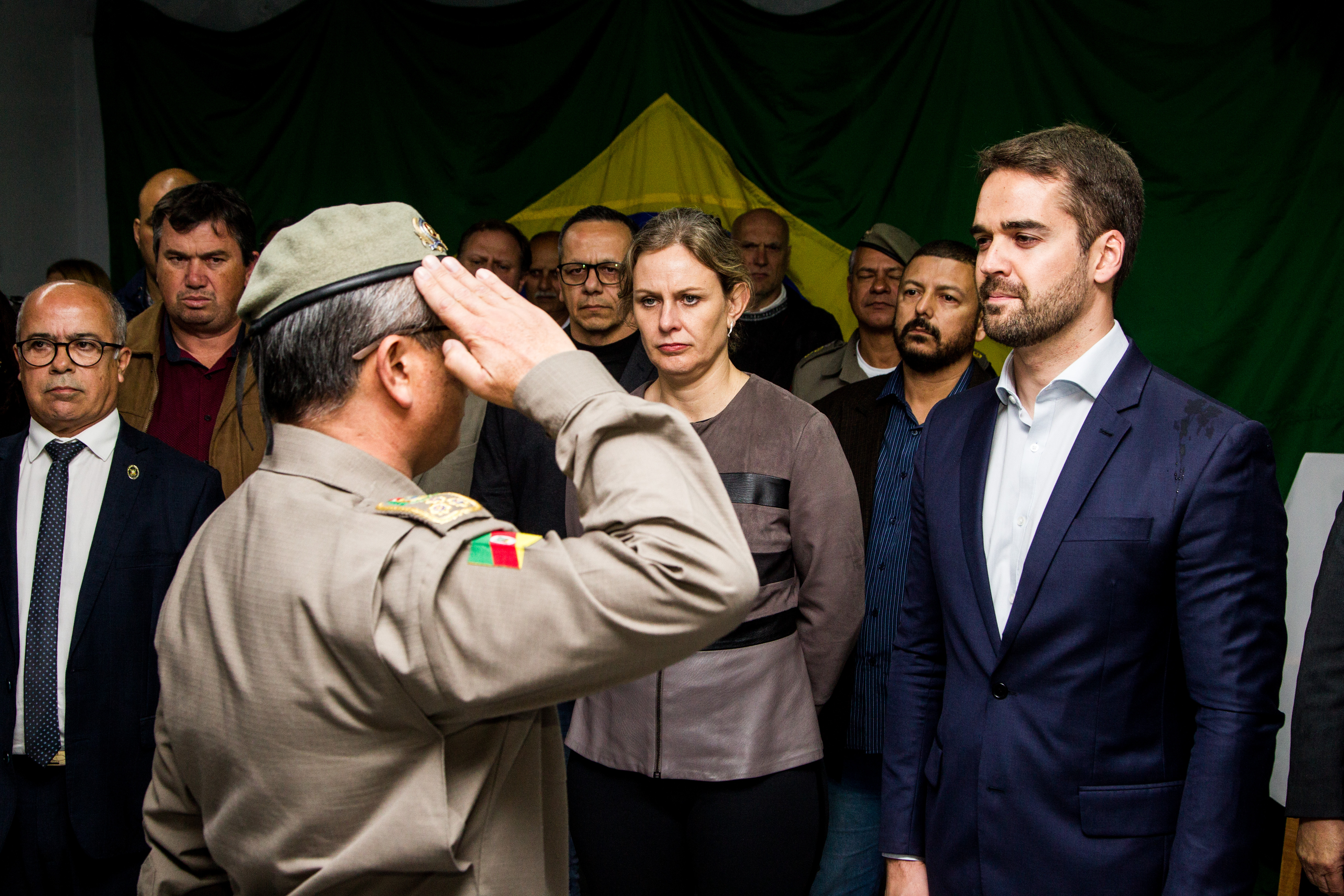
Military Brigade of Rio Grande do Sul paying salute to Governor Eduardo Leite in 2019.

The Military Brigade deploys part of its personnel to provide full-time security for the governor. The Military House has the legal task of looking after the governor's military and personal security, as well as that of his family members. The governor can't waive his personal security, and as a safety measure he can't drive. If he travels to another state, it is possible that the Military House of that state will be responsible for his security - and vice versa.

==== Transportation ====
The governor has at his disposal a twin-engine Super King Air B200 turboprop, used for longer trips, and four helicopters (two Eurocopter AS350 Écureuil and two AW 119 Koala), which are also used by the state executive for other purposes. In 1931, Governor Flores da Cunha bought a used American-made Stutz Model M convertible; at the time, a Ford Model 1919 was the governor's official vehicle. The Stutz transported several authorities, including Portuguese President Francisco Craveiro Lopes; it was later rebuilt and continued to be used on commemorative dates such as the Farroupilha Week parades in 2008. Both the Stutz and the Ford were put on display at the Piratini Palace.

== Background ==
=== Colonial Period ===
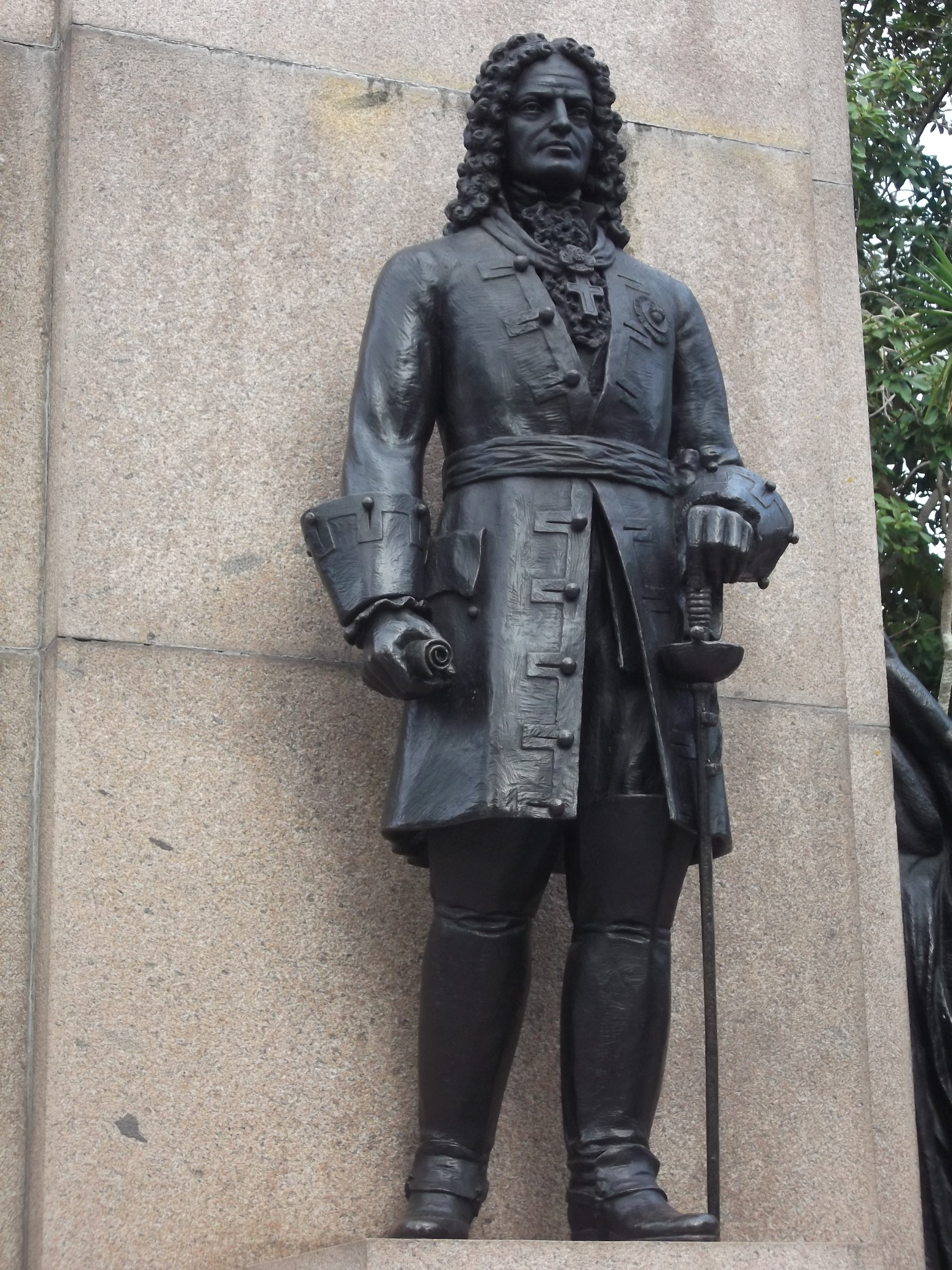
Statue of José da Silva Pais, first military commander of Rio Grande

The first direct rulers of the region now known as Rio Grande do Sul were the leaders of the Military Command of Rio Grande, a post inaugurated by José da Silva Pais in 1737, initiating the organization of the new settlement's defense. At the time, the Portuguese crown moved its troops to protect the Colonia del Sacramento, frequently threatened by Spanish troops. Aided by a council of officers, in the early years the commanders had great decision-making power, with functions that included the administration of justice and the budget, land division, dealing with the natives, territorial expansion, and the application of penalties. These attributions were progressively delegated with the development of public administration. This system was in use until 1761, a period in which the state had four governors, Diogo Osório Cardoso being the one who remained in office the longest, from 1740 to 1752.

In 1760, Rio Grande de São Pedro became a captaincy, with a government subordinate to the viceroy of the Captaincy of Rio de Janeiro, with its governors being called "governors". Designated by royal charter, which often also specified their powers and limitations, the governor was sworn in at the capital's city council, and could be dismissed by the viceroy at any time. His attributions did not differ much from those of military commanders, and the Viceroy had the discretion to establish specific functions for him. For example, the regiment of Governor José Custódio de Sá e Faria, in 1764, established that it was up to him to impose punishment on the "vagabonds" and, if necessary, send them to Rio de Janeiro, and also to guarantee that the Indians would not disturb the population.

In 1796, a "Notice from His Majesty" determined the establishment of an independent captaincy, which only materialized in 1807 with the creation of the Captaincy of São Pedro do Rio Grande do Sul, which had dominion over the government of the Captaincy of Santa Catarina. Simultaneously with the elevations of the territory to sub-captaincy (1760) and general-captaincy (1807), the governors' powers were also increased, gaining more autonomy from the central government in Rio de Janeiro. The governor spent most of his time on military matters, but his authority encompassed tax, judicial and administrative jurisdiction, presiding over the joints of the Royal Treasury and Criminal Justice Board, although his interference in non-military areas was routinely questioned.

=== Imperial Period ===
In 1822, with the Independence of Brazil, the captaincy became a province, where a civilian government was constituted under the leadership of the provincial president, who still maintained considerable power among the military, now commanded by the military secretary. As for his form of appointment, the Brazilian Constitution of 1824 established:

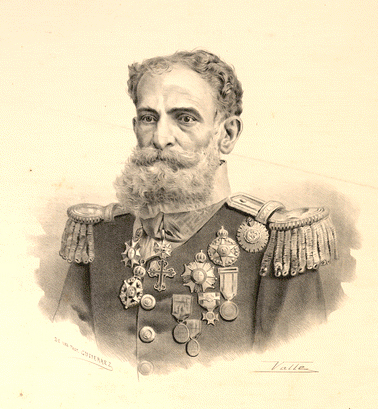
Deodoro da Fonseca, the first president of Brazil, presided over the Province of São Pedro do Rio Grande do Sul in 1886

Art. 165. There will be a president in each province, nominated by the Emperor, who can remove him when he feels it is convenient for the good service of the State.

As a result, from 1822 to 1889 there was a high turnover of provincial presidents throughout the country; the presidents had as their immediate successors the first and second vice-presidents. It was normal for the Portuguese government to choose politicians from other regions to preside over the province, a practice that guaranteed loyalty to imperial power. However, between the departure of one and the inauguration of the new president, it was common for the vice-president, chosen among politicians from Rio Grande do Sul, to assume the post. According to Pereira, the presidents were the "delegates of the head of the nation" and those who "governed the province of Sul-rio-grandense conquered to a great extent local political and parliamentary importance, allowing them to circulate through various positions, whether elective or not.

During the Ragamuffin War, the biggest civil war in Brazilian history, the province had two parallel governments, one loyal to the emperor and the other to the rebels, in the figure of the president of the Riograndense Republic. When the conflict erupted in 1835, President Antônio Rodrigues Fernandes Braga was deposed by the farrapos. The 1843 Constitution of the Rio-Grandense Republic specified the powers of the president in its Title V, Chapter I. Elected by the General Assembly for a four-year term, he could not be reelected consecutively. He was responsible for the administration, nominating magistrates, ministers, senators, ambassadors, military commanders, and deciding on laws approved by the legislature. Only Bento Gonçalves da Silva and Gomes Jardim were presidents of the Rio-Grandense Republic. In 1845, Duke of Caxias, the provincial president appointed by the emperor, managed to pacify the province and the war came to an end with the signing of the Treaty of Poncho Verde.

The province formed a legislative power, whose approved projects were submitted to the president. The 1834 Additional Act sought to regulate the relations between the legislative and the executive; the president could return (veto) to the legislature projects that he considered "inconvenient" and "unconstitutional". If it was classified as unconstitutional, it was submitted to the imperial government and to the General Assembly for deliberation; if inconvenient, the veto could be overturned by a vote of two thirds of the legislators. In addition, it was possible for the president to postpone legislative sessions, sometimes leading to the postponement of the budget deliberation. The deputies were elected by the people, and the provincial presidents acted as electoral agents for members of their cabinets. The president and the legislators did not always coexist harmoniously; in 1889, the deputies approved a motion asking the imperial government to dismiss President Galdino Pimentel, which occurred a few days later. These conflicts were more frequent when the president of the province belonged to a different party from the majority of the deputies.

=== Republican Period ===
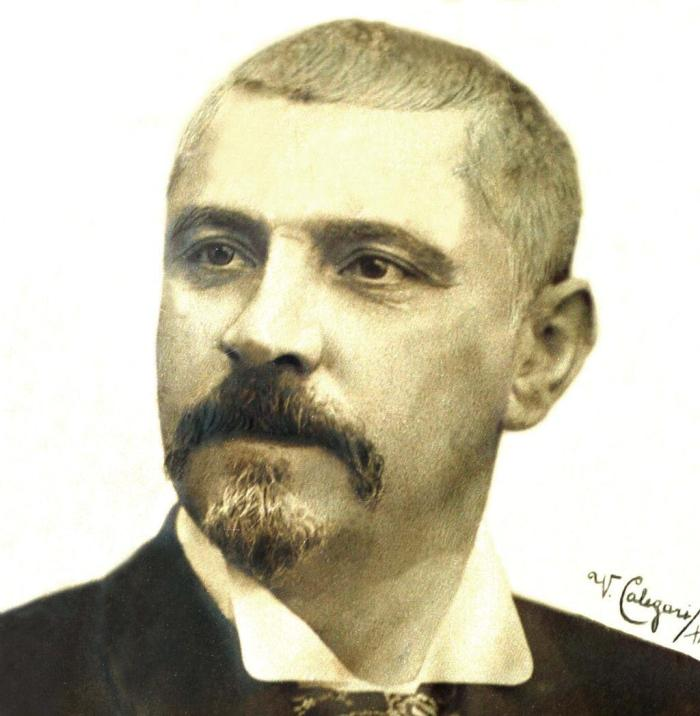
Júlio de Castilhos wrote the State Constitution of 1893, which established a strong executive

With the proclamation of the Republic, Rio Grande do Sul concluded its Constitution in 1893. Authored by Júlio de Castilhos, it established a legislature with limited powers and a strong executive, which could legislate by decree in non-financial matters and intervene directly in municipalities. The text dictated that the "supreme governmental and administrative direction of the State belongs to the President, who will exercise it freely, according to the public good, interpreted in accordance with the laws. Elected by direct election, his mandate was for five years, with the possibility of reelection if he obtained 75% of the votes. If no candidate reached the absolute majority of the votes, the deputies were responsible for choosing the president from among the two most voted in the election. His successors were the vice-president and the secretaries, respectively. The eligibility criteria included the need to be a native of Rio Grande do Sul, to reside in the state, to be over thirty years old, and not to be "related by blood or marriage in the first two degrees" to the president or the incumbent substitute. The president and the interims received a salary, fixed by the legislature.

In 1898, Borges de Medeiros assumed the presidency of the state, but political control continued to be exercised by Castilhos until his death in 1903. Medeiros eventually managed to assert his authority by resorting to electoral fraud to secure his successive reelections. In 1908, unable to run for reelection again, Borges sponsored the candidacy of his supporter Carlos Barbosa, who was easily elected, also through fraud. Borges returned to power in 1913 and, when he ran for a fifth time in 1923, results considered fraudulent by his opponents triggered the 1923 Revolution. The Pact of Pedras Altas, signed at the end of that year, prohibited the reelection of the president, forced the holding of an election to choose the vice-president and reserved a number of seats in the Assembly for the opponents. In 1928, Getúlio Vargas succeeded Borges after being elected without having to run with any opposition candidates.

Upon assuming the presidency of the Republic through the Revolution of 1930, Getúlio Vargas appointed federal interventors to replace the state presidents. In 1935, a Constituent Assembly was organized to draft a new state constitution. The 1935 Constitution gave greater importance to the legislative branch and determined that the Executive Power would be exercised by the governor, elected by universal suffrage every four years, who could not be reelected consecutively. If no candidate received a majority of votes, the deputies would elect the governor by an absolute majority of votes. The new constitutional charter increased to 35 the minimum age to hold office. Intervenor Flores da Cunha was the first governor to take office under these conditions. Initially an ally of Vargas, Cunha gradually distanced himself from the president, who acted so that the Legislative Assembly would approve his impeachment. Cunha got rid of the impeachment - by one vote - and tried to prevent the Estado Novo coup, but Vargas fought back and compromised the governor's power to react, even demilitarizing and federalizing the Military Brigade; Cunha ended up resigning.

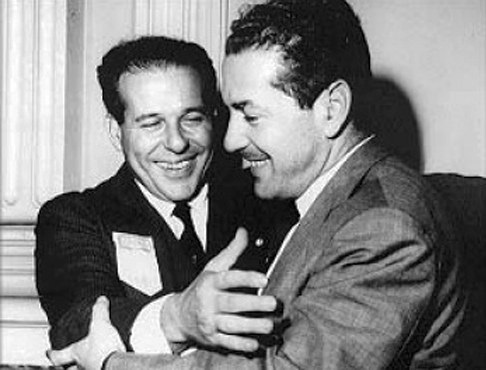
In 1961, Leonel Brizola (right) used his powers as governor to secure the inauguration of João Goulart (left) as president of the Republic

The Estado Novo enabled Vargas to continue choosing the governor of Rio Grande do Sul. Initially, the president appointed interventors who had no direct ties to the state, ensuring that they would be loyal to him while at the same time undermining the autonomy of his home state. Vargas fell in 1945 and the new president Eurico Gaspar Dutra appointed Cylon Rosa as acting governor until the elections of 1947; Walter Jobim was elected governor. After remaining closed for years, the Legislative Branch, through the Constituent Assembly of 1947, aimed to increase its powers with the implementation of a parliamentary regime in the state. The idea was approved by 30 votes to 24 under protest from the governors, who denounced the proposed model as unconstitutional. Jobim appealed to the Supreme Court and, after the promulgation of the new Constitution, the Supreme Court unanimously ruled the parliamentary provisions unconstitutional, forcing the deputies to amend the newly approved text so that the governor's "presidentialist character" functions would be restored.

From 1950 to 1962, the state held four elections for governor marked by polarization between the PTB and PSD. In 1961 Governor Leonel Brizola created the Legality Campaign (Portuguese: Campanha da Legalidade) to ensure the inauguration of João Goulart as President of the Republic. Brizola turned the Brigade over to the regional army command and even distributed firearms to civilians, turning the seat of government into a trench. The military ministers ordered the bombing of Piratini Palace, but officers from the Canoas Air Base rebelled and did not carry out the order. In 1964, to avoid a similar movement, Governor Ildo Meneghetti transferred the seat of government to Passo Fundo for three days, from where he supported the successful military coup. With Institutional Act Number Three, the military dictatorship established that the state deputies would elect the governor and vice governor; in Rio Grande do Sul, the majority of the deputies were pro-regime, resulting in successive elections of arenist governors.

The governor was directly elected again in the 1982 election. PDS and PMDB dominated, but unionism was back with PDT and PT. With the opposition divided, Jair Soares, supporter of the military regime, was elected governor. Since then, the voters of Rio Grande do Sul have elected their governors directly, with a two-round system. In the following decades, Alceu Collares was elected the first black governor of the state in 1990, Yeda Crusius became in 2006 the first woman to head the executive of Rio Grande do Sul, and Eduardo Leite, elected in 2018, was the first openly gay Brazilian governor. (Note: According to El País, Governor Fátima Bezerra was the first state chief executive in Brazil to declare herself LGBT. However, as reported by Deutsche Welle, "[Fatima Bezerra] is referred to as a lesbian by allies, [but] there is no record of her publicly coming out as such." Leite's title as "the first governor in Brazilian history to come out as gay" was conferred by the BBC.)

In 1997, reelection for the executive was allowed, and all the governors from Rio Grande do Sul tried to get reelected, but none succeeded. In 1998, Antônio Britto was the closest, getting 49.2% of the votes. In 2002, Olívio Dutra was defeated by Tarso Genro in the petitions primaries. Germano Rigotto (2006) and Yeda (2010) came in third place. Tarso (2014) and José Ivo Sartori (2018) lost in the second round. Therefore, Rio Grande do Sul is the only Brazilian state that has not reelected any governor. More than that, turnover in the government of Rio Grande do Sul has occurred every time the state has held free elections, from 1945 to 1964 and since 1982. According to political scientist Fernando Schüler, the state's financial situation, which includes chronic fiscal deficit and low investment capacity, was a factor that "weakens the governments before society.

== Bibliography ==
- Axt, Gunter (1999), A Constituinte de 1989: história da Constituição dos gaúchos, Porto Alegre: Assembleia Legislativa do Rio Grande do Sul
- Careli, Sandra da Silva; Knierim, Luiz Claudio (2012), Releituras da história do Rio Grande do Sul, Porto Alegre: Careli, ISBN 9788577701490
- Schmidt, Paulo (2004), Os 170 Anos do Parlamento Gaúcho, Porto Alegre: Companhia Rio-grandense de Artes Gráficas
- Goularte, Rodrigo da Silva (2007), Assembléias Provinciais e a Cidadania no Brasil: o Caso do Espírito Santo, Porto Alegre: Associação Nacional de História
- Heinz, Flávio M.; Vargas, Jonas Moreira; Flach, Angela; Milke, Daniel Roberto (2005), O Parlamento em Tempos Interessantes, Porto Alegre: Assembleia Legislativa do Rio Grande do Sul
- Axt, Gunter (1848), Hauptsacht. 1.1839 - 2.Ser. 6, Volume 11, Instituto Brasileiro de Geografía e Estatística
- Iotti, Luiza Horn (1999), Presidentes da província: a leitura oficial dos imigrantes italianos no império, Caxias do Sul: Universidade de Caxias do Sul
- Miranda, Maria Eckert (2000), Continente de São Pedro: administração pública no período colonial, Porto Alegre: Assembleia Legislativa do Rio Grande do Sul, Ministério Público do Rio Grande do Sul e Companhia Rio-Grandense de Artes Gráficas
- Noll, Maria Izabel; Trindade, Hélgio (2002), Subsídios para a história do parlamento gaúcho: 170 anos 1890-1937, Porto Alegre: Assembleia Legislativa do Rio Grande do Sul
- Oliveira, Marcelo França de (2007), O projeto constitucional rio-grandense versus a constituição brasileira de 1824: aproximações e distanciamentos de duas cartas magnas liberais, X Encontro Estadual de História
- Pereira, Christiane (2017), Os primeiros presidentes em duas províncias distintas: Goiás e Rio Grande do Sul - 1824 - 1831, XXIX Simpósio Nacional de História
- Pesavento, Sandra Jatahy (1996), História da Assembléia Legislativa do Rio Grande do Sul: a trajetória do parlamento gaúcho. Porto Alegre: Assembléia Legislativa do Estado do Rio Grande do Sul, Porto Alegre: Assembleia Legislativa do Rio Grande do Sul
- Rodrigues Júnior, Gonçalo; Mirco, Carmen Helena Braz (2000), Toponímia indígena do município de Rio Grande
- Schmidt, Paulo (2017), Continente de São Pedro: administração pública no período colonial, São Paulo: Leya Brasil, ISBN 9788544106341
- Zatti, Carlos (2017), A história do Sul, Clube de Autores, ISBN 9788567319056
