= Lasier Martins =

Brazilian politician and journalist (born 1942)

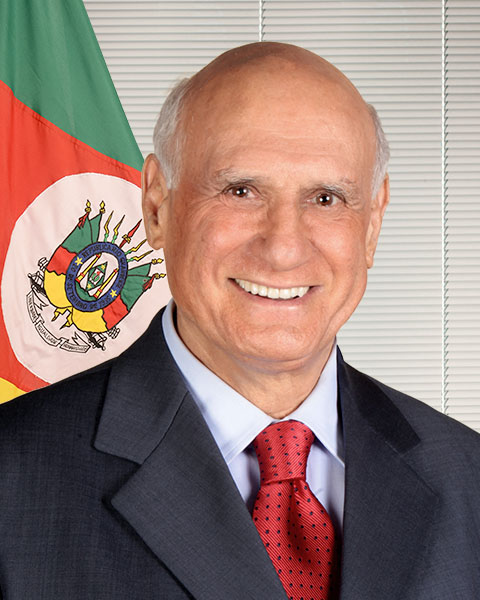

Senator for Rio Grande do Sul
- In office 1 February 2015 – 1 February 2023
- Preceded by: Pedro Simon
- Succeeded by: Hamilton Mourão

Second Vice President of the Federal Senate
- In office 6 February 2019 – 1 February 2021
- President: Davi Alcolumbre
- Preceded by: João Alberto de Souza
- Succeeded by: Romário Faria

Personal details
- Born: 14 April 1942 (age 84) General Câmara, Rio Grande do Sul, Brazil
- Party: PODE (2019–present)
- Other political affiliations: PDT (2013–2016); PSD (2016–2019)
- Occupation: Politician
- Profession: Journalist

Lasier Costa Martins (born 14 April 1942) is a Brazilian politician, journalist, and television presenter. A member of the Progressive Party (PP), he represented the state of Rio Grande do Sul in the Federal Senate from 2015 to 2023. Before entering politics, Martins had a long career in broadcast journalism, becoming widely known in southern Brazil for his work as a television commentator and presenter, particularly on legal, consumer-rights, and public-interest issues.

== Journalism career ==
Lasier Costa Martins built a long career in broadcast journalism in the state of Rio Grande do Sul, becoming widely known through decades of work in radio and television. He gained prominence as a television commentator focusing on consumer protection, public safety, and accountability in public administration, particularly through editorial commentary and on-air denunciations of abuses.

In 2006, a video circulated online showing Martins receiving an electric shock while examining grapes at the Grape Festival in Caxias do Sul in 1996, an incident that later drew national attention after being widely shared on YouTube.

== Political career ==
After decades in journalism, Martins entered electoral politics and was elected to the Federal Senate in 2014, representing the state of Rio Grande do Sul. He took office in February 2015 and served one term, leaving the Senate at the end of his mandate in 2023.

During his tenure, Martins advocated stricter criminal legislation, judicial reform, and changes to Brazil's political system, positions that aligned him with law-and-order and institutional-reform agendas. Over the course of his political career, he was affiliated with more than one political party, reflecting shifts within Brazil's center-right political field.

== Public image ==
Martins’ public image has often been associated with a confrontational rhetorical style, which carried over from his work in journalism into his political activities. Brazilian media have frequently described him as a polarizing figure, drawing both support and criticism for his outspoken positions on crime, justice, and institutional reform.

Federal Senate
Preceded by João Alberto de Souza	Second Vice President of the Federal Senate; 2019–2021	Succeeded by Romário Faria
