= Antônio Britto =

Brazilian journalist and executive

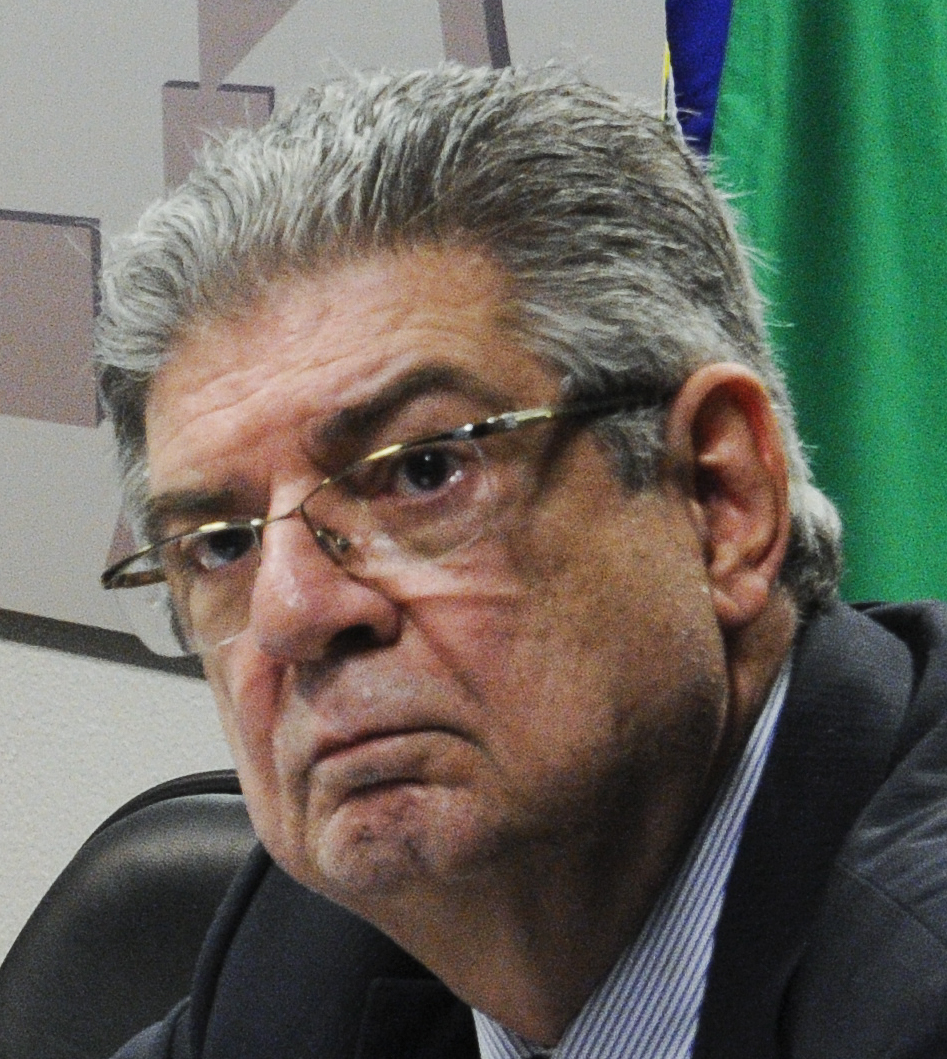

12th [[Minister of Social Security]]
- In office 15 October 1992 – 15 December 1993
- President: Itamar Franco
- Preceded by: Reinhold Stephanes
- Succeeded by: Sérgio Cutolo dos Santos

Governor of Rio Grande do Sul
- In office 1 January 1995 – 1 January 1999
- Preceded by: Alceu de Deus Collares
- Succeeded by: Olívio Dutra

Personal details
- Born: Antônio Britto Filho; 1 July 1952 (age 73) Santana do Livramento, Rio Grande do Sul, Brazil
- Profession: Journalist and entrepreneur

Antonio Britto Filho GOMM (born July 1, 1952 in Sant'Ana do Livramento) is a Brazilian journalist, librarian, and politician, who served as State Congressman, Minister of Social Security, and Governor of the state of Rio Grande do Sul from 1995 to 1999.

== Academic and journalistic life ==
The son of a journalist, he began working in a small local newspaper for his father before completing his studies in journalism at the Federal University of Rio Grande do Sul. Professionally, he started working in 1970 at the Journal of the Week, Sunday Publishing Group Editorial Sinos, as editor of soccer. Later, at the suggestion of journalist Paulo Sant'Ana, he worked as a reporter for the paper Zero Hora, group RBS, at 19 years of age.

In 1972, he moved to radio Guaíba (belonging to the Caldas Júnior), at the invitation of Pedro Carneiro Pereira, where he became coordinator of the area and was head of sports journalism. In 1978, he left Guaíba and returned to the RBS group and started working at TV Gaucha. That same year, he became a professor at the University of Vale do Rio dos Sinos (Unisinos), a position he held until 1979.

RBS was passed in 1979 to further the editorial policy of Rede Globo in Brasília, acting as a commentator and presenter. In early 1985, right after the election of Tancredo Neves for the presidency, he was asked to become press secretary for the new government. In this role, he served as spokesman of medical information on the health of the President, in the period just prior to his death on 21 April 1985.

== Early political career ==
Known through the television media and author of a book on the last days of Tancredo, he was invited by Ulysses Guimarães to join the Brazilian Democratic Movement (PMDB). To this party, he threw himself as a candidate in the federal deputy elections of 1986, being elected with one of the largest votes in the state (and reelected in 1990).

In the Chamber of Deputies of Brazil, he served in the preparation of the 1988 Constitution and was Chairman of the Committee on Science and Technology, Communication and Computing in the 1990-91 biennium. In 1988, he was appointed as the PMDB candidate for mayor of Porto Alegre, but despite the initial favoritism, he faded and finished fourth in the election, which was won by Olivio Dutra (Workers Party, PT).

In 1992, he was invited by President Itamar Franco to take the position of the Social Welfare. In the presidential decision to upgrade the salaries of retirees, he was very beneficial, which leveraged the national popularity and put him as one of the probable successors of Itamar's own elections in 1994. However, before the government preferred to seek its own state, guiding the support of the PMDB's presidential candidacy to the local Fernando Henrique Cardoso (Social Democratic Party, PSDB), in contrast to the official party candidate, Orestes Quercia.

In the first round of elections, he won 49.2% of the valid votes, against 34.7% of his main competitor, Dutra. In the second round, getting support from the Progressive Party (PPR) and part of the Democratic Labour Party (PDT) (then governor of Alceu Collares), he obtained 52.2% of the votes against 47.8% for Olivio. The polarization PMDB/PT in Rio Grande do Sul was repeated in the elections of 1998 and 2002.

In 2016, Antonio Britto didn't take part in the voting concerning the impeachment of then-president Dilma Rousseff.

== Britto Government ==
The management ahead of the government of Rio Grande do Sul was marked by administrative reforms and a heated controversy with the opposition (led by the PT), which held the hegemony of the unions of servers, especially the CPERS, which combines the teaching state.

This controversy was not limited to the salary issue, but included measures that Antonio Britto and his government have adopted to pursue the reorganization of state finances, which included the privatisation of the large municipalities of the state of public services, the Riograndense Telecommunications Company (telephony) and the State Company for Electric Energy, both established in the management of Brizola (1959–1962).

For the supporters of government Britto, privatization would increase the scope of services, reducing the cost of installation. To his opponents, the fees charged by the privatised companies would become more expensive over time for the population, benefiting only a few specific business groups.

Another focus of controversy was the policy of attracting major car companies to the state through tax relief, such as exemption from ICMS tax in the early years. To his opponents, the policy of attracting investments (involving the state in the "war tax" to other states) represented a loss to the treasury, not compensating for the generation of jobs.

Another measure of the government, which Britto fought, was the creation of private road poles, which were granted to tolls, a measure that undermined its popularity in some localities. In banking, the government Britto held a merger of two state banks, incorporating Caixa Econômica Estadual do Rio Grande do Sul by Banrisul. Some measures of privatizing Antonio Britto (which earned him the charge of "liberal" by its opponents), prior to privatization own federal government, the management of Fernando Henrique Cardoso.

== 1998 elections ==
Politically, he sought to govern with a huge party base, isolating only the PT. This allowed the composition of a broad coalition of parties to the 1998 elections, when he ran for reelection by the PMDB. But in some cases, favouring the PPB (who appointed his running mate, José Otávio Germano) led to splits within his own party, which in some municipalities announced support for the PT.

He even won the first round of elections by a small margin. In the second round he lost to his 1994 opponent, Olivio Dutra (PT) by a margin of 87,366 votes. In the election, there was decisive support for the PDT (the opposite of privatization) for the PT candidate.

== Business practices ==
After the defeat in his bid for reelection, he worked in private practice as a consultant to Telefonica of Spain, which led to suspicions of favouritism in the privatization of CRT in 1997. In 2001, still tipped as favourite for the succession of Olivio Dutra (who would not be running for reelection), Antonio Britto clashed with Sen. Pedro Simon, the main regional leader of the PMDB, and ended up leaving the party.

Then he joined the Socialist People's Party (PSP) (incipient state), along with its support base, and launched into a succession of state in 2002, in alliance with the Liberal Front Party (PFL) (PDT since refused to support it within the rule of "piggybacking" of coalitions in the states). However, the strong rejection of his name made their voting intentions "migrate" en masse for the candidate of the PMDB, Germano Rigotto. He came in third, with only 12% of the vote, while Rigotto defeated Tarso Genro (PT) in the second round, again bringing the PMDB to the state government.

Since then, Britto announced his abandonment of politics, becoming director of the company Azaléia, and its president, after the death of its founder, Nestor de Paula, who approached the government for state support. In 2005, he became involved in a national controversy when closing a factory unit in Rio Grande do Sul, laying off 800 employees, while opening a plant in China. Worn with the heirs of Nestor de Paula, on behalf of a conflicting relationship, in late 2006, he announced his withdrawal from Azaléia, by resignation.

At Sure for Claro, he has been working in the area of corporate affairs, with the objective of organizing the company's relations with the external public and with Congress.
