= Teresópolis, Rio Grande do Sul =

Neighbourhood in Porto Alegre, Brazil

Teresópolis is a neighbourhood (bairro) in the city of Porto Alegre, the state capital of Rio Grande do Sul, in Brazil. It was created by Law 2022 from December 7, 1959, but had its limits modified by Law 2681 from December 21, 1963.

In 1876, Guilherme Ferreira de Abreu divided his property in the area of Teresópolis into lots and Italian immigrants settled here. The region was then named after the Baron of Teresópolis, who was Guilherme's brother. In 1910, its inhabitants organized a Festa da Uva celebration.
