= Festa da Uva (Ponta Grossa) =

Agricultural fair in Southern Brazil

Grape Festival Festa da Uva, Mel, Queijos, Fiambre e do Artesanato (Fesuva)
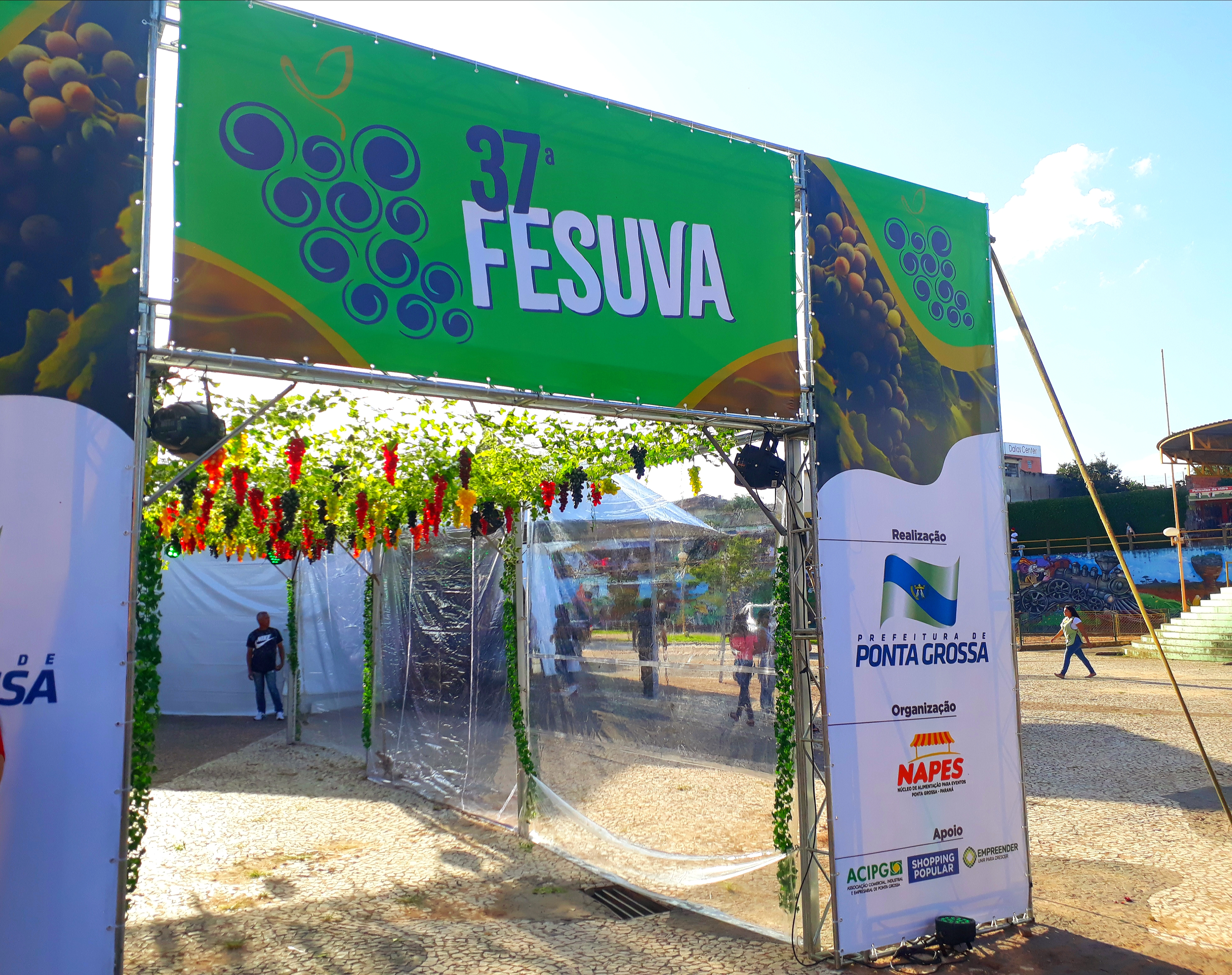
- Festa da Uva in Ponta Grossa.
- Genre: Fair
- Begins: January
- Ends: January
- Locations: Ponta Grossa, Paraná, Brazil
- Inaugurated: 1982
- Organizer: Ponta Grossa City Hall

The Grape, Honey, Cheese, Ham and Handicraft Festival (Portuguese: Festa da Uva, Mel, Queijos, Fiambre e do Artesanato, Fesuva) is a fair of agro-regional production in the Brazilian city of Ponta Grossa, in the state of Paraná.

== History ==
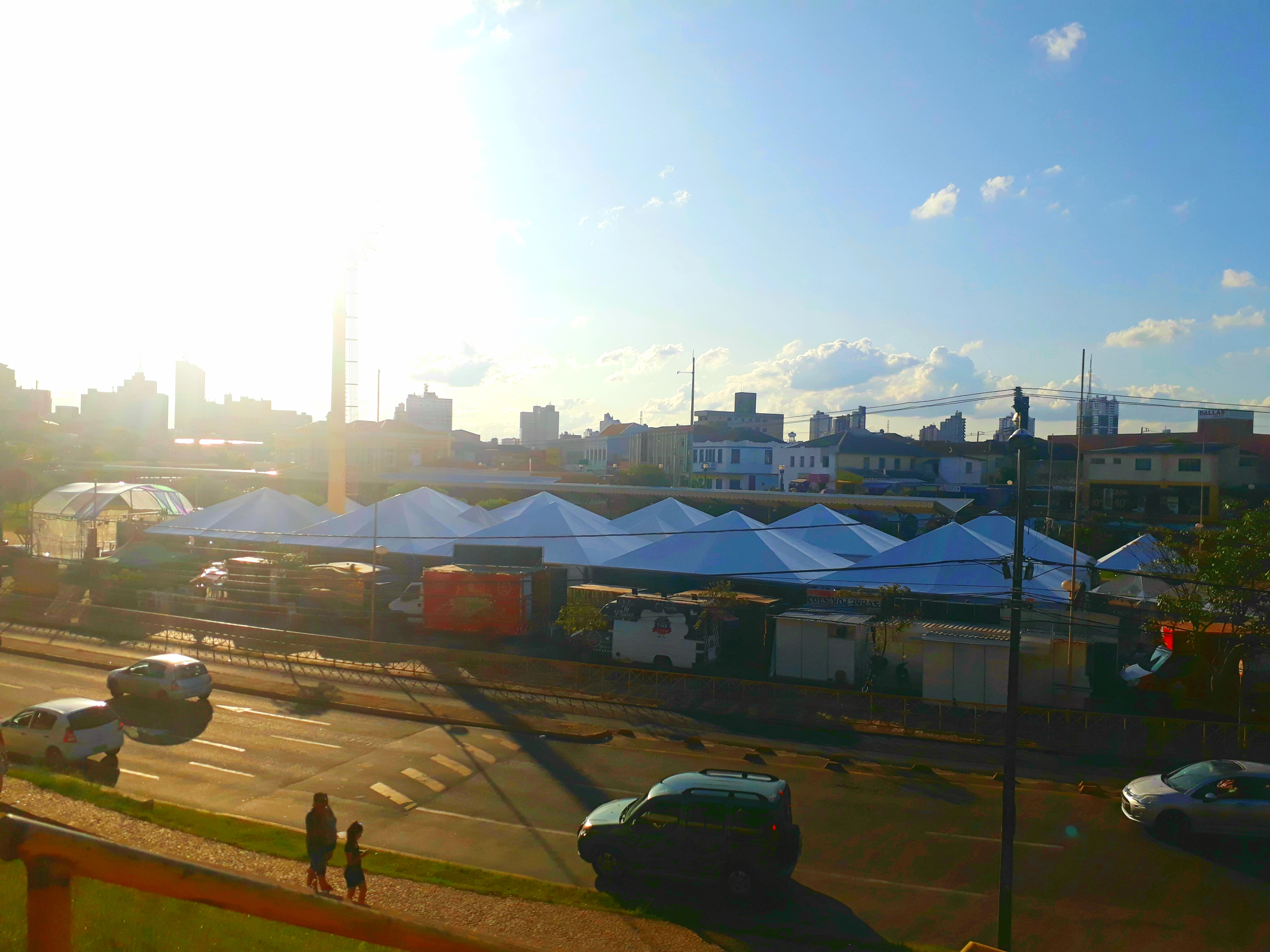
37th Festa da Uva at the Governador Manoel Ribas Environmental Complex, in Ponta Grossa.

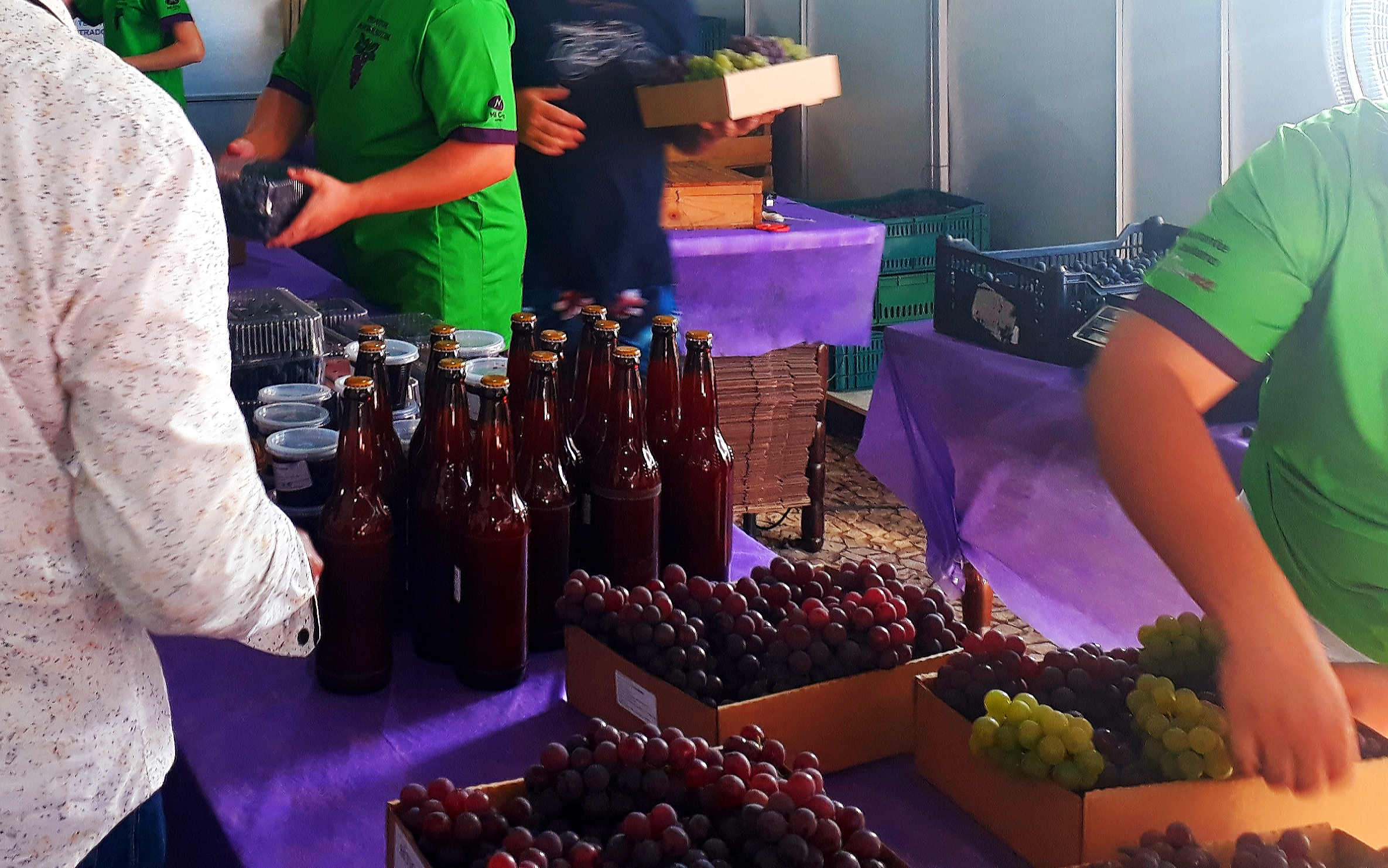
Typical products being commercialized at the fair.

The first Festa da Uva dos Campos Gerais, as it was called, took place in 1982, on the 30th and 31st of January, at Benjamin Constant Street in Ponta Grossa. At the time, the fruit was sold at Cr$1.50 a kilo, in standard three-kilo packages. The purpose of the festival was to encourage local wine producers and pay tribute to the region's Italian immigrants.

From the fifth edition, in 1986, the fair left Benjamin Constant and began to be held at the Praça Barão do Rio Branco, where it remained until 1993 when it was moved to the Events Center for the public's comfort. The fair took place on the 6th and 7th of February. The festival had several attractions, and for the first time commercialized handcraft pieces.

Since 1997, Fesuva has been held annually in the Governador Manoel Ribas Environmental Complex, next to the Saudade Station. In 2008, between the 24th and 27th of January, the 25th edition was held. With the growth of the event in the 2000s, the fair started to commercialize an average of 25 tons of grapes, besides grape juice and wine, cakes, jams, cheese, charcuterie, and honey. The average public has reached up to 50,000 per year.

In 2019, 37 tons of grapes were sold during the festival, while in 2020 the event had the prospect of selling 40 tons of grapes, composed of black, white, and pink grapes. The infrastructure was expanded, with a food court and food stalls, food trucks, and breweries, in addition to the already traditional products of the homemade agro-industry based on the fruit, such as cookies, jellies, and sweets, cheese and sausage products, such as salami. In recent years the fair also began to receive a musical program, dances, and cultural presentations.

== Gallery ==
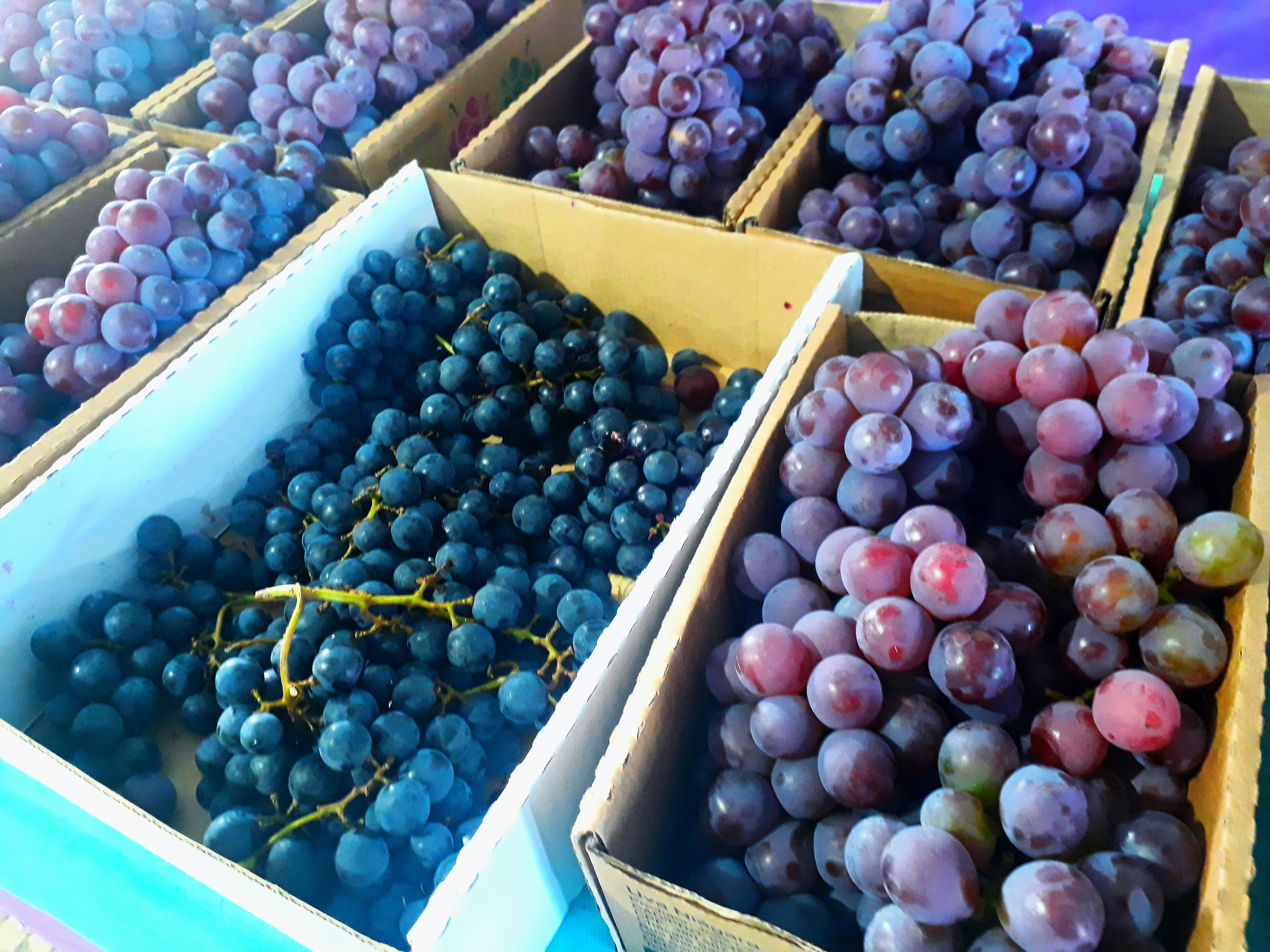
Examples of grape varieties on display at the Festa da Uva

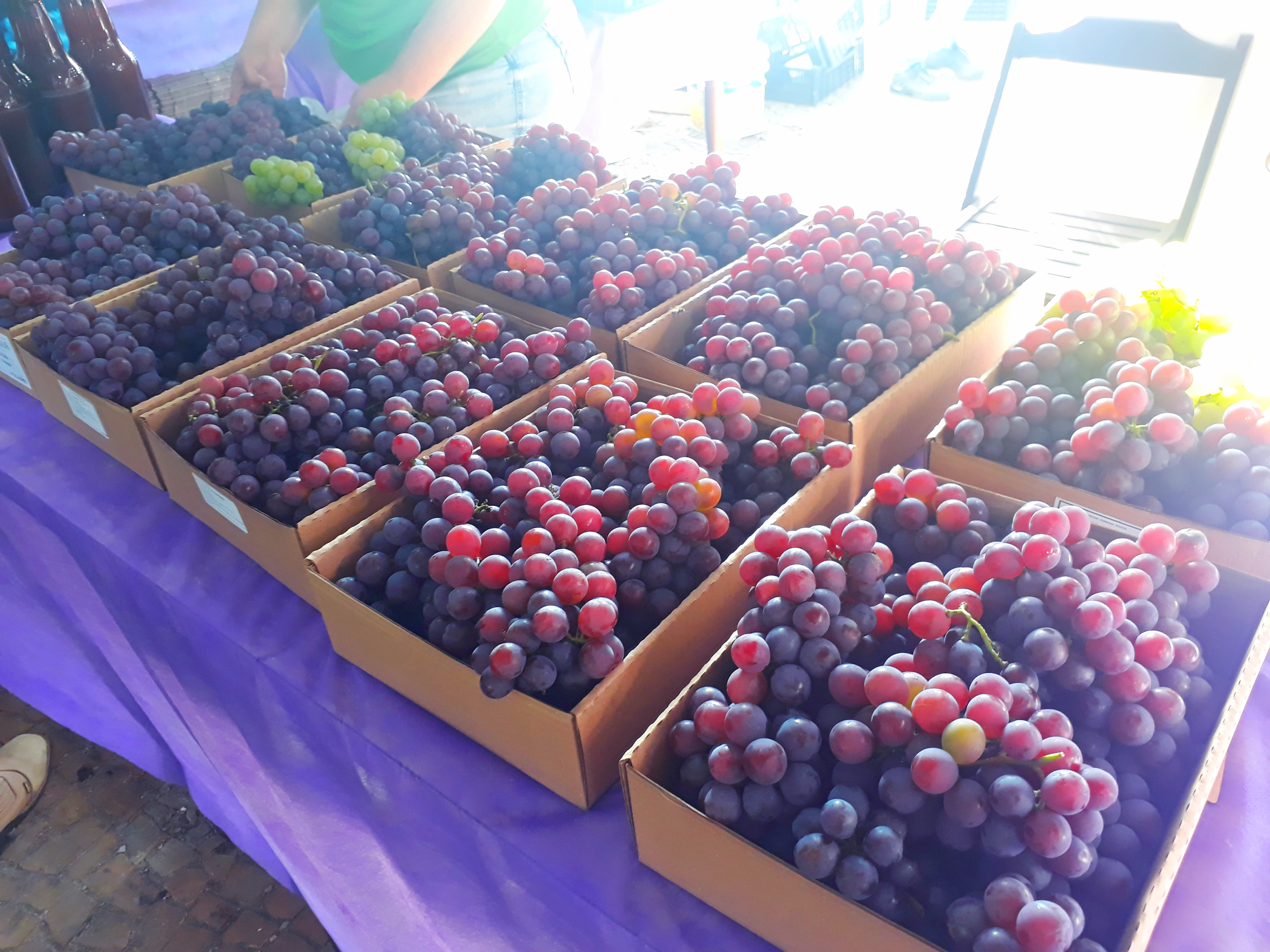
Boxes of grapes at the Festa da Uva.

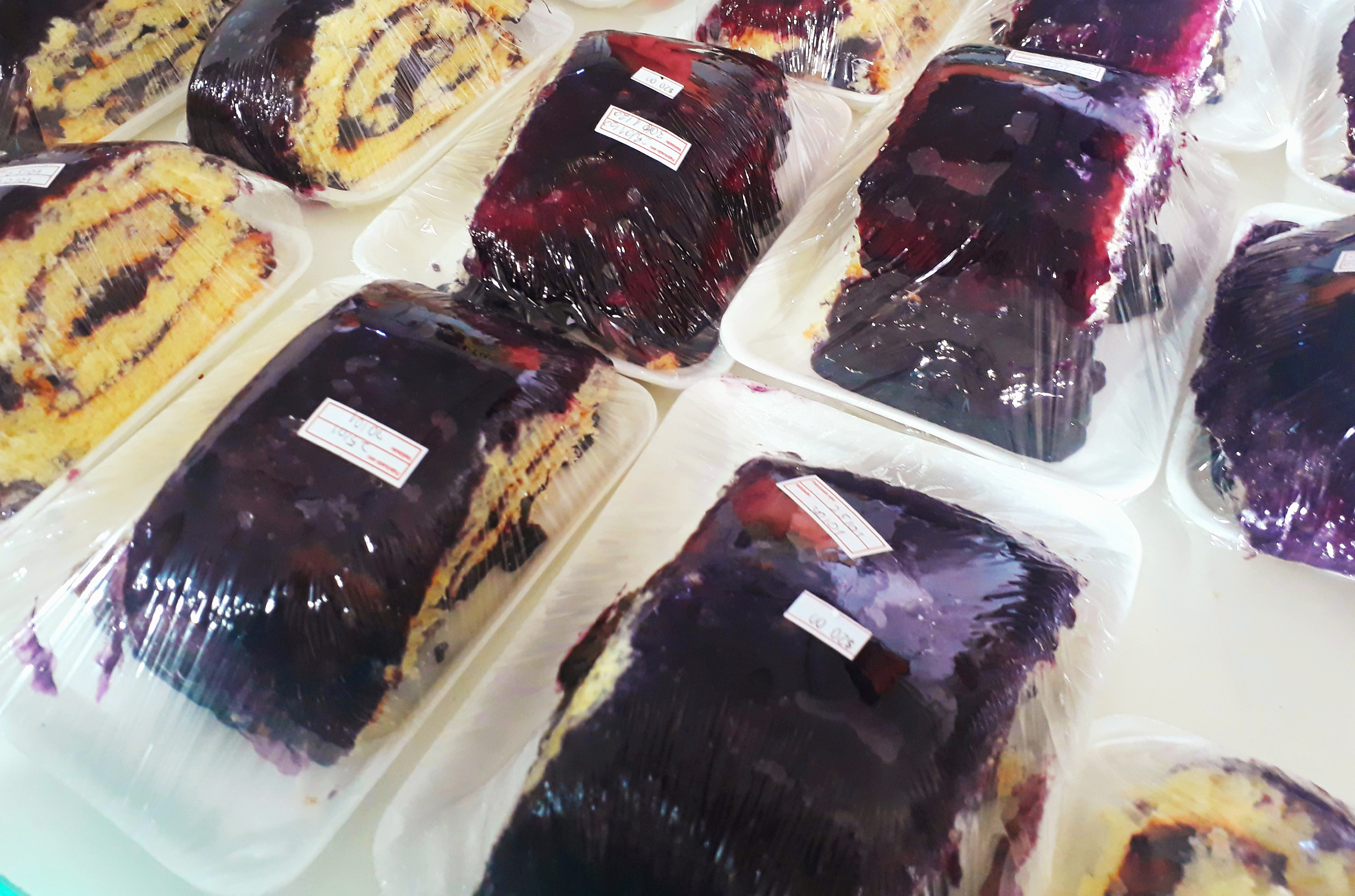
Grape Rocambole being sold during the event.

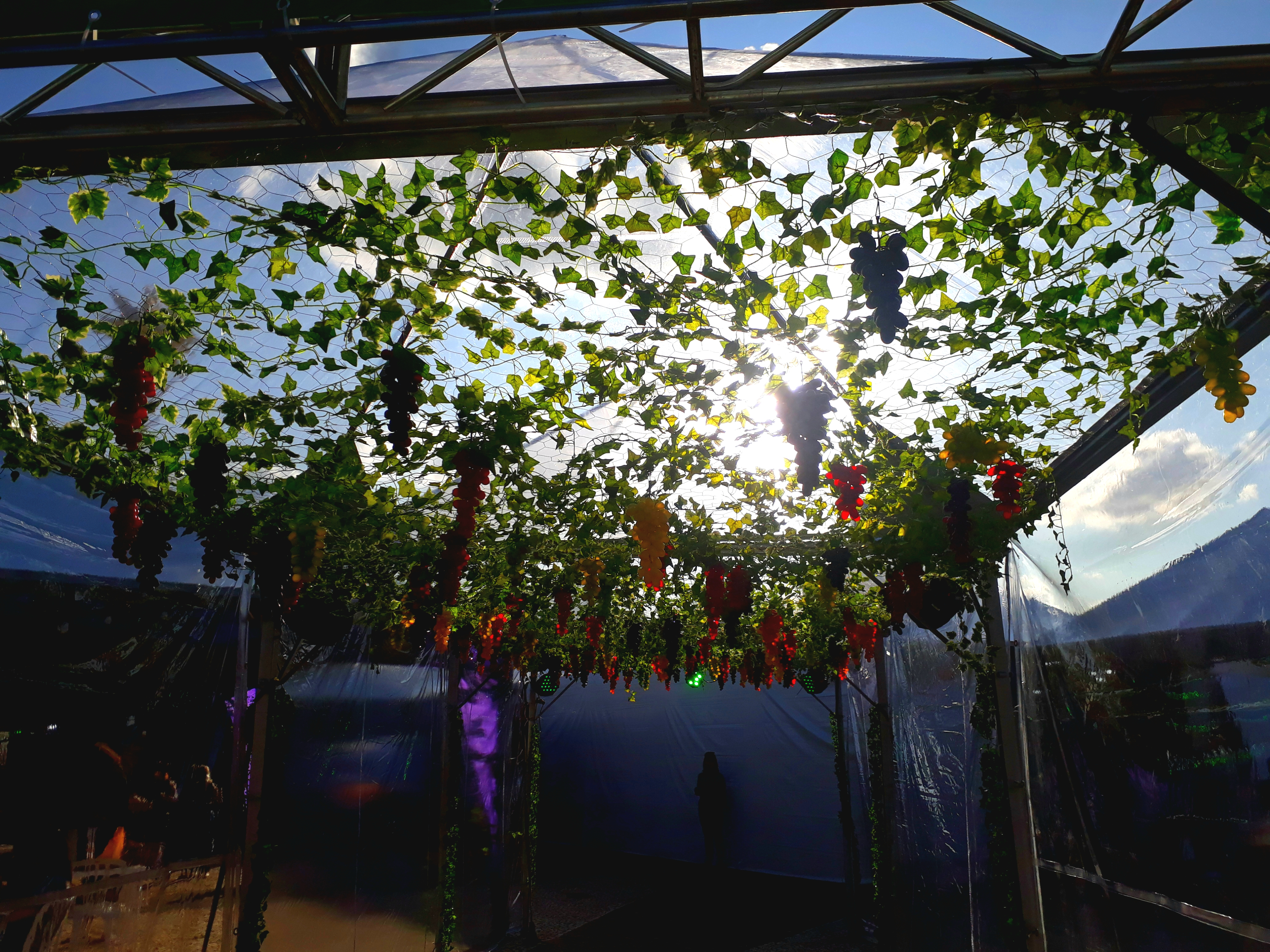
Festa da Uva decoration.

== See also ==
- Festa da Uva
