= Spanish–Portuguese War (1735–1737) =

1735–1737 South-American colonial war

- The Banda Oriental
Date	14 October 1735 – August 1737
Location	Banda Oriental, South America
Result	Portuguese victory
Territorial changes	Status quo ante bellum

Belligerents
Portugal	Spain

Commanders and leaders
(Portugal) Silva Pais (Portugal) António Pedro de Vasconcelos	(Spain) Miguel de Salcedo y Sierraalta

Strength
About 2,000 Portuguese	About 2,000 Spanish; 4,000 Guaranís

The Spanish-Portuguese War between 1735 and 1737 was fought over the Banda Oriental, roughly present-day Uruguay.

At the time, this part of South-America was sparsely populated and was on the border between Portuguese Brazil and the Spanish Governorate of the Río de la Plata. Spain claimed the area based on the Treaty of Tordesillas of 1494, but Portugal had founded the first city there, Sacramento Colony, in 1680. Spain had taken the city twice, in 1681 and in 1705, but was required to give it back to the Portuguese by the Treaty of Utrecht in 1713.

The following years saw an expansion of the Portuguese settlements around the Sacramento Colony to a radius of up to 120 km. As a reaction, Captain-General of Río de la Plata Bruno Mauricio de Zabala had founded Montevideo on December 24, 1726 to prevent further expansion. However, the Portuguese trade made the Spanish suffer, as they were still compelled to trade with Spain over the Viceroyalty of Peru, who imposed heavy taxes. Spain considered the Portuguese presence to be illegitimate and their trade contraband.

In March 1734, the new Captain-General of Río de la Plata, Miguel de Salcedo y Sierraalta, received orders from Madrid to reduce the action radius of the Sacramento Colony to "a gunshot," around 2 km. He sent an ultimatum to António Pedro de Vasconcelos, the Portuguese governor of the colony, who stalled for time.

In 1735, tensions raised between Spain and Portugal and Spanish ships under Alzaybar captured several Portuguese vessels. On April 19, Spanish First Secretary of State José Patiño ordered Salcedo to attack Sacramento.

Salcedo gathered 1500 men and marched slowly on Sacramento but wasted much time attacking minor targets along the road. He was supported by 4,000 Guaraní warriors who came from the Jesuit Reductions. The siege started on October 14, 1735.

By then, Vasconcelos had prepared the defense with a garrison of about 900 men and sent a messenger to Rio de Janeiro to ask for reinforcements. José da Silva Pais sent six Portuguese ships, which arrived on January 6 followed by 12 more ships a few days later. The Spanish had tried to impose a naval blockade, but the Portuguese had more ships and gained naval superiority.

In 1736 and 1737, more ships were sent from Spain and Portugal, and occasional confrontations between a few ships occurred, but Spain could not gain the upper hand. On September 6, 1736, the Portuguese even lay siege to Montevideo but withdrew when Salcedo sent a relief force of 200 men.

On March 16, 1737, under the influence of France, Great Britain and the Dutch Republic, a treaty was signed. In September, the siege was lifted and the Spanish withdrew their forces and Miguel de Salcedo was disposed as governor of Buenos Aires.

The war was local and involved only a couple of thousand men on each side.

== Ships involved ==
=== Portugal ===
Ship	Guns	Commander	Notes
Nossa Senhora da Vitória	74	Luís de Abreu Prego	Flagship
Nossa Senhora da Conceição	74	João Pereira dos Santos	
Nossa Senhora da Esperança	70		
Nossa Senhora da Arrábida	64		
Nossa Senhora das Ondas	58		
Nossa Senhora da Lampadosa	50		
Nossa Senhora da Nazaré	50		

=== Spain ===
Ship	Guns	Commander	Notes
La Galga	56		
San Francisco Javier	52		
Paloma Indiana	52		
San Esteban	50	Jorge Echeverria	
Hermiona	50	José Araña	
Nuestra Señora de la Encina	36		
San Bruno	36		
