= Portuguese ship Nossa Senhora da Vitória =

Ship of the line of the Portuguese Navy (1735–1746)

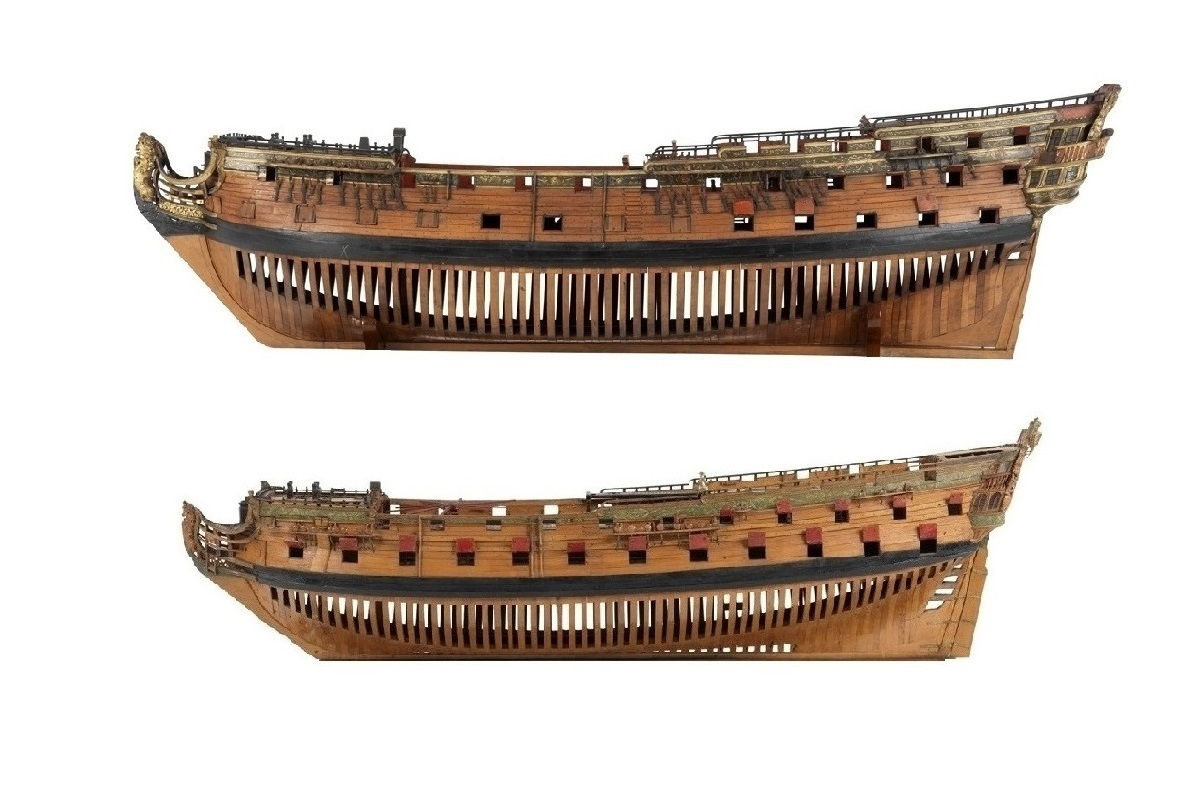
- Above, a wooden ship model of a contemporaneous 70-gun British third-rate ship of the line, similar to the Vitória.

History

Portugal
- Name: Nossa Senhora da Vitória
- Namesake: Our Lady of Victory
- Builder: Ribeira das Naus, Lisbon
- Launched: 19 August 1735
- Commissioned: 1736
- Fate: Ran aground off Mascarene Islands, 1746

General characteristics
- Type: Ship of the line
- Sail plan: Full-rigged ship
- Armament: 74 guns

Nossa Senhora da Vitória was a 74-gun third-rate ship of the line of the Portuguese Navy, built and launched in Lisbon on 19 August 1735.

== Service history ==
She was built at Ribeira das Naus, in Lisbon, and launched on 19 August 1735, with the presence of King John V of Portugal, Queen Maria Anna of Austria and the Portuguese royal family.

In 1736 she was the flagship of the Portuguese Campaign of the River Plate, during the Spanish–Portuguese War (1735–1737).

In 1739 she fought the Maratha ships of Sambhaji Angre on the Indian coast between Karwar and Honnavar.

== Fate ==
Vitória ran aground in 1746, off Mascarene Islands, while returning to Portugal.
