= Captaincy of Santa Catarina =

Former Portuguese captaincy in Brazil

Captaincy of Santa Catarina Capitania de Santa Catarina
- 1738–1821
- Flag

- Brazil in 1750
- Status: Dependent territory
- Capital: Desterro (1738–1777); São Miguel (1777); Desterro (1777–1822)
- Official languages: Portuguese
- Religion: Catholicism

Government
  - Governor 1739 – 1743: José da Silva Pais
  - Governor 1817 – 1821: João Vieira Tovar e Albuquerque
- History
  - Established: 1738
  - Established: 1738
  - End date: 1821
  - Disestablished: 1821 1821
- Today part of: Brazil

The Captaincy of Santa Catarina was an administrative division of colonial Brazil created on August 11, 1738, in the southernmost territories of the Captaincy of São Paulo. The government was officially installed on March 7, 1739, with the first governor being José da Silva Pais.

After the island of Santa Catarina was invaded in 1777, the capital was temporarily moved to São Miguel, now Biguaçu.

On February 28, 1821, it became a province, which would become the current state of Santa Catarina with the Proclamation of the Republic.

The advantageous geographic position of the island of Santa Catarina with the port of Laguna, which was very frequented by ships going from Europe to the Río de la Plata and the Pacific Ocean; and other political reasons determined King João V, in 1738, to form with the island and the adjacent continental land a separate captaincy or government, independent from the Captaincy of São Paulo, to which it had belonged until that time.

The present coastal area of Santa Catarina belonged first to the Captaincy of Santana (1534 -1656), then to the Captaincy of Nossa Senhora do Rosário de Paranaguá (1656 - 1709), which then became part of the Captaincy of São Paulo (1709 - 1738).

== Foundation ==
With the Portuguese expansion to the south of the colony, to the Río de la Plata region, there was a need to form a new administrative unit of the kingdom to guarantee the possession of these lands. Created on August 11, 1738, its government was installed on March 7, 1739, with the arrival of Brigadier José da Silva Pais as its first governor. The territory included the current states of Santa Catarina and Rio Grande do Sul until the latter was emancipated as the Captaincy of Rio Grande de São Pedro in 1760.

Portuguese interests in southern Brazil required the maintenance and strengthening of coastal settlements. To this end, Laguna was elevated to the category of village in 1774 and became an outpost for the conquest of Rio Grande do Sul. From there, expeditions left to reach the colony of Sacramento and Montevideo, and in the journey, they collected cattle and imprisoned Indians. Desterro, being heavily fortified by Silva Pais since his arrival in Santa Catarina, was its capital. Many of the fortresses built in the period, resisted the Spanish occupation of 1777 and the centuries, and are standing to this day.

After 1807, with the creation of the general captaincy of São Pedro do Rio Grande (future Rio Grande do Sul), its borders comprised: To the north, the Saí Guaçu river (Joinville), to the south the Mampituba river (Torres), to the west the Serra Geral, which runs from north to south, closer to the coast and the east of the Atlantic Ocean.

== Azorean Colonization ==
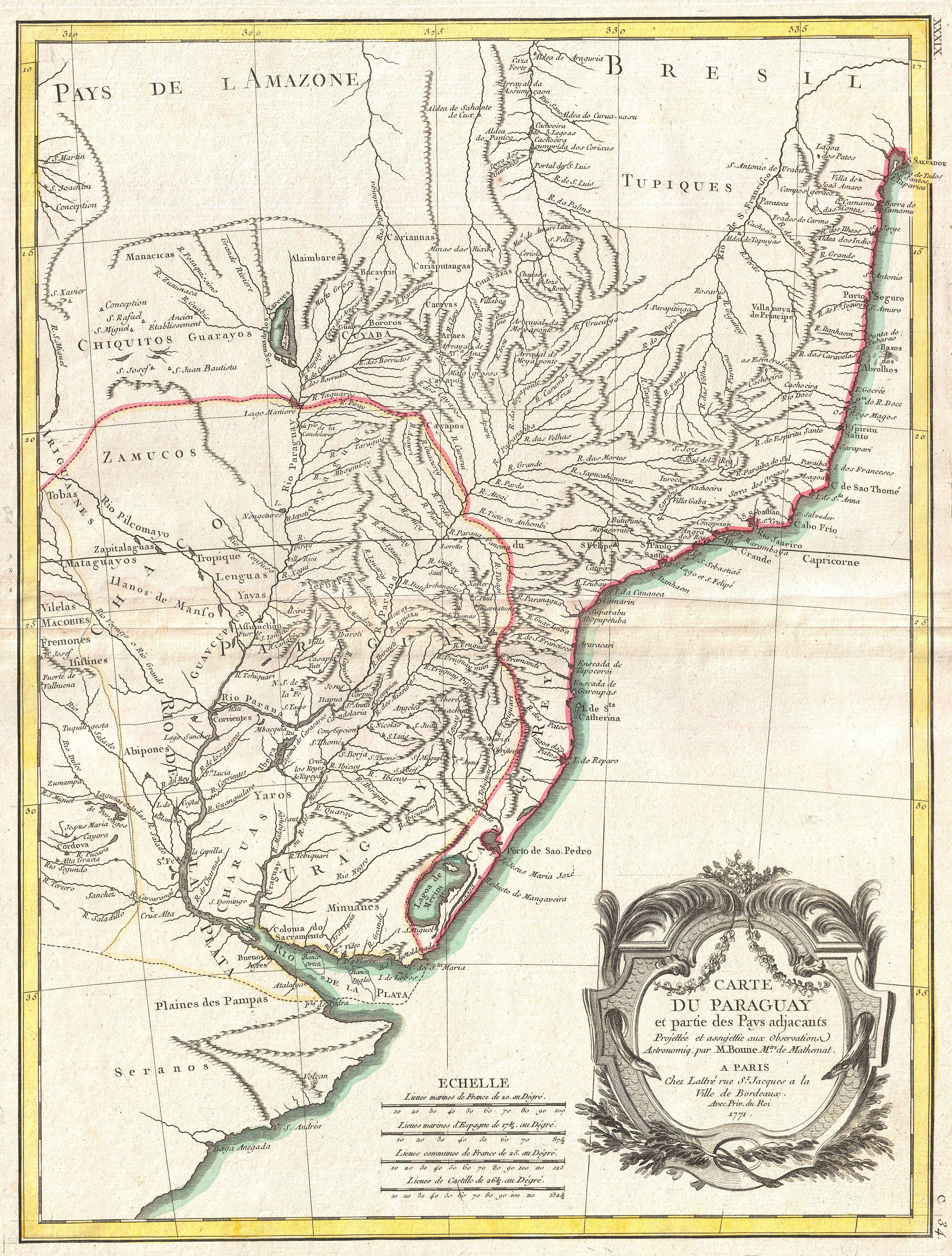
Map of 1771 showing southern Brazil.

The islands of the Azores archipelago, suffering from seismic tremors, stimulated emigration. Allied to this factor would be the precarious economic development of the region, the desire to put out to sea, but mainly the excess population which, as a result, caused food shortages at certain times. From 1748 to 1756, in successive waves, about five thousand Azoreans arrived, most of whom settled along the coast. The new settlers received land grants on the island and the mainland. There were many difficulties, from the terrible conditions of the journey to the adaptation to the land where they were to settle.

== Colonization of the Santa Catarina Plateau ==
Luís António de Sousa Botelho Mourão, the Morgado de Mateus, governor of the São Paulo captaincy, interested in guaranteeing the Portuguese dominion over the current Santa Catarina plateau region and the flow of cattle from Rio Grande do Sul to São Paulo, commissioned a wealthy Paulistan, Antônio Correia Pinto, to establish a settlement at the Lages stop, then under São Paulo's jurisdiction. In 1775 the village of Nossa Senhora dos Prazeres de Lages was founded, which in 1820 was incorporated into Santa Catarina.

== Spanish Domain ==
When war broke out between Portugal and Spain, the island of Santa Catarina was poorly defended despite its strategic importance and abandoned by the Portuguese fleet, which did not want to endanger its ships. The place was taken in 1777 by Pedro de Ceballos, without the invader firing a single shot or losing a single man. From there, the conquest extended from village to village, except for Laguna, which offered resistance. One year later, the island returned to Portuguese hands through the Treaty of Santo Ildefonso.

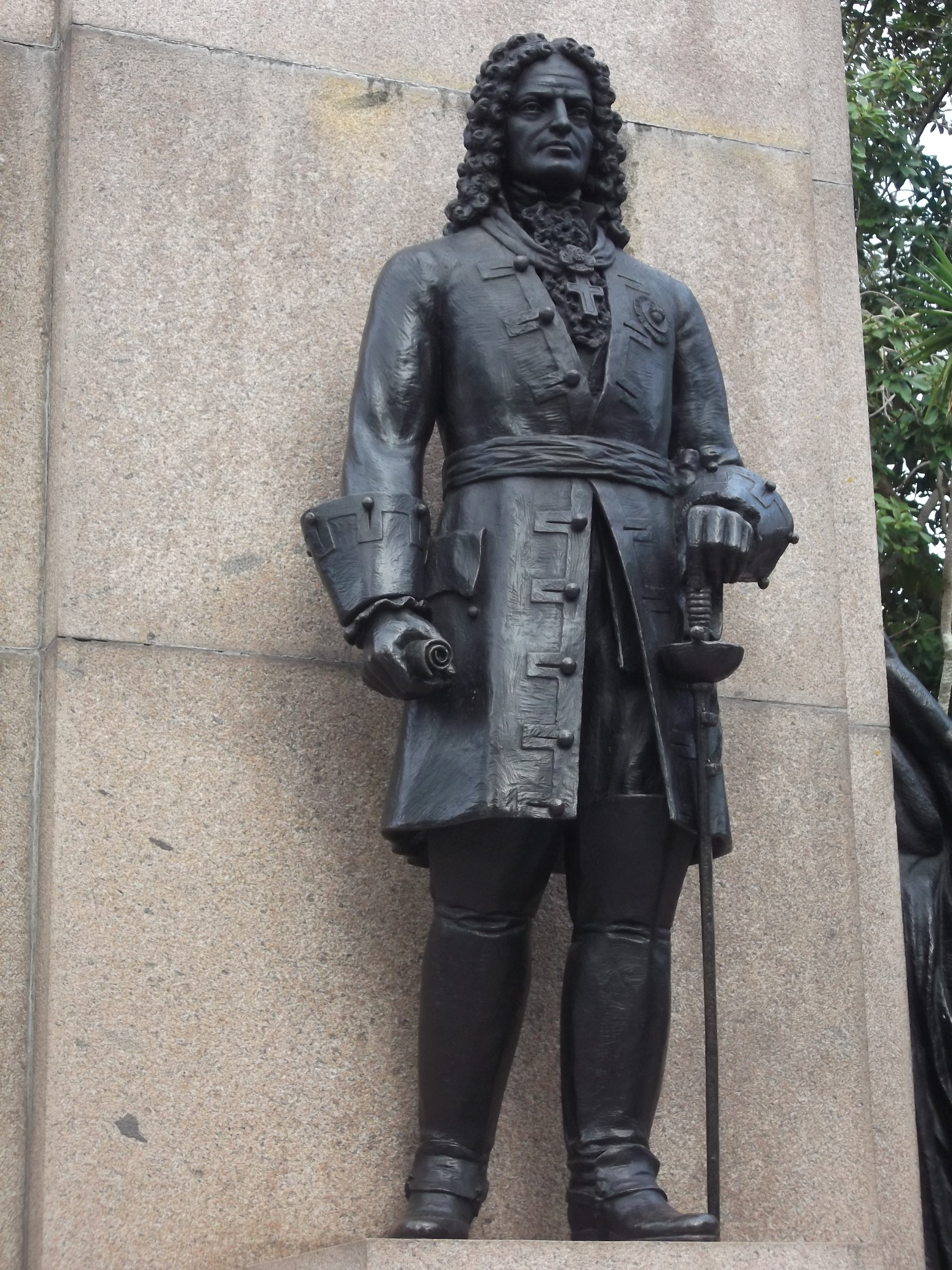
José da Silva Pais.

== Governors ==
Governor of the Captaincy of Santa Catarina	Beginning of the term	End of term
José da Silva Pais	7 March 1739	25 August 1743
Patrício Manuel de Figueiredo	25 January 1744	20 de março de 1746
Pedro de Azambuja Ribeiro	25 August 1743	25 January 1744
José da Silva Pais	20 March 1746	2 February 1749
Manuel Escudeiro Ferreira de Sousa	2 February 1749	25 October 1753
José de Melo Manuel	25 October 1753	7 March 1762
Francisco Antônio Cardoso de Meneses e Sousa	7 March 1762	12 July 1765
Francisco de Sousa e Meneses	12 July 1765	5 September 1775
Pedro Antônio da Gama Freitas	5 September 1775	23 February 1777
Domínio espanhol	23 February 1777	12 August 1778
Francisco Antônio da Veiga Cabral da Câmara	12 August 1778	5 July 1779
Francisco de Barros Morais Araújo Teixeira Homem	5 July 1779	7 July 1786
José Pereira Pinto	7 July 1786	7 January 1791
Manuel Soares de Coimbra	7 January 1791	8 July 1793
João Alberto Miranda Ribeiro	8 July 1793	18 January 1800
Santa Catarina's governing body of 1800	18 January 1800	8 December 1800
Joaquim Xavier Curado	8 December 1800	3 June 1805
Luís Maurício da Silveira	3 June 1805	14 July 1817
João Vieira Tovar e Albuquerque	14 July 1817	20 July 1821
Tomás Joaquim Pereira Valente	20 July 1821	20 May 1822
