= Olívio Dutra =

Brazilian politician (born 1941)

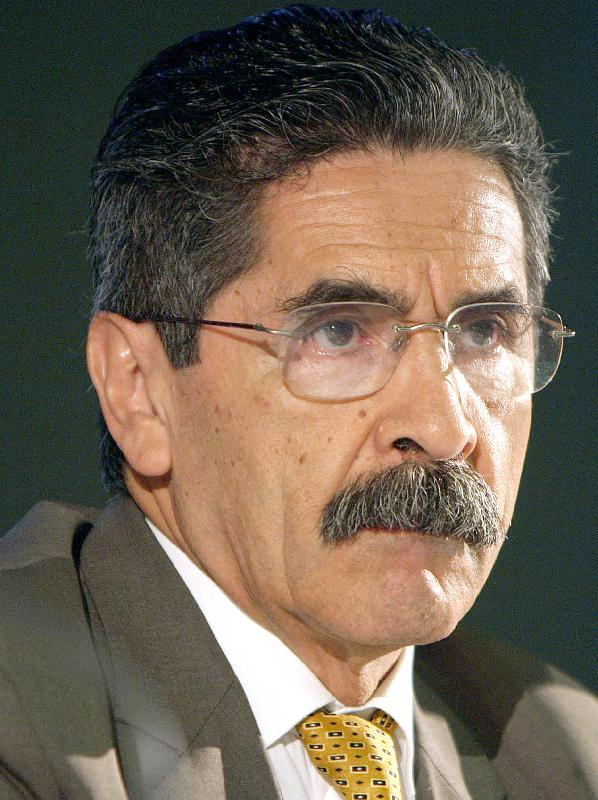

Minister of Cities
- In office 1 January 2003 – 20 July 2005
- President: Luiz Inácio Lula da Silva
- Preceded by: Office established
- Succeeded by: Márcio Fortes

Governor of Rio Grande do Sul
- In office 1 January 1999 – 1 January 2003
- Vice Governor: Miguel Rossetto
- Preceded by: Antônio Britto
- Succeeded by: Germano Rigotto

Mayor of Porto Alegre
- In office 1 January 1989 – 1 January 1993
- Vice Mayor: Tarso Genro (1989–92)
- Preceded by: Alceu Collares
- Succeeded by: Tarso Genro

National President of the Workers' Party
- In office 17 January 1988 – 11 December 1988
- Preceded by: Luiz Inácio Lula da Silva
- Succeeded by: Luiz Gushiken

Federal Deputy for Rio Grande do Sul
- In office 1 February 1987 – 1 January 1989

Personal details
- Born: 10 June 1941 (age 84) Bossoroca, Rio Grande do Sul, Brazil
- Party: Workers' Party (1980–present)
- Spouse: Judite Dutra
- Occupation: Administrator, politician
- Profession: Linguist

Olívio de Oliveira Dutra (Brazilian Portuguese pronunciation: [oˈlivju ˈdutɾɐ]; born 10 June 1941 in Bossoroca, Rio Grande do Sul) is a Brazilian politician. He is a founding member of the Workers' Party.

== Early political career (1961-1989) ==
Dutra graduated in Grammar school and became an employee of Banrisul, Rio Grande do Sul's then state owned bank, on 1961. In that position, he became familiarized with the Porto Alegre Bank Workers Union. He was elected president of the organization in 1975. On 1979 he organized a major strike of the government employees. For that reason, he was arrested by the political police of the military dictatorship and lost his term as the union's president.

During the redemocratization of Brazilian politics, Dutra participated of the foundation of the Workers' Party section in his state, of which he was the president from 1980 to 1986. On the 1982 gubernatorial elections, the first in over twenty years, he ran as the Workers' Party candidate. He received unexpressive voting, coming in last place with a little over 50,000 votes. In 1986, Dutra was elected Constitutional Congressman with over 55,000 votes. While living in Brasília, Dutra shared an apartment with Luiz Inácio Lula da Silva, also a Congressman and the future President of Brazil. They have been close friends ever since.

== Mayor of Porto Alegre (1989–1993) ==
Dutra was elected mayor of Porto Alegre in 1988 with 34% of the vote. According to pre-election polls, Congressman Antônio Britto from the Brazilian Democratic Movement Party had been the favorite candidate. He finished third, behind fellow Congressman Carlos Araújo of the Democratic Labour Party. Araújo belonged to the same party as the city's then-incumbent mayor, Alceu Collares. At that time Brazilian electoral law did not allow the dispute of a second round if any of the candidates failed to achieve more than half of the valid votes.

Dutra's term was the first of four consecutive terms of the Workers' Party in the city. During the next 16 years Porto Alegre became the figurehead for the party throughout Brazil: it experimented innovatively and successfully.

Dutra's administration was criticized for its intervention on the public transportation system, what generated bad relations between the City Hall and the bus concessionaire companies, forcing the government to pay them an indemnification.

== Governor of Rio Grande do Sul (1999–2003) ==
After his term as mayor Dutra contested the governorship for a second time in 1994. He won 35% of the vote in the first round and finished second behind Britto with 47.79% in the second round. In the 1998-gubernatorial contest Dutra beat Britto by 97 thousand votes. Dutra's campaign criticized Britto as a neoliberal having privatized the state's telephony and energy companies.

Dutra's term as governor was marked by the suspension of agreements to open (General Motors and Ford) car manufacturing companies in the state. Those deals, agreed by Britto's administration, had given the companies generous tax exemption and credit at below-market rates. Only GM accepted Dutra's renegotiated terms. Other accomplishments Dutra's term include the creation of a state university and the introduction of the participatory budgeting at state level, following the previous experience of its implementation in Porto Alegre by his party.

Dutra was politically worn out during his term, suffering an extensive, defamation campaign promoted by (Rede Globo's local affiliate) RBS media and major defeats in the State Assembly.

Dutra's reelection campaign was rejected in the Workers' Party primaries, where the then-Mayor of Porto Alegre Tarso Genro was selected.

== Recent political activity (2003–present) ==
In 2002, Luiz Inácio Lula da Silva was elected president, and appointed Dutra as Minister of Cities, a then recently created office. He would remain on this job until 2005, when Lula needed to reorganize the Brazilian cabinet to suit the Progressive Party in it. Dutra was then replaced by Márcio Fortes in a negotiation of the government with then President of the Congress Severino Cavalcanti.

In 2006, Dutra was the Workers' Party gubernatorial candidate for Rio Grande do Sul for a fourth time. He was defeated by then Congresswoman Yeda Crusius of the Brazilian Social Democratic Party on a second round by a margin of 7.88% of the votes.

Political offices
Preceded by Alceu Collares	Mayor of Porto Alegre; 1989–1993	Succeeded by Tarso Genro
Preceded by Antônio Britto	Governor of Rio Grande do Sul; 1999–2003	Succeeded by Germano Rigotto
Preceded by none	Minister of Cities; 2003–2005	Succeeded by Márcio Fortes de Almeida
