= Choque da Uva =

Brazilian meme

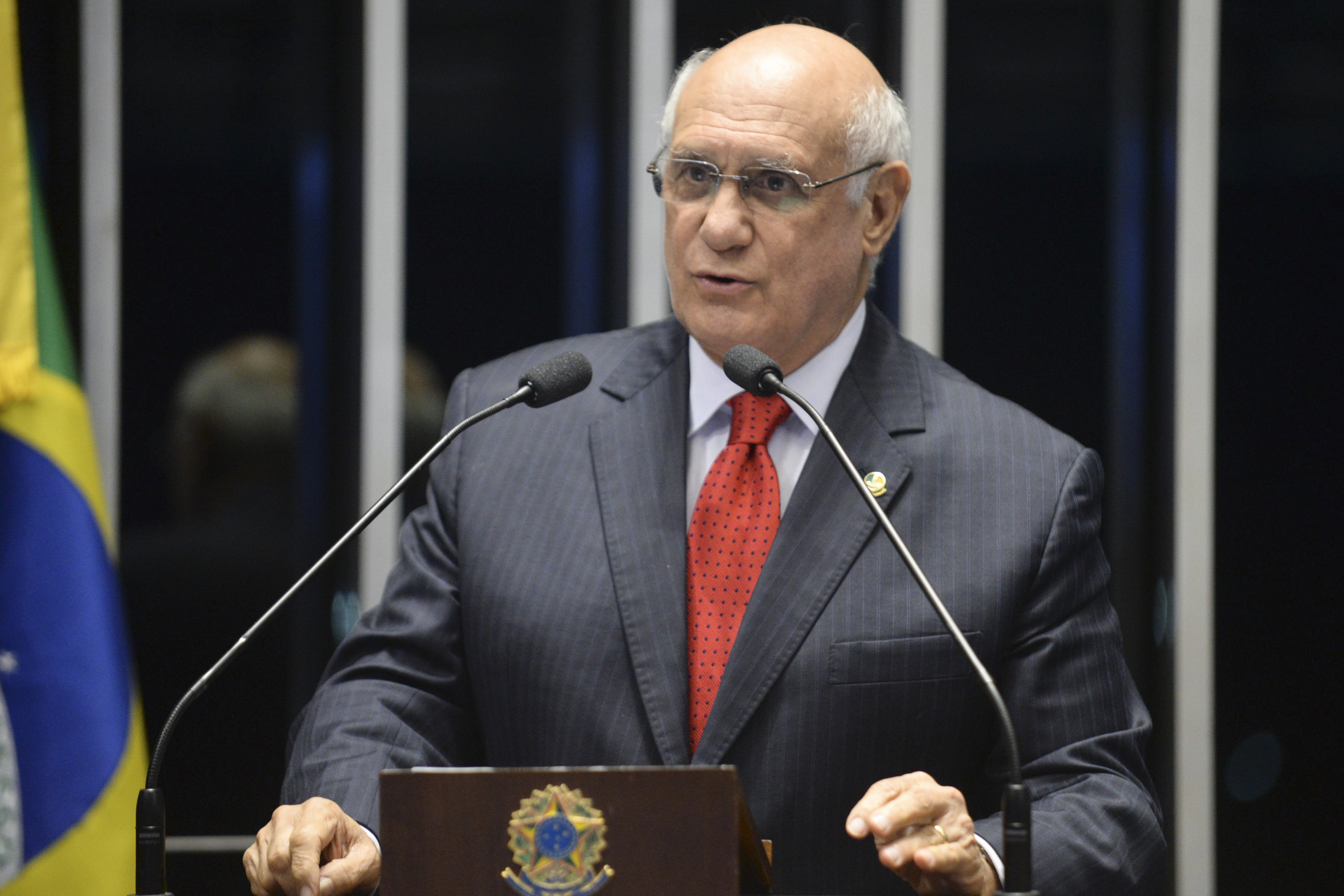
Lasier Martins delivering a speech in March 2016.

Choque da Uva (lit. 'Grape Shock'), also known as Choque na Festa da Uva (Shock at the Grape Festival) or Lasier Martins Tomando Choque (Lasier Martins Having a Shock) refers to an electric shock that Brazilian journalist Lasier Martins suffered at the Grape Festival, in Caxias do Sul, during Jornal do Almoço, on RBS TV. The incident, which happened in 1996, became an internet meme from 2006, when a video of the occurrence was uploaded onto YouTube. Lasier criticized its spread, but did not file a lawsuit. The shock was repeated on Jornal do Almoço in 2010, where it was selected as the most noteworthy moment in the program. Lasier used the occurrence in his campaign for the Senate in 2014.

== Origin ==
The incident happened on February 21, 1996, during a live coverage on Jornal do Almoço, aired on TV Globo affiliate RBS TV, at the Grape Festival (Festa da Uva) in Caxias do Sul. Before the broadcast, the location presented bunches of wine grapes in a metal case. Due to the harmful reflex to filming, the event organizers removed the glass. However, the journalist who covered the matter, Lasier Martins — holding a microphone and wet because of the rain — wasn't warned that the case was electrified, and wanted to highlight the largest grape bunch of grapes, which was tied by a wire to the case's metal grid. As consequence, he got hit by a 220-volt shock. According to him, "I got a huge shock and plopped into the ground, for the overall panic of those who were around me and thousands of viewers who were following the broadcast". He was left unconscious for a few seconds, and went to hospital because he broke a rib. In an interview, Lasier noted: "I got a knockdown shock. If I fell front-sided, I could have died stuck to the electric cable. Since I escaped from the back, I released the cable, but I broke a rib". Later, he returned on air, explaining the situation.

== Repercussion and response ==
I don't give a damn, but that shock made me suffer a lot. I almost died, I spent three months without sleeping properly and it was very painful. If you have a painful experience that is naturally not your favorite topic. Who has never been shocked? Mine was only 220 volts.

— Lasier in an interview to iG.

Initially, the incident was deemed "forgotten", but saw a surge in popularity in 2006, when it was uploaded onto YouTube. In February 2019, the upload had over five million views. About the case, Lasier commented: "That was one of the most regrettable and painful situations I have experienced to date. Both the shock and the spread on YouTube". However, he did not take legal action: "if the video is removed, someone goes there and puts it again". In another interview, he told: "I never imagined it would have that repercussion, but I confess that it never bothered me. People give more attention to that than me. It's just a shame because I have much more important achievements in my 50 years in media".

In 2010, in the premiere of the new version of Jornal do Almoço, viewers elected the shock as the most iconic moment in the program's history. The scenes were repeated, showing behind-the-scenes footage of the moment. Lasier, who was in the studio, commented: "I never wanted to see it, and that was already 14 years ago". In an interview to Folha, he repeated a complaint he made on the program: "People like to laugh at other people's suffering; even more so when it doesn't result in something fatal. If I fell to the front, I could have died".

In 2014, he became candidate for senator of the Democratic Labor Party (PDT). On September 5, he registered a police report for pranking a young man, who pretended to suffer from an electric shock when greeting him. He said that would be "a movement to demoralize me on the internet", as another young man was recording the incident. However, on September 15, he said during his party's televised campaign slot: "We have agreed: I take jokes about electric shock as a joke and you take my proposals for the Senate seriously. A health shock. A shock in education. A shock on the waste of public money". In an interview, Lasier told: "I don't care if the jokes stop or not [if I'm elected by the Senate]. I will fight hard in congress for the common good". He was elected with 37,42% of the valid votes.

The scene was repeated again on Jornal do Almoço on February 25, 2019.

=== Legacy ===
Newspaper O Povo considered it to be "one of the most classic scenes of Brazilian television". The incident was included in several lists, such as "Greatest TV bloopers" on Veja São Paulo, "some of the best Brazilian memes" on R10, "most loved YouTube videos" on 33Giga, "most famous memes on the net" on GZH, "20 most well loved YouTube virals" on Super and "greatest memes of the history of the Internet" on TechTudo. Estadão cited the case in its posting "Remember bizarre situations experienced by reporters", declaring on the episode: "One of the most well remembered moments on Brazilian television when it comes to unforeseen events". The meme is cited in the book Os 198 Maiores Memes Brasileiros que Você Respeita (The 198 Greatest Brazilian Memes that You Respect, by Kleyson Barbosa.

== Additional reading ==
- "Episódio #01: Uva dá choque?". Choque da Uva (Podcast).
