= Pedro Simon =

Brazilian politician and lawyer

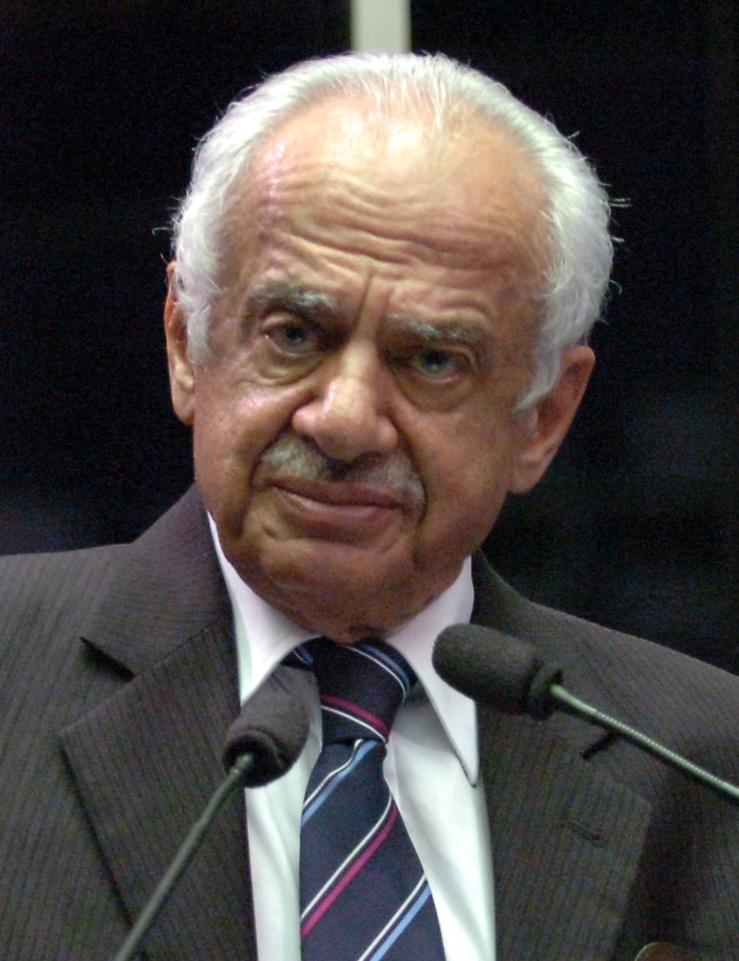

Senator from Rio Grande do Sul
- In office February 1, 1991 – February 1, 2015
- Preceded by: Carlos Chiarelli
- Succeeded by: Lasier Martins

30th Governor of Rio Grande do Sul
- In office March 15, 1987 – April 1, 1990
- Vice Governor: Sinval Guazzelli
- Preceded by: Jair Soares
- Succeeded by: Sinval Guazzelli

Minister of Agriculture of Brazil
- In office March 15, 1985 – February 14, 1986
- President: José Sarney
- Preceded by: Nestor Jost
- Succeeded by: Iris Rezende

Member of the Legislative Assembly of Rio Grande do Sul
- In office January 31, 1963 – January 31, 1979

Personal details
- Born: January 31, 1930 (age 96) Caxias do Sul, Rio Grande do Sul
- Party: Brazilian Democratic Movement Party
- Profession: Lawyer

Pedro Jorge Simon (born January 31, 1930) is a Brazilian politician, lawyer and professor. He represented Rio Grande do Sul in the Federal Senate for over 30 years. Prior to that, he served as the governor of Rio Grande do Sul from 1987 to 1990. Simon also served as Minister of Agriculture from 1985 to 1986. He is a member of the Brazilian Democratic Movement and an important historical figure of the movement towards redemocratization in Brazil.

== Biography ==
Pedro Simon is a descendant of Lebanese immigrants who arrived in Caxias do Sul in 1922 with other catholic families such as Sehbe, Kalil and David. A law major from the Pontifical Catholic University of Rio Grande do Sul with a postgraduate degree in political economy, and also a specialist in criminal law, Simon was a professor at the University of Caxias do Sul. Simon made several study travels, both as an academic and as a politician, to countries in Europe and Latin America, in addition to Canada, the United States, Lebanon, Egypt, India, Japan, Syria, Pakistan, Thailand, among others. In Paris, he attended Sorbonne University.

He began his political career in the Brazilian Labour Party, his first important position being that of city councilor of his hometown, Caxias do Sul. In 1962 he was elected to the Legislative Assembly of Rio Grande do Sul. During the military regime in Brazil, bipartisanship was established, and Simon joined the Brazilian Democratic Movement. He remained in the position of state deputy until 1978, the year he was first elected to the Federal Senate. From 1985 to 1986, he was Minister of Agriculture in the government of Tancredo Neves. He left the position to run for the governorship of Rio Grande do Sul for a second time, this time successfully. He resigned as governor in 1990 and was elected once again to the Federal Senate, where he remained until 2015.

He is a widower of Tânia Simon, who died in 1985. They had three children. Today he is married to Ivete, with whom he had another son, Pedro.
