= Germano Rigotto =

Brazilian politician (born 1949)

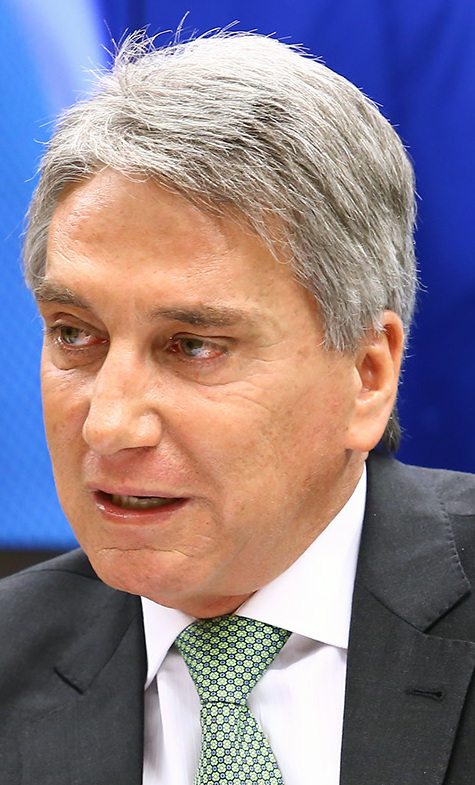
- Germano Rigotto in 2015

Governor of Rio Grande do Sul
- In office 1 January 2003 – 1 January 2007
- Vice Governor: Antônio Hohlfeldt
- Preceded by: Olívio Dutra
- Succeeded by: Yeda Crusius

Federal Deputy for Rio Grande do Sul
- In office 1 February 1991 – 1 January 2003

State Deputy of Rio Grande do Sul
- In office 1 February 1983 – 1 February 1991

City Councillor of Caxias do Sul
- In office 1 January 1977 – 1 January 1981

Personal details
- Born: 24 September 1949 (age 77) Caxias do Sul, Rio Grande do Sul, Brazil
- Party: MDB (1976–present)
- Spouse: Claudia Elisa Eberle Scavino
- Children: Rafael; Roberta
- Education: Federal University of Rio Grande do Sul (UFRGS)

Germano Antônio Rigotto (born 24 September 1949, in Caxias do Sul) is a Brazilian politician currently affiliated to the MDB.

He was the Governor of Rio Grande do Sul state until 1 January 2007. He ran for a second term in October 2006 elections, but he was unexpectedly defeated by Olívio Dutra and Yeda Crusius. Rigotto placed third by a small margin: 0.17% behind Olivio Dutra. In August 2018, Rigotto was nominated as vice presidential candidate along with Henrique Meirelles for the 2018 elections.

Political offices
Preceded by Olívio Dutra	35th Governor of Rio Grande do Sul; 2003–07	Succeeded by Yeda Crusius
Party political offices
Preceded by Michel Temer	MDB nominee for Vice President of Brazil; 2018	Most recent
