= Alceu Collares =

Brazilian politician and lawyer (1927–2024)

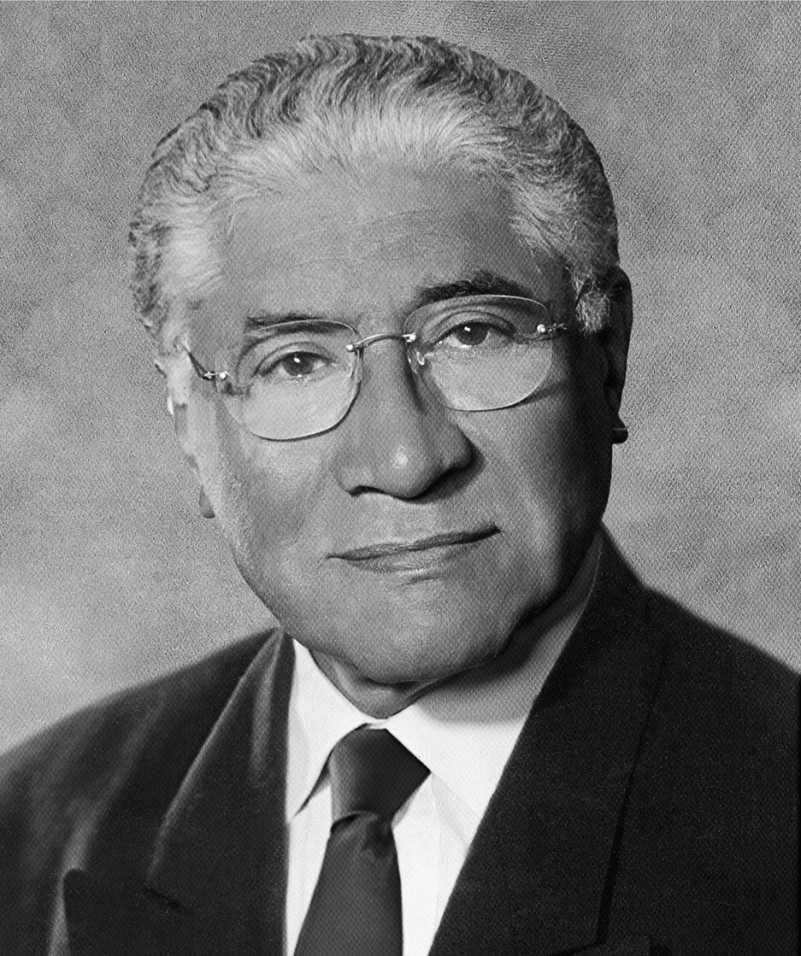

Governor of Rio Grande do Sul
- In office 1 January 1991 – 1 January 1995
- Preceded by: Sinval Guazzelli
- Succeeded by: Antônio Britto

Mayor of Porto Alegre
- In office 1 January 1986 – 1 January 1989
- Preceded by: João Antonio Dib
- Succeeded by: Olívio Dutra

Personal details
- Born: Alceu de Deus Collares; 12 September 1927 Bagé, Rio Grande do Sul, Brazil
- Died: 24 December 2024 (aged 97) Porto Alegre, Rio Grande do Sul, Brazil
- Party: Democratic Labor
- Spouse(s): Antônia Collares; Neuza Canabarro
- Education: Federal University of Rio Grande do Sul

Alceu de Deus Collares (12 September 1927 – 24 December 2024) was a Brazilian politician and lawyer. He was the Governor of Rio Grande do Sul state (1991–95), and was also a member of the Chamber of Deputies and Mayor of Porto Alegre (1986–89).

Collares was a member of the Democratic Labor Party of Brazil. He died of pneumonia on 24 December 2024, at the age of 97.
