= Festa da Uva =

Festival of Italian culture in Brazil

Festa da Uva Festa Nacional da Uva
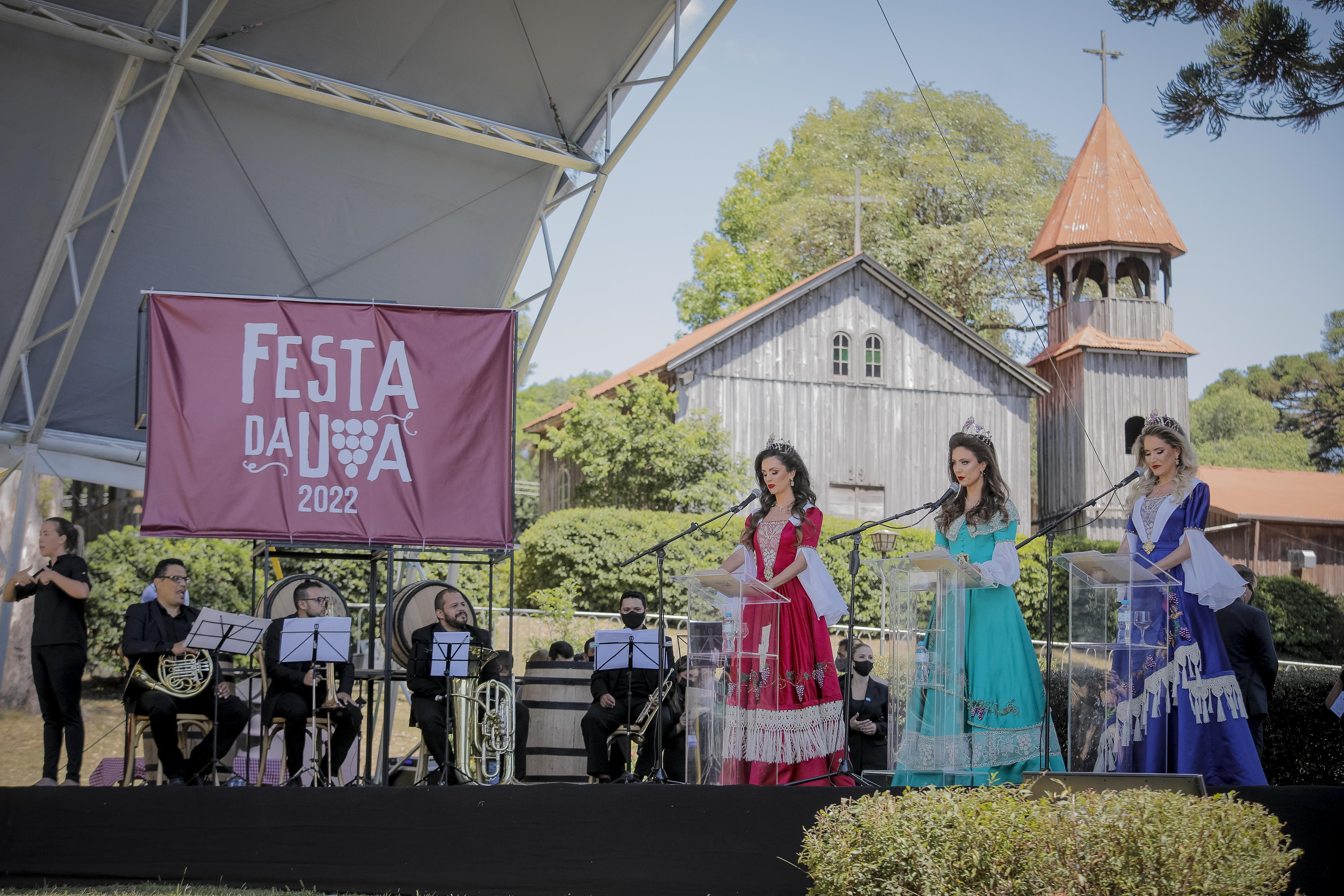
- Status: Active
- Genre: Festival / Exhibition
- Dates: 18 days in February and March in even-numbered years
- Frequency: Biennial
- Venue: Festa da Uva Pavilions
- Locations: Caxias do Sul, Rio Grande do Sul
- Coordinates: 29.146110°S 51.198379°W
- Country: Brazil
- Inaugurated: 1930
- Previous event: February 15 – March 3, 2024
- Next event: 2026
- Website: festadauva.com.br

Festa da Uva (English: Grape Festival) is a celebration of Italian heritage and culture held biennially in Caxias do Sul, Rio Grande do Sul, in southern Brazil. The Festa da Uva is held in February of every even-numbered year. During the Festa da Uva, the Caxias do Sul pavilions host attractions mainly from South America, but also from other regions of the world. Visitors taste cheese, grapes, and various Brazilian wines. The large crowds also draw independent vendors who promote local-themed products from the southern gaúcho state.

The Festa hosts parades that process through the city nightly. A Rainha (Queen) and two Princesas (Princesses) are chosen after competition in a beauty pageant to reign over the Festa. A queen was first selected for the Festa da Uva in 1933.

== History ==
The Festa da Uva first started in 1931 as a harvest festival. The harvest in Brazil falls in February/March since the country is in the Southern Hemisphere. Colonel Miguel Muratore, Mayor of Caxias do Sul in 1931, gave organizers the necessary support to get the Festa off and running.

The Festa went on hiatus from 1938–1949 because of economic instability in the city and surrounding Italian region, due in part to the effects of World War II, when Italy was an enemy of the Allies. The festival promoted Italian culture.

== See also ==
- History of Caxias do Sul
- Festa da Uva (Ponta Grossa)
- Choque da Uva
