= José da Silva Pais =

Silva Pais
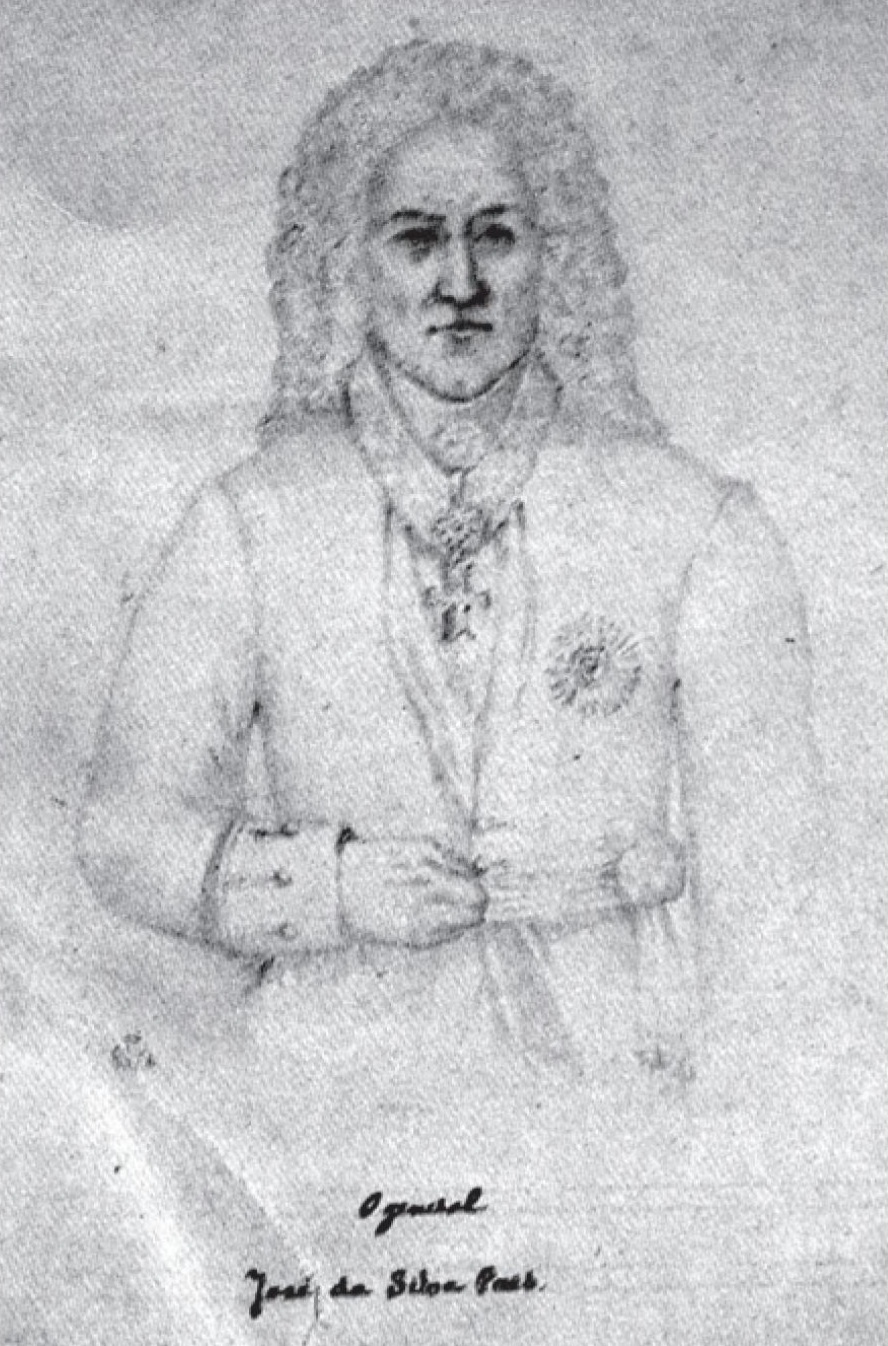
- Portrait by unknown author, 18th century

Governor of Rio Grande do Sul
- In office 1737–1737
- Monarch: John V
- Preceded by: Office established
- Succeeded by: André Ribeiro Coutinho

Governor of Santa Catarina
- In office 7 March 1739 – 25 August 1743
- Monarch: John V
- Preceded by: António de Oliveira Bastos
- Succeeded by: Patrício Manuel de Figueiredo

Governor of Santa Catarina
- In office 20 March 1746 – 2 February 1749
- Monarch: John V
- Preceded by: Pedro de Azambuja Ribeiro
- Succeeded by: Manuel Escudeiro Ferreira de Sousa

Personal details
- Born: 25 October 1679 Lisbon, Kingdom of Portugal
- Died: 17 November 1760 (aged 81) Lisbon, Kingdom of Portugal
- Spouse: Máxima Teresa da Silva

Military service
- Allegiance: Portuguese Empire
- Branch/service: Army
- Rank: Brigadier general
- Battles/wars: Spanish–Portuguese War (1735–1737)

José da Silva Pais (25 October 1679 – 14 November 1760) was a Portuguese soldier, military engineer and colonial administrator in the Portuguese colony of Brazil.

He was involved in diverse situations in the disputed territories between the Portuguese and Spanish in the territory that today is the South region in Brazil. He organized the support for the Sacramento Colony during the Spanish–Portuguese War (1735–1737), and went head-to-head with his Spanish rival, Don Pedro de Ceballos Cortez y Calderón.

For the purpose of maintaining the southern territory in the hands of Portugal, Pais founded the city of Rio Grande in 1737 and projected and built the Fort Jesus Maria e José. That area was the object of the Spanish incursions commanded by Pedro de Ceballos, who invaded it twice.

On Santa Catarina Island, when it was in Spanish hands under the authority of Pedro de Ceballos, the Brigadier General Pais invaded and took the island for Portugal, placing himself as governor. He remained governor of the captaincy of Santa Catarina from 1739 until 1745.

He planned the construction of forts which would constitute the defense of Santa Catarina Island: in the north, Fortaleza de São José da Ponta Grossa, Fortaleza de Santa Cruz de Anhatomirim, and Fortaleza de Santo António de Ratones; and in the south: Fortaleza de Nossa Senhora da Conceição de Araçatuba.
