= 2022 Rio Grande do Sul gubernatorial election =

Regional elections in Brazil

2022 Rio Grande do Sul state election
- 2 October 2022 (first round); 30 October 2022 (second round)
- Opinion polls
- Gubernatorial election
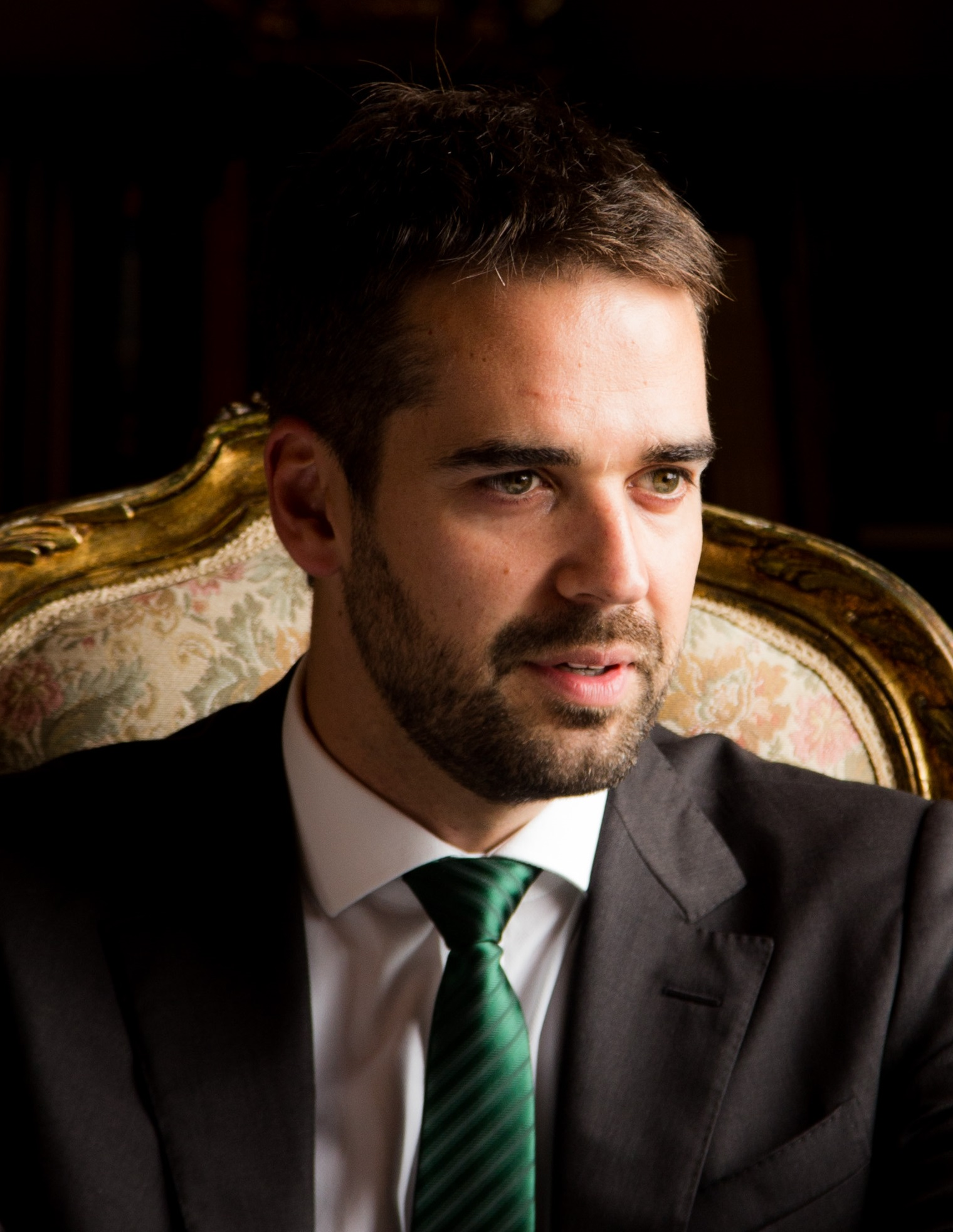

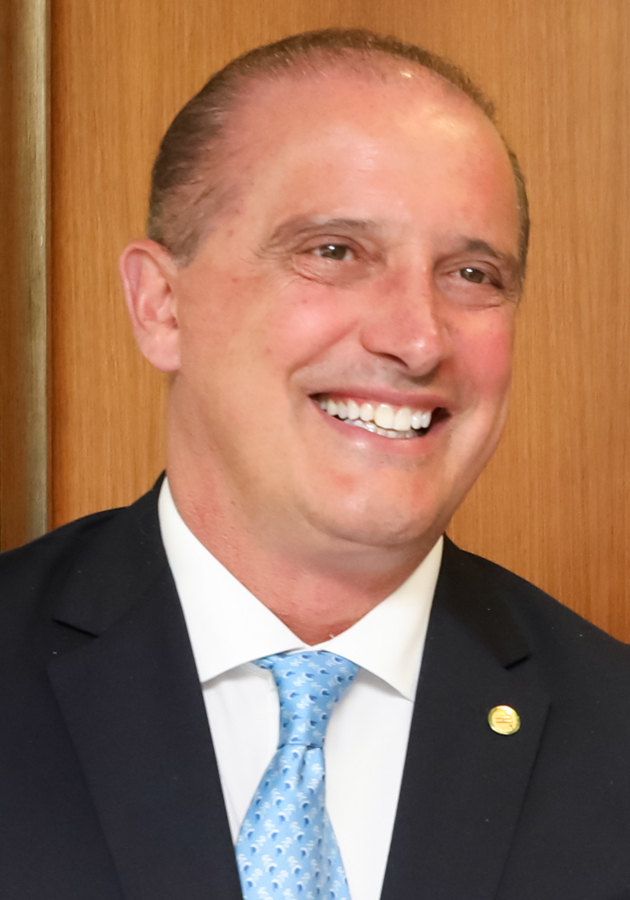
Candidate	Eduardo Leite	Onyx Lorenzoni
Party	PSDB	PL
Alliance	A Unique Rio Grande (Note: The coalition A Unique Rio Grande was composed by the Always Forward federation (itself composed by parties PSDB and Cidadania), and parties MDB, UNIÃO, PSD and PODE)	To Defend and Transform Rio Grande (Note: The coalition To Defend and Transform Rio Grande was composed by PL, Republicanos, PROS and Patriota)
Running mate	Gabriel Souza	Cláudia Jardim
Popular vote	3,687,126	2,767,786
Percentage	57.12%	42.88%
Governor before election
Ranolfo Vieira Júnior
PSDB
Elected Governor
Eduardo Leite
PSDB
- Parliamentary election
- All 55 seats of the Legislative Assembly
Party	Leader	Vote %	Seats	+/–
Legislative Assembly
PT	Pepe Vargas	17.85	11	+3
PP	Frederico Antunes	11.23	7	+1
MDB	Carlos Búrigo	10.20	6	−2
Republicanos	Fran Somensi	8.84	5	+3
PL	Paparico Bacchi	8.42	5	+3
PDT	Juliana Brizola	7.57	4	0
PSDB	Mateus Wesp	7.19	5	+1
UNIÃO	Aloísio Classmann	4.95	3	New
PSOL	Luciana Genro	4.63	2	+1
PODE	Airton Lima	3.18	2	+1
PSD	Gaúcho da Geral	2.93	1	0
PSB	Dalciso Oliveira	2.45	1	−2
NOVO	Giuseppe Riesgo	2.38	1	−1
PTB	Elizandro Sabino	1.72	1	−4
Cidadania	Any Ortiz	1.61	0	−1
This lists parties that won seats. See the complete results below.
- Senatorial election
- 2 October 2022 (one-only round)
- Opinion polls
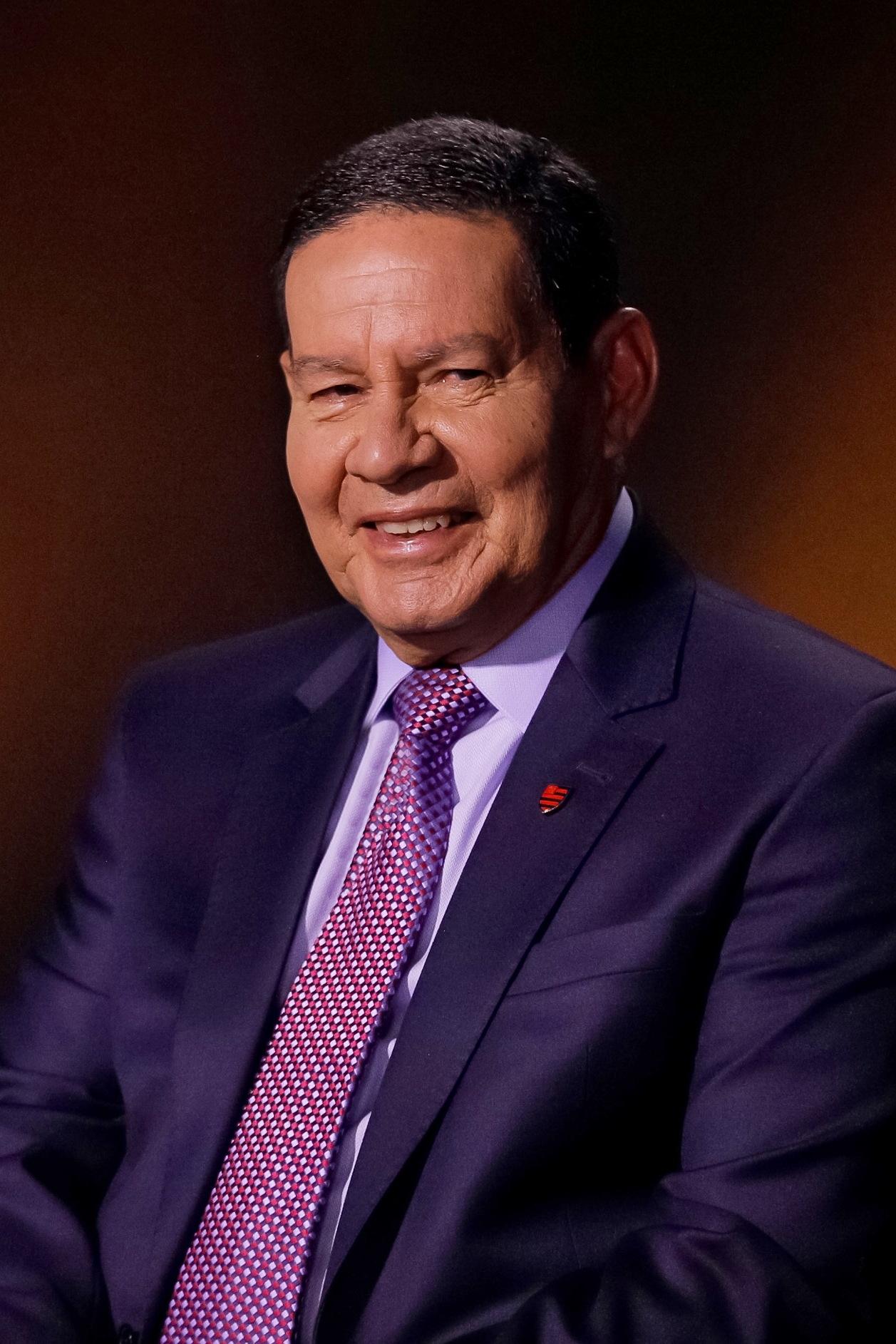

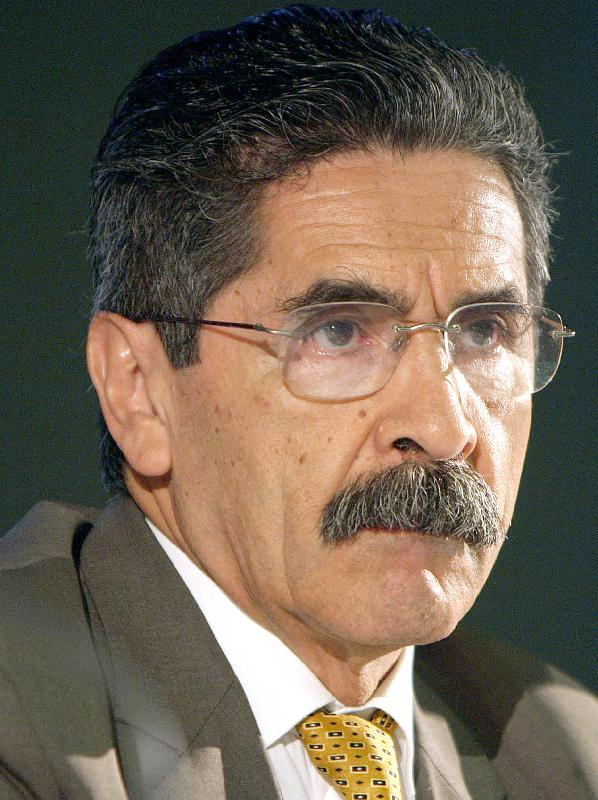
Candidate	Hamilton Mourão	Olívio Dutra
Party	Republicanos	PT
Alliance	To Defend and Transform Rio Grande	Hope Front
Popular vote	2,593,294	2,225,458
Percentage	44.11%	37.85%
Senator before election
Lasier Martins
PODE
Elected Senator
Hamilton Mourão
Republicanos

The 2022 Rio Grande do Sul state election took place in the state of Rio Grande do Sul, Brazil on 2 October 2022. Voters elected a Governor, Vice Governor, one Senator, 31 representatives for the Chamber of Deputies and 55 Legislative Assembly members, with a possible second round to be held on 30 October 2022. Former governor Eduardo Leite, was eligible for a second term and announced that he's running for reelection.

The 2022 electoral process was marked by the succession to the position held by the incumbent governor, Ranolfo Vieira Júnior, from the Brazilian Social Democracy Party (PSDB), the running mate of Leite in 2018 Rio Grande do Sul gubernatorial election. He took office on 31 March 2022 with Leite's resignation. For the election to the Federal Senate, the seat occupied by Lasier Martins (PODE), who was elected in 2014 by the Democratic Labour Party (PDT), was at dispute.

== Electoral calendar ==
Note: This section only presents the main dates of the 2022 electoral calendar, check the TSE official website (in Portuguese) and other official sources for detailed information.

Electoral calendar
15 May	Start of crowdfunding of candidates
20 July to 5 August	Party conventions for choosing candidates and coalitions
16 August to 30 September	Period of exhibition of free electoral propaganda on radio, television and on the internet related to the first round
2 October	First round of 2022 elections
7 October to 28 October	Period of exhibition of free electoral propaganda on radio, television and on the internet related to a possible second round
30 October	Possible second round of 2022 elections
until 19 December	Delivery of electoral diplomas for those who were elected in the 2022 elections by the Brazilian Election Justice

== Gubernatorial candidates ==
The party conventions began on 20 July and continued until 5 August. The following political parties have already confirmed their candidacies. Political parties had until 15 August 2022 to formally register their candidates.

=== Candidates in runoff ===
Party	Candidate	Most relevant political office or occupation	Party	Running mate	Coalition	Electoral number	TV time per party/coalition	Refs.
Brazilian Social Democracy Party (PSDB)	Eduardo Leite	Governor of Rio Grande do Sul (2019–2022)	Brazilian Democratic Movement	Gabriel Souza	One Only Rio Grande: Always Forward (PSDB and Cidadania); Brazilian Democratic Movement (MDB); Brazil Union (UNIÃO); Social Democratic Party (PSD); Podemos (PODE)	45		
Liberal Party (PL)	Onyx Lorenzoni	Ministry of Labour and Social Security (2021–2022)	Liberal Party (PL)	Cláudia Jardim	To Defend and Transform Rio Grande: Liberal Party (PL); Republicanos; Republican Party of the Social Order (PROS); Patriota	22		

=== Candidates failing to make runoff ===
Party	Candidate	Most relevant political office or occupation	Party	Running mate	Coalition	Electoral number	Ref.
Workers' Party (PT)	Edegar Pretto	State Deputy for Rio Grande do Sul (2011 – present)	Socialism and Liberty Party (PSOL)	Pedro Ruas	Hope Front: Brazil of Hope (PT, PCdoB and PV); PSOL REDE Federation (PSOL and REDE)	13	
Progressistas (PP)	Luis Carlos Heinze	Senator for Rio Grande do Sul (2019 – present)	Brazilian Labour Party (PTB)	Tanise Sabino	Work and Progress: Progressistas (PP); Brazilian Labour Party (PTB); Brazilian Labour Renewal Party (PRTB)	11	
Democratic Labour Party (PDT)	Vieira da Cunha	Secretary of Education of the State of Rio Grande do Sul (2015–2016)	Democratic Labour Party (PDT)	Regina Costa	PDT Avante: Democratic Labour Party (PDT); Avante	12	
Social Christian Party (PSC)	Roberto Argenta	Federal Deputy from Rio Grande do Sul (1999–2003)	Solidariedade	Nivea Rosa	Christian Humanist Front: Social Christian Party (PSC); Solidariedade; Agir	20	
Brazilian Communist Party (PCB)	Carlos Messala	Public servant.	Brazilian Communist Party (PCB)	Edson Canabarro	TBA	21	
New Party (NOVO)	Ricardo Jobim	Lawyer and entrepreneur.	New Party (NOVO)	Rafael Dresch	None.	30	
United Socialist Workers' Party (PSTU)	Rejane Oliveira	No prior public office	United Socialist Workers' Party (PSTU)	Vera Rosane	None	16	

=== Withdrawn candidates ===
- Ranolfo Vieira Júnior (PSDB) - Former Vice Governor of Rio Grande do Sul 2019–2022 and Governor of Rio Grande do Sul (2022– present). With the return of Eduardo Leite in the race for the government of the State of Rio Grande do Sul, Ranolfo gives up on his candidacy for the state government in an agreement with the former governor.
- Alceu Moreira (MDB) - Federal Deputy from Rio Grande do Sul (2011 – present) and State president of Brazilian Democratic Movement in Rio Grande do Sul. He announced on March 23, 2022, that he was giving up on his candidacy. In an open letter, Moreira makes indirect but clear criticisms of party colleague Gabriel Souza and the former governor Eduardo Leite (PSDB). The federal deputy's anger comes from an alleged interference by the governor, which would have influenced Souza's decision to run for the MDB's internal primaries.
- Gabriel Souza (MDB) - State Deputy for Rio Grande do Sul (2015 – present) withdrew his candidacy to run as the vice-governor in Eduardo Leite's coalition, after beating Moreira in the party primaries.
- Romildo Bolzan Júnior (PDT) - Mayor of Osório, Rio Grande do Sul for two periods: 1993–1997 and 2005–2013. President of Grêmio Foot-Ball Porto Alegrense since 2015. Bolzan confirmed on 12 May 2022 that he will remain in charge of the club until the end of the year, when his term ends. That said, he officially withdrew from being a candidate for the state government. He says he will fulfill the mission he has with the football team and that's the reason why he could not accept the invitation of the Democratic Labour Party (PDT).
- Beto Albuquerque (PSB) - State deputy of Rio Grande do Sul (1991–1999) and Federal deputy from Rio Grande do Sul (1999–2015). Albuquerque announced on the afternoon of July 28, 2022, during a meeting of the Brazilian Socialist Party national executive in Brasília, that he wouldn't be a candidate for the government of Rio Grande do Sul. He stated, however, that he won't support a Workers' Party candidacy.
- Pedro Ruas (PSOL) - State deputy of Rio Grande do Sul (2015–2019) and councillor of Porto Alegre (1993–2015, 2021 – present). He announced his withdrawal on July 29 to run as the running mate on Edegar Pretto's ticket.
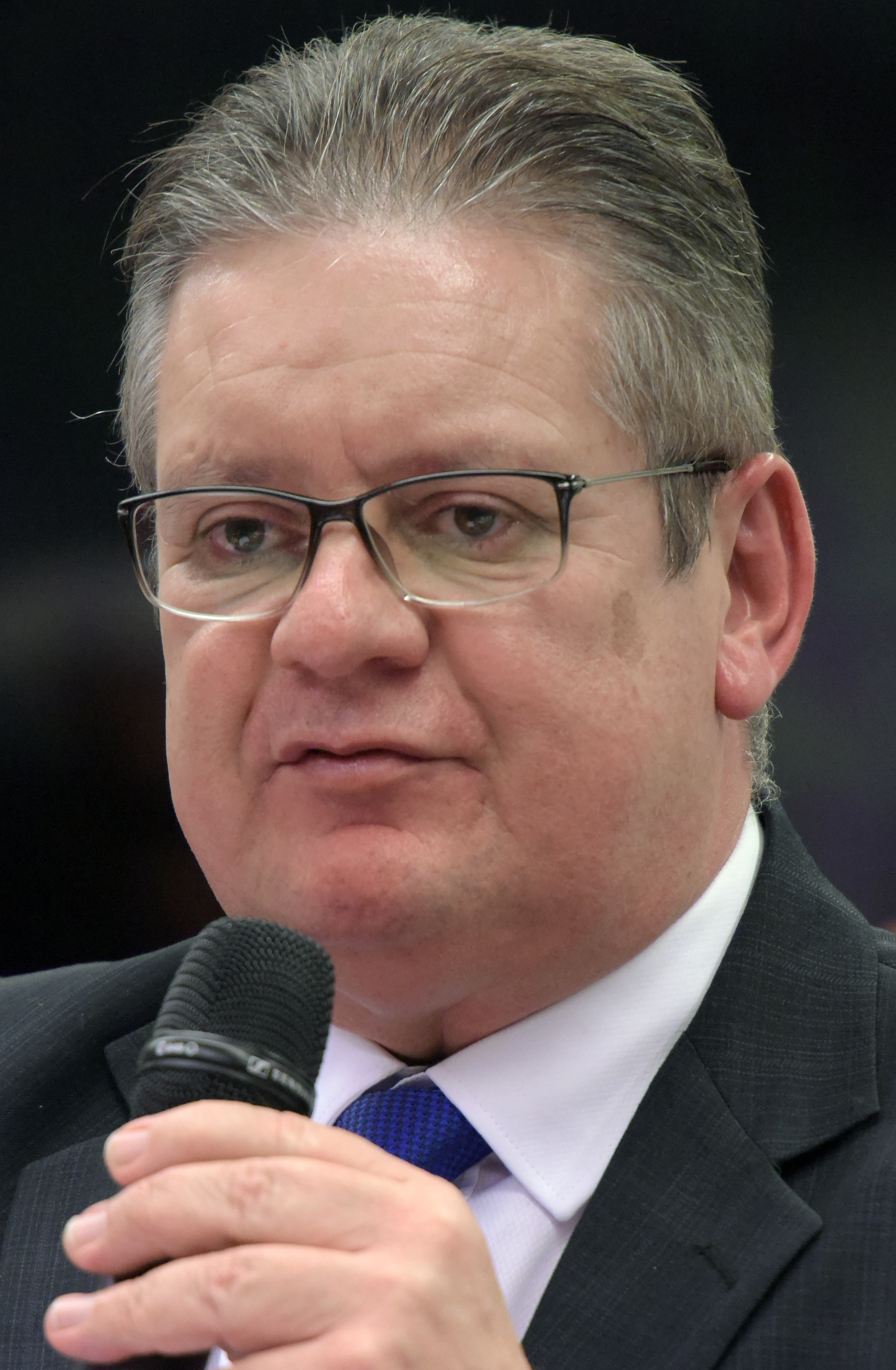
Governor of Rio Grande do Sul
Ranolfo Vieira Júnior (PSDB)
(2022 – present)

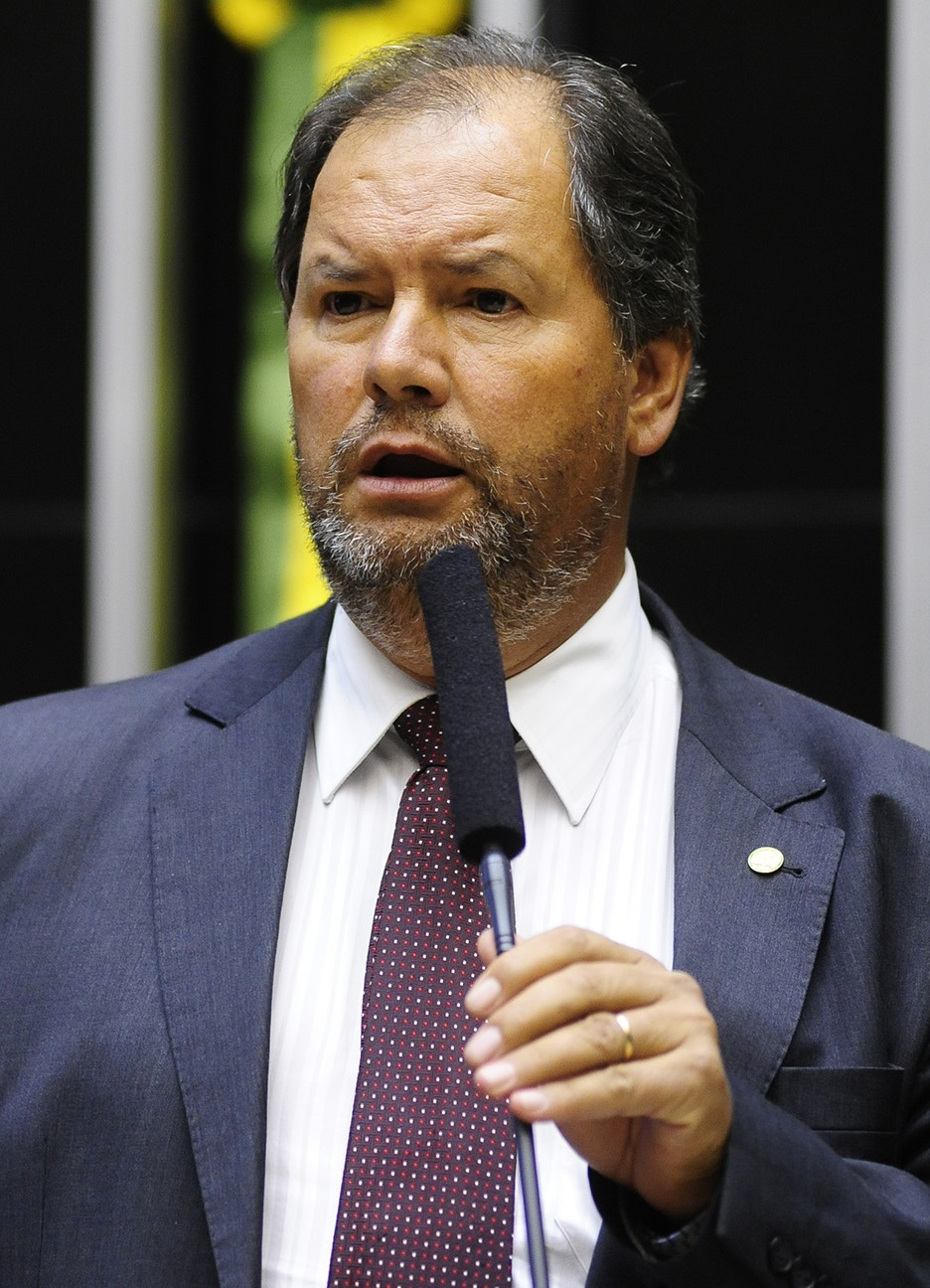
Federal Deputy from Rio Grande do Sul
Alceu Moreira (MDB)
(2011 – present)

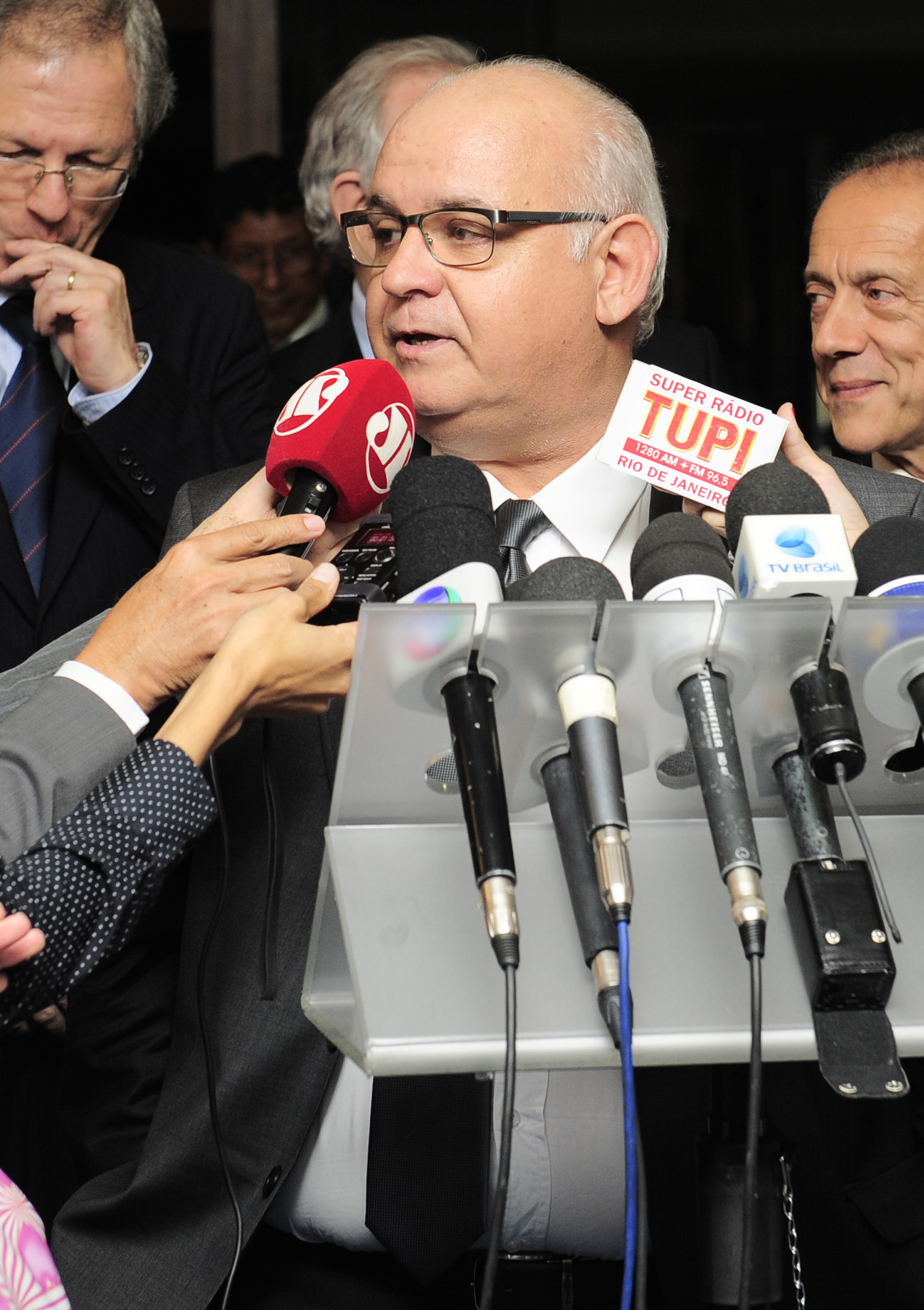
Mayor of Osório
Romildo Bolzan Júnior
(PDT)
(2005–2013)

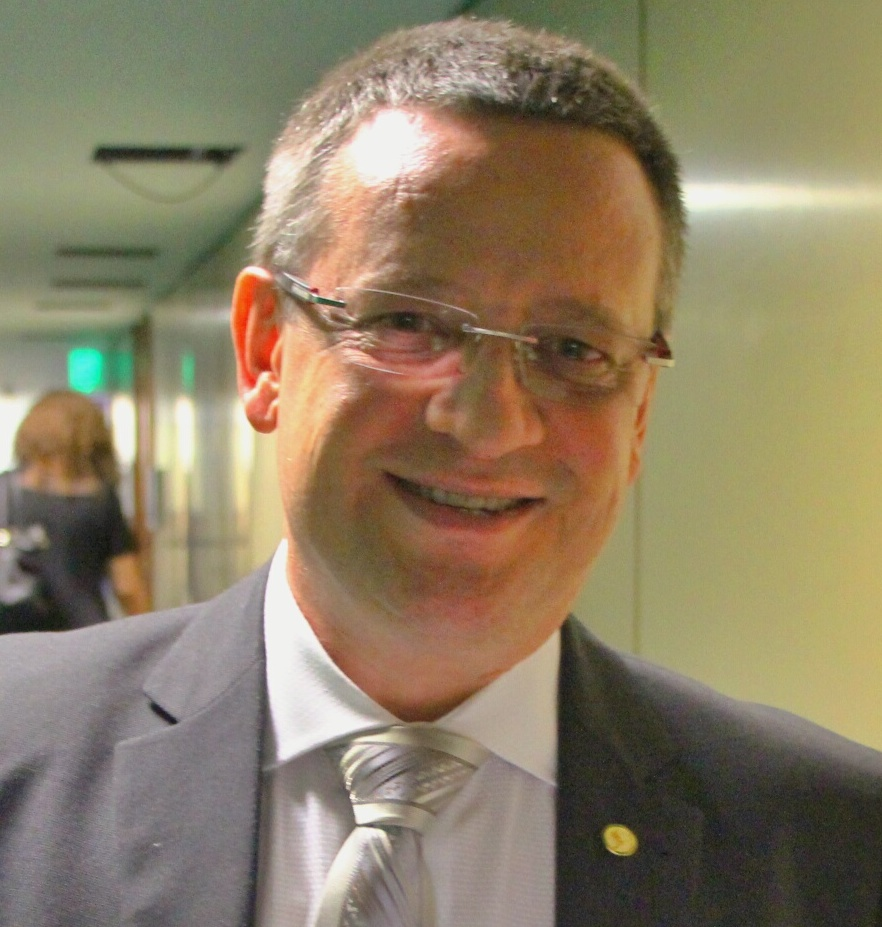
Federal deputy from Rio Grande do Sul
Beto Albuquerque
(PSB)
(1999–2015)

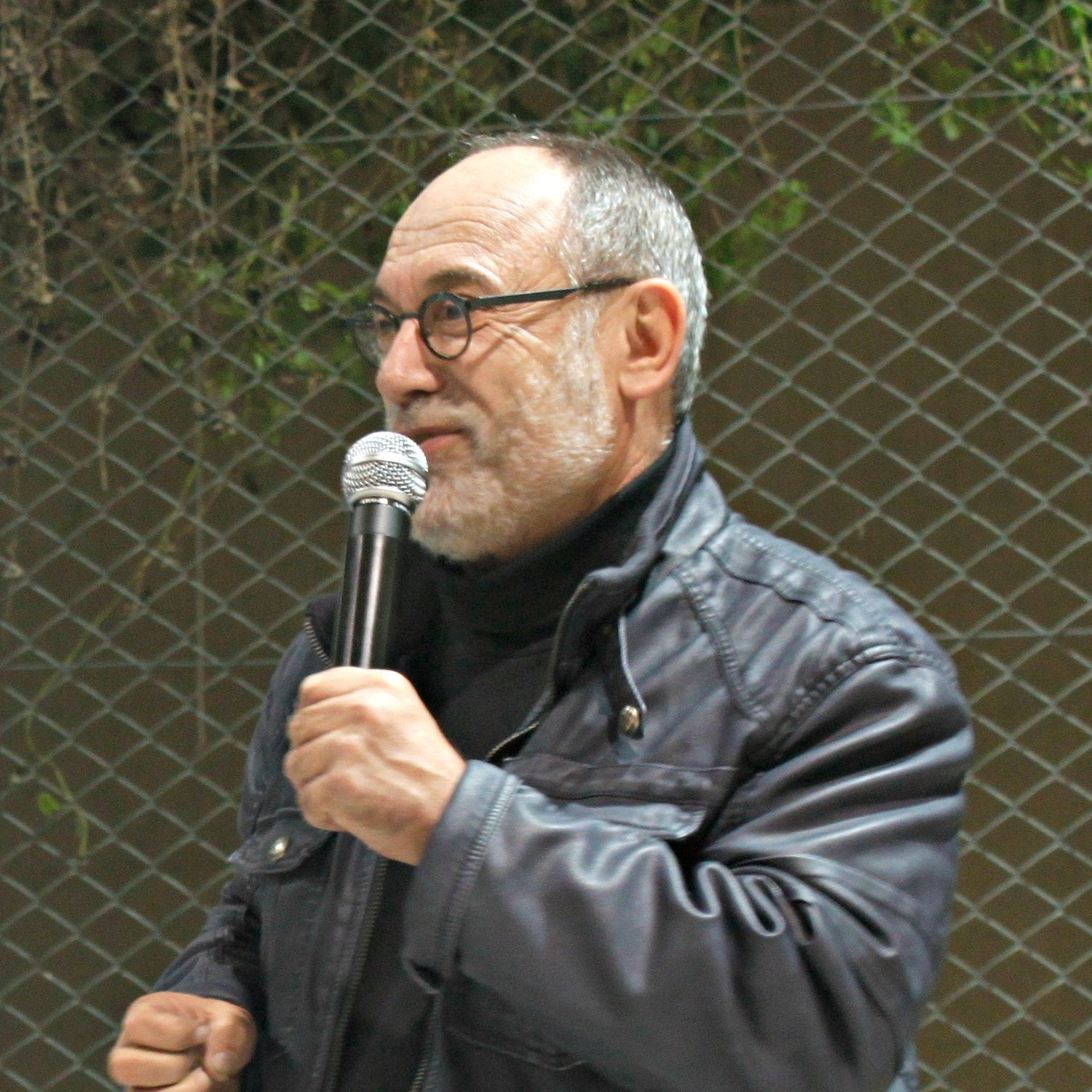
Councillor of Porto Alegre
Pedro Ruas
(PSOL)
(2021 – present)

== Senatorial candidates ==
The party conventions began on July 20 and will continue until August 5. The following political parties have already confirmed their candidacies. Political parties have until August 15, 2022, to formally register their candidates.

=== Confirmed candidates ===
Party	Candidate	Most relevant political office or occupation	Party	Candidates for Alternate Senators	Coalition	Electoral number	Ref.
Workers' Party (PT)	Olívio Dutra	Governor of Rio Grande do Sul (1999–2003)	Socialism and Liberty Party (PSOL)	1st alternate senator: Roberto Robaina	Brazil of Hope (PT, PCdoB and PV); PSOL REDE Federation (PSOL and REDE)	TBA	
Workers' Party (PT)	Olívio Dutra	Governor of Rio Grande do Sul (1999–2003)	TBA	TBA	Brazil of Hope (PT, PCdoB and PV); PSOL REDE Federation (PSOL and REDE)	TBA	
Republicans	Hamilton Mourão	Vice President of Brazil (2019 – present)	TBA	TBA	To defend and transform Rio Grande: Liberal Party (PL); Republicans; Republican Party of the Social Order (PROS); Patriota	100	
Progressistas (PP)	Comandante Nádia	Councillor of Porto Alegre (2017 – present)	TBA	TBA	Work and progress: Progressistas (PP); Brazilian Labour Party (PTB)	111	

=== Potential candidates ===
Party	Candidate	Most relevant political office or occupation	Party	Candidates for Alternate Senators	Coalition	Electoral number	Ref.
Podemos (PODE)	Lasier Martins	Senator for Rio Grande do Sul (2015 – present)	TBA	TBA	TBA	TBA	
Social Democratic Party (PSD)	Ana Amélia Lemos	Extraordinary Secretary of Federative and International Relations of Rio Grande do Sul (2019–2022)	TBA	TBA	TBA	TBA	
Brazilian Socialist Party (PSB)	Vicente Bogo	Vice Governor of Rio Grande do Sul (1995–1999)	TBA	TBA	TBA	TBA	
United Socialist Workers' Party (PSTU)	Fabiana Sanguiné	No prior public office	TBA	TBA	TBA	TBA	

=== Withdrawn candidates ===
- Manuela d'Ávila (PCdoB) - State Deputy of Rio Grande do Sul (2015–2019); Federal Deputy from Rio Grande do Sul (2007–2015); City Councillor of Porto Alegre (2005–2017) and running mate of Fernando Haddad in 2018 Brazilian presidential election. She reported to the Workers' Party (PT) that she gave up from running for a Senate seat in Rio Grande do Sul. In the message, she claimed to be a victim of political violence and said she feared for the safety of her family, which, according to her, has been a target of threats and persecution by Bolsonaro's supporters.
- Nelson Marchezan Júnior (PSDB) - Mayor of Porto Alegre (2017–2021); Federal Deputy from Rio Grande do Sul (2011–2017) and State Deputy of Rio Grande do Sul (2007–2011). The former mayor of Porto Alegre says he doesn't intend to run again for any public office because he was disappointed and that he was willing to abandon public life because he understands that opponents and former allies "played dirty" in the 2020 Porto Alegre mayoral election.
- José Ivo Sartori (MDB) - Governor of Rio Grande do Sul (2015–2019); Mayor of Caxias do Sul (2005–2013); Federal Deputy from Rio Grande do Sul (2003–2005) and State Deputy of Rio Grande do Sul (1983–2003). The former governor didn't present himself as a candidate for the Federal Senate in the party's public notice.
- Roberto Robaina (PSOL) - Councillor of Porto Alegre (2017 – present). Robaina was nominated as the first candidate for Alternate Senator on Olívio Dutra's ticket, who announced his intention to run for the Senate leading a collective term. If elected, Dutra and the alternates will share the term.
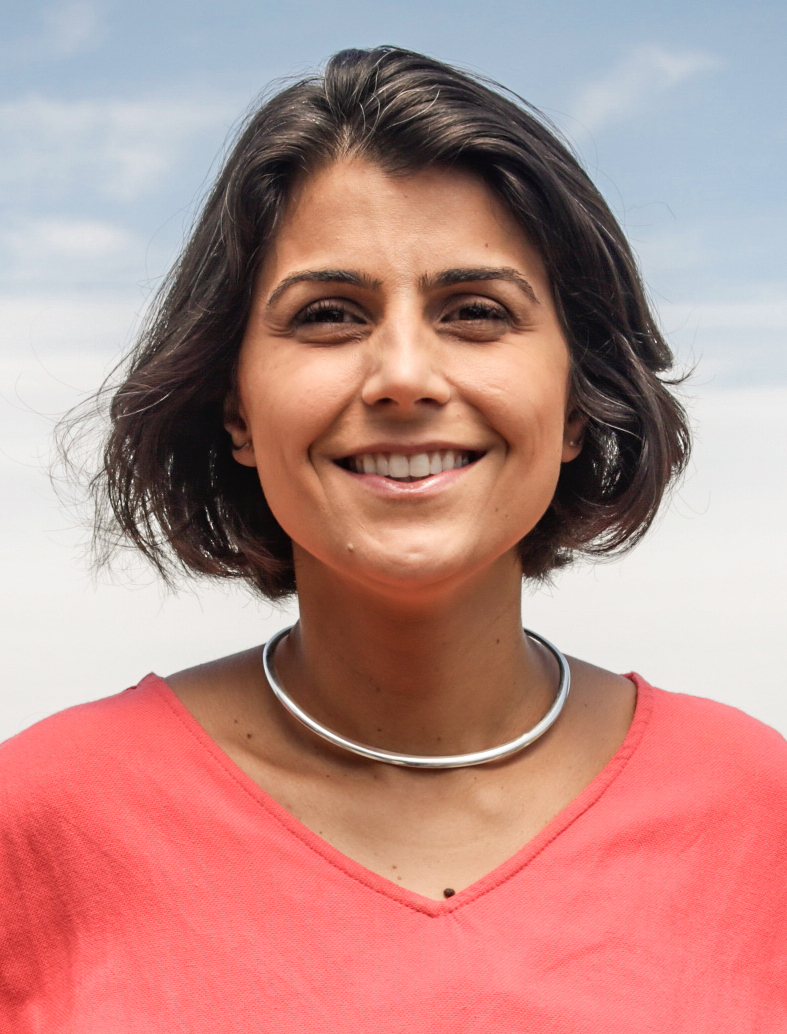
State Deputy of Rio Grande do Sul
Manuela d'Ávila (PCdoB)
(2015–2019)

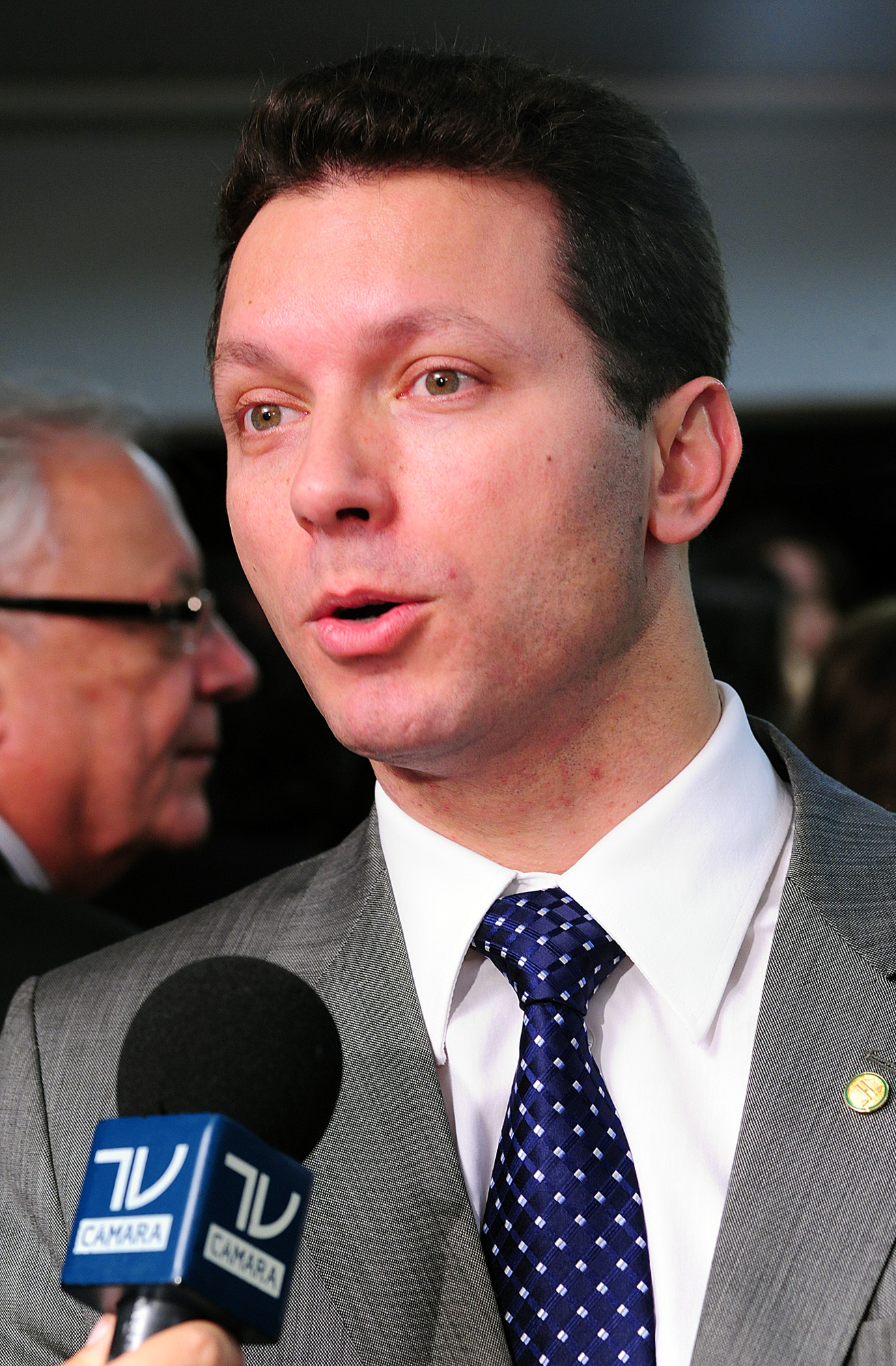
Mayor of Porto Alegre
Nelson Marchezan Júnior (PSDB)
(2017–2021)

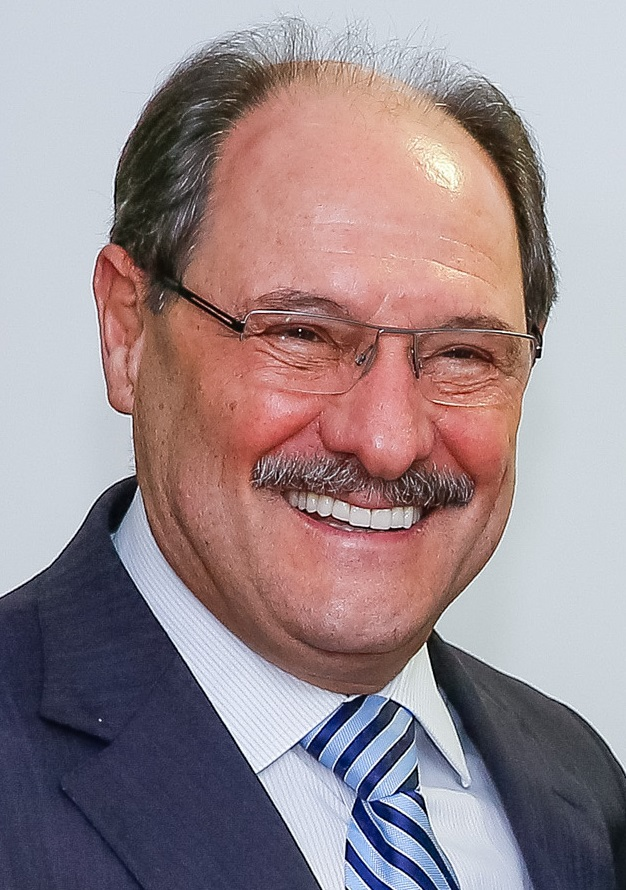
Governor of Rio Grande do Sul
José Ivo Sartori
(MDB)
(2015–2019)

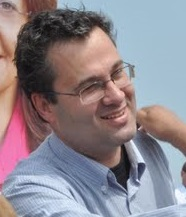
Councillor of Porto Alegre
Roberto Robaina
(PSOL)
(2017 – present)

== Legislative Assembly ==
The result of the last state election and the current situation in the Legislative Assembly of Rio Grande do Sul is given below:

Affiliation	Members		+/–
Affiliation	Elected	Current	+/–
PT	8	9	▲1
MDB	8	8	Steady
PP	6	7	▲1
PSDB	4	6	▲2
PL	2	5	▲3
Republicanos	2	4	▲2
PDT	4	4	Steady
UNIÃO	New	3	▲3
NOVO	2	2	Steady
PSB	3	2	▼1
PSOL	1	1	Steady
PSD	1	1	Steady
Cidadania	1	1	Steady
PODE	1	1	Steady
PTB	5	1	▼4
Solidarity	1	0	▼1
DEM	2	0	▼2
PSL	4	0	▼4
Total	55		–

== Opinion polls ==
=== First round ===
The first round is scheduled to take place on 2 October 2022.

Pollster/client(s)	Date(s) conducted	Sample size	Leite PSDB	Lorenzoni PL	Pretto PT	Heinze PP	Argenta PSC	Vieira PDT	Jobim NOVO	Rejane PSTU	Others	Abst. Undec.	Lead
28–29 July 2022	Pedro Ruas and Beto Albuquerque withdrew their respective candidacies.												
Pollster/client(s)	Date(s) conducted	Sample size	Leite PSDB	Lorenzoni PL	Pretto PT	Ruas PSOL	Heinze PP	Beto PSB	Argenta PSC	Souza MDB	Others	Abst. Undec.	Lead
Real Time Big Data	26–27 Jul 2022	1.500	29%	24%	9%	5%	4%	3%	1%	1%	4% (Note: Vieira da Cunha (PDT) with 2%, Ricardo Jobim (NOVO) with 1% and Rejane Oliveira (PSTU) with 1%)	20%	5%
Paraná Pesquisas	27 Jun–1 Jul 2022	1.540	29,5%	22,1%	5,3%	2,5%	6,6%	7,6%	1,2%	2,1%	2,2% (Note: Vieira da Cunha (PDT) with 2,2%)	21%	7,4%
EXAME/IDEIA	10–15 Jun 2022	1.000	20%	25%	11%	5%	7%	11%	2%	–	–	20%	5%
EXAME/IDEIA	10–15 Jun 2022	1.000	–	25%	8%	5%	7%	10%	1%	3%	13,6% (Note: Ranolfo Vieira Júnior (PSDB) with 10%; Vieira da Cunha (PDT) with 3%; Ricardo Jobim (NOVO) with 0,4% and Marco Della Nina (Patriota) with 0,2%)	27%	11,6%
EXAME/IDEIA	10–15 Jun 2022	1.000	23%	30%	–	–	–	–	2%	–	30% (Note: Manuela d'Ávila (PCdoB) with 24% and Vieira da Cunha (PDT) with 6%)	15%	Tie
13 Jun 2022	The former governor Eduardo Leite announces his candidacy for the government of Rio Grande do Sul.												
Pollster/client(s)	Date(s) conducted	Sample size	Leite PSDB	Lorenzoni PL	Pretto PT	Ruas PSOL	Heinze PP	Beto PSB	Ranolfo PSDB	Souza MDB	Others	Abst. Undec.	Lead
Real Time Big Data	23–24 May 2022	1.500	–	23%	7%	6%	6%	6%	7%	2%	4% (Note: Vieira da Cunha (PDT) with 3% and Roberto Argenta (PSC) with 1%)	39%	16%
Real Time Big Data	23–24 May 2022	1.500	23%	20%	6%	4%	4%	5%	–	1%	3% (Note: Vieira da Cunha (PDT) with 2% and Roberto Argenta (PSC) with 1%)	34%	3%
Real Time Big Data	23–24 May 2022	1.500	–	27%	8%	7%	–	–	6%	2%	5% (Note: Vieira da Cunha (PDT) with 3% and Roberto Argenta (PSC) with 2%)	45%	19%
Paraná Pesquisas	15–20 May 2022	1.540	–	21,9%	4,3%	4,9%	7,8%	12,3%	5,9%	1,6%	7,1% (Note: Romildo Bolzan Júnior (PDT) with 4,7%; Roberto Argenta (PSC) with 1,4% and Ricardo Jobim (NOVO) with 1%)	34,3%	9,6%
Paraná Pesquisas	15–20 May 2022	1.540	27,3%	19,2%	4%	3,8%	6,9%	9,5%	–	1,2%	5,1% (Note: Romildo Bolzan Júnior (PDT) with 3,3%; Roberto Argenta (PSC) with 1% and Ricardo Jobim (NOVO) with 0,8%)	23%	8,1%
Paraná Pesquisas	15–20 May 2022	1.540	–	23,2%	–	6,2%	8,1%	14%	6,6%	1,7%	1,6% (Note: Roberto Argenta (PSC) with 1,6%)	38,6%	9,2%
Real Time Big Data	15–16 Apr 2022	1.200	–	20%	5%	–	5%	7%	6%	2%	9% (Note: Romildo Bolzan Júnior (PDT) with 7% and Roberto Argenta (PSC) with 2%)	46%	11%
Real Time Big Data	15–16 Apr 2022	1.200	13%	19%	5%	–	5%	5%	–	1%	8% (Note: Romildo Bolzan Júnior (PDT) with 6% and Roberto Argenta (PSC) with 2%)	44%	6%
Real Time Big Data	15–16 Apr 2022	1.200	–	25%	16%	–	–	–	–	11%	11% (Note: Romildo Bolzan Júnior (PDT) with 11% - if Ciro Gomes (PDT) supports his candidacy)	37%	9%
Real Time Big Data	15–16 Apr 2022	1.200	–	–	–	–	23%	15%	–	11%	10% (Note: Romildo Bolzan Júnior (PDT) with 10% - if Ciro Gomes (PDT) supports his candidacy)	41%	8%
Real Time Big Data	15–16 Apr 2022	1.200	–	–	–	–	21%	16%	11%	–	10%	42%	5%
Real Time Big Data	15–16 Apr 2022	1.200	–	–	16%	–	22%	–	–	12%	10%	40%	6%
Real Time Big Data	15–16 Apr 2022	1.200	–	22%	–	–	–	16%	–	12%	10%	40%	6%
Real Time Big Data	15–16 Apr 2022	1.200	–	21%	–	–	–	14%	13%	–	10%	42%	7%
Real Time Big Data	15–16 Apr 2022	1.200	–	22%	15%	–	–	–	12%	–	10%	41%	7%
Real Time Big Data	15–16 Apr 2022	1.200	–	21%	15%	–	–	–	13%	–	10%	41%	6%
Instituto Amostra (FARSUL)	29 Mar–2 Apr 2022	1.500	–	18,5%	12,9%	–	6,2%	14,3%	4,4%	3,1%	8,4% (Note: Romildo Bolzan Júnior (PDT) with 8,4%)	32,3%	4,2%
Instituto Amostra (FARSUL)	29 Mar–2 Apr 2022	1.500	32,3%	14,5%	8,8%	–	5%	9,8%	–	2,7%	6,4% (Note: Romildo Bolzan Júnior (PDT) with 6,4%)	20,6%	17,8%
24 Mar 2022	Onyx Lorenzoni leaves Brazil Union and decides to join the Liberal Party.												
Pollster/client(s)	Date(s) conducted	Sample size	Leite PSDB	Lorenzoni DEM	Pretto PT	Ruas PSOL	Heinze PP	Beto PSB	Ranolfo PSDB	Sartori MDB	Others	Abst. Undec.	Lead
Real Time Big Data	13–14 Jan 2022	1.000	25%	13%	4%	4%	1%	1%	1%	16%	3% (Note: Gabriel Souza (MDB) with 2% and Roberto Argenta (Ind.) with 1%)	31%	9%
Real Time Big Data	13–14 Jan 2022	1.000	–	18%	4%	5%	2%	3%	2%	20%	4% (Note: Gabriel Souza (MDB) with 2% and Roberto Argenta (Ind.) with 2%)	41%	2%
Real Time Big Data	13–14 Jan 2022	1.000	–	16%	–	6%	–	4%	4%	23%	4% (Note: Roberto Argenta (Ind.) with 4%)	43%	7%
Real Time Big Data	13–14 Jan 2022	1.000	–	20%	4%	6%	–	5%	3%	–	2% (Note: Gabriel Souza (MDB) with 2%)	55%	14%
Real Time Big Data	13–14 Jan 2022	1.000	–	20%	4%	5%	4%	4%	4%	–	–	57%	15%
Real Time Big Data	13–14 Jan 2022	1.000	–	22%	4%	6%	5%	6%	–	–	2% (Note: Gabriel Souza (MDB) with 2%)	55%	16%
Instituto Atlas	17–23 Dec 2021	1.001	–	17,8%	18,6%	–	9,2%	7,8%	4,5%	–	–	38,6%	0,8%

=== Second round ===
The second round (if necessary) is scheduled to take place on 30 October 2022.

Lorenzoni vs. Beto

Pollster/client(s)	Date(s) conducted	Sample size	Lorenzoni PL	Beto PSB	Abst. Undec.	Lead
Paraná Pesquisas	27 Jun–1 Jul 2022	1.540	35,5%	31%	33,6%	4,5%
EXAME/IDEIA	10–15 Jun 2022	1.000	38%	29%	32%	9%

Lorenzoni vs. Leite

Pollster/client(s)	Date(s) conducted	Sample size	Lorenzoni PL	Leite PSDB	Abst. Undec.	Lead
Paraná Pesquisas	27 Jun–1 Jul 2022	1.540	34,9%	43,1%	22,1%	8,2%
EXAME/IDEIA	10–15 Jun 2022	1.000	36%	32%	32%	4%
24 Mar 2022	Onyx Lorenzoni leaves Brazil Union and decides to join the Liberal Party.					
Pollster/client(s)	Date(s) conducted	Sample size	Lorenzoni DEM	Leite PSDB	Abst. Undec.	Lead
Real Time Big Data	13–14 Jan 2022	1.000	29%	35%	36%	6%

Lorenzoni vs. Pretto

Pollster/client(s)	Date(s) conducted	Sample size	Lorenzoni PL	Pretto PT	Abst. Undec.	Lead
EXAME/IDEIA	10–15 Jun 2022	1.000	39%	24%	37%	15%

Lorenzoni vs. Manuela

Pollster/client(s)	Date(s) conducted	Sample size	Lorenzoni PL	Manuela PCdoB	Abst. Undec.	Lead
EXAME/IDEIA	10–15 Jun 2022	1.000	40%	30%	31%	10%

Leite vs. Manuela

Pollster/client(s)	Date(s) conducted	Sample size	Leite PSDB	Manuela PCdoB	Abst. Undec.	Lead
EXAME/IDEIA	10–15 Jun 2022	1.000	33%	26%	41%	7%

Leite vs. Pretto

Pollster/client(s)	Date(s) conducted	Sample size	Leite PSDB	Pretto PT	Abst. Undec.	Lead
EXAME/IDEIA	10–15 Jun 2022	1.000	29%	23%	48%	6%

Beto vs. Leite

Pollster/client(s)	Date(s) conducted	Sample size	Beto PSB	Leite PSDB	Abst. Undec.	Lead
Paraná Pesquisas	27 Jun–1 Jul 2022	1.540	28,7%	42,3%	29,1%	13,6%
EXAME/IDEIA	10–15 Jun 2022	1.000	31%	30%	39%	1%

Beto vs. Ranolfo

Pollster/client(s)	Date(s) conducted	Sample size	Beto PSB	Ranolfo PSDB	Abst. Undec.	Lead
Real Time Big Data	13–14 Jan 2022	1.000	24%	6%	70%	18%

Lorenzoni vs. Ranolfo

Pollster/client(s)	Date(s) conducted	Sample size	Lorenzoni DEM	Ranolfo PSDB	Abst. Undec.	Lead
Real Time Big Data	13–14 Jan 2022	1.000	34%	11%	55%	23%

=== Senator ===
Pollster/client(s)	Date(s) conducted	Sample size	Lemos PSD	Mourão Republicanos	Olívio PT	Martins PODE	Nádia PP	Vicente PSB	Sanguiné PSTU	Others	Abst. Undec.	Lead
25–29 July 2022	Olívio Dutra is announced as the Workers' Party candidate for the Federal Senate. José Ivo Sartori withdraws his candidacy for the Federal Senate.											
Pollster/client(s)	Date(s) conducted	Sample size	Lemos PSD	Mourão Republicanos	Rossetto PT	Martins PODE	Sartori MDB	Vicente PSB	Nádia PP	Others	Abst. Undec.	Lead
Real Time Big Data	26–27 Jul 2022	1.500	20%	24%	–	5%	3%	–	–	8% (Note: Nelson Marchezan Júnior (PSDB) with 7% and Roberto Robaina (PSOL) with 1%)	23%	4%
Paraná Pesquisas	27 Jun–1 Jul 2022	1.540	26,4%	23,4%	10,6%	8,7%	–	–	3,8%	4,8% (Note: Nelson Marchezan Júnior (PSDB) with 4,8%)	22,3%	3%
Paraná Pesquisas	27 Jun–1 Jul 2022	1.540	25,3%	23,4%	–	8,9%	–	–	3,9%	11,5% (Note: Beto Albuquerque (PSB) with 11,5%)	22,2%	1,9%
EXAME/IDEIA	10–15 Jun 2022	1.000	15%	19%	–	11%	–	0,1%	5%	22,1% (Note: Manuela d'Ávila (PCdoB) with 17%, Romildo Bolzan Júnior (PDT) with 5% and Nelson Marchezan Júnior (PSDB) with 0,1%)	31%	3,1%
27 May 2022	Manuela d'Ávila withdraws her candidacy for the Federal Senate.											
Pollster/client(s)	Date(s) conducted	Sample size	Manuela PCdoB	Mourão Republicanos	Lemos PSD	Martins PODE	Sartori MDB	Marchezan Júnior PSDB	Bolzan Júnior PDT	Others	Abst. Undec.	Lead
Real Time Big Data	23–24 May 2022	1.500	22%	22%	11%	6%	11%	5%	–	–	23%	Tie
Real Time Big Data	23–24 May 2022	1.500	20%	21%	9%	6%	10%	–	–	17% (Note: Eduardo Leite (PSDB) with 17%)	17%	1%
Paraná Pesquisas	15–20 May 2022	1.540	20,5%	22,7%	20,4%	7,5%	–	3,3%	–	2,7% (Note: Comandante Nádia (PP) with 2,7%)	23%	2,2%
Paraná Pesquisas	15–20 May 2022	1.540	18,4%	22%	17,9%	6,6%	–	–	–	17,4% (Note: Eduardo Leite (PSDB) with 14,9% and Comandante Nádia (PP) with 2,5%)	17,7%	3,6%
Paraná Pesquisas	15–20 May 2022	1.540	20,1%	22,3%	19,7%	7,7%	–	–	5,1%	2,8% (Note: Comandante Nádia (PP) with 2,8%)	22,3%	2,2%
Real Time Big Data	15–16 Apr 2022	1.200	20%	16%	12%	4%	10%	4%	4%	–	30%	4%
16 Mar 2022	Hamilton Mourão, Vice President of Brazil, leaves the Brazilian Labour Renewal Party and decides to join Republicans.											
Pollster/client(s)	Date(s) conducted	Sample size	Manuela PCdoB	Mourão PRTB	Lemos PP	Martins PODE	Sartori MDB	Pimenta PT	Moreira MDB	Others	Abst. Undec.	Lead
Real Time Big Data	13–14 Jan 2022	1.000	17%	14%	13%	10%	11%	4%	1%	–	30%	3%
Real Time Big Data	13–14 Jan 2022	1.000	17%	17%	14%	12%	–	6%	2%	–	32%	Tie

== Results ==
=== Governor ===
Candidate	Running mate	Party	First round		Second round	
Candidate	Running mate	Party	Votes	%	Votes	%
Eduardo Leite	Gabriel Souza (MDB)	PSDB	1,702,815	26.81	3,687,126	57.12
Onyx Lorenzoni	Cláudia Jardim	PL	2,382,026	37.50	2,767,786	42.88
Edegar Pretto	Pedro Ruas (PSOL)	PT	1,700,374	26.77		
Luis Carlos Heinze	Tanise Sabino	PP	271,540	4.28		
Roberto Argenta	Nivea Rosa (Solidariedade)	PSC	126,899	2.00		
Vieira da Cunha	Regina dos Santos	PDT	101,611	1.60		
Ricardo Jobim	Rafael Dresch	NOVO	38,887	0.61		
Vicente Bogo	Josiane Paz	PSB	17,222	0.27		
Rejane de Oliveira	Vera de Oliveira	PSTU	6,252	0.10		
Carlos Messalla	Edson Canabarro	PCB	4,003	0.06		
Total			6,351,629	100.00	6,454,912	100.00
Valid votes			6,351,629	92.28	6,454,912	93.22
Invalid votes			190,663	2.77	267,276	3.86
Blank votes			341,049	4.95	202,415	2.92
Total votes			6,883,341	100.00	6,924,603	100.00
Registered voters/turnout			8,582,100	80.21	8,582,100	80.69
PSDB hold						
Source: Superior Electoral Court

Popular vote (first round)
Lorenzoni	37.50%
Leite	26.81%
Pretto	26.77%
Others	8.92%

Popular vote (second round)
Leite	57.12%
Lorenzoni	42.88%

=== Senator ===
Candidate	Party	Votes	%
Hamilton Mourão	Republicanos	2,593,294	44.11
Olívio Dutra	PT	2,225,458	37.85
Ana Amélia Lemos	PSD	966,450	16.44
Ronaldo Teixeira	Avante	33,923	0.58
Sandra Figueiredo	PSB	31,613	0.54
Maristela Zanotto	PSC	17,292	0.29
Fabiana Sanguiné	PSTU	9,353	0.16
Paulo da Rosa	DC	2,077	0.04
Total		5,879,460	100.00
Valid votes		5,879,460	85.42
Invalid votes		476,754	6.93
Blank votes		527,127	7.66
Total votes		6,883,341	100.00
Registered voters/turnout		8,582,100	80.21
Republicanos gain from PODE			
Source: Superior Electoral Court

Popular vote
Mourão	44.11%
Dutra	37.85%
Lemos	16.44%
Others	1.61%

=== Chamber of Deputies ===
Party or alliance		Votes	%	Seats	+/–
Brazil of Hope	Workers' Party	1,040,725	16.92	6	▲1
Brazil of Hope	Communist Party of Brazil	109,274	1.78	1	▲1
Brazil of Hope	Green Party	18,129	0.29	0	Steady
Liberal Party		680,192	11.06	4	▲3
Brazilian Democratic Movement		586,325	9.53	3	▼1
Republicanos		549,530	8.94	3	▲2
Progressistas		522,295	8.49	3	▼1
Always Forward	Brazilian Social Democracy Party	352,544	5.73	2	Steady
Always Forward	Cidadania	128,451	2.09	1	▲1
Democratic Labour Party		321,317	5.22	2	▼1
Podemos		318,850	5.18	1	▲1
New Party		301,966	4.91	1	Steady
Social Democratic Party		295,357	4.80	1	Steady
PSOL REDE	Socialism and Liberty Party	295,262	4.80	1	Steady
PSOL REDE	Sustainability Network	7,918	0.13	0	Steady
Brazil Union		215,367	3.50	1	New
Brazilian Socialist Party		193,200	3.14	1	▼1
Brazilian Labour Party		89,766	1.46	0	▼2
Avante		39,776	0.65	0	Steady
Social Christian Party		29,346	0.48	0	Steady
Patriota		28,516	0.46	0	Steady
Solidariedade		12,595	0.20	0	Steady
Brazilian Communist Party		3,661	0.06	0	Steady
Brazilian Labour Renewal Party		2,656	0.04	0	Steady
Popular Unity		2,086	0.03	0	New
United Socialist Workers' Party		1,842	0.03	0	Steady
Republican Party of the Social Order		1,264	0.02	0	Steady
Christian Democracy		1,187	0.02	0	Steady
Agir		425	0.01	0	Steady
Workers' Cause Party		0	0.00	0	Steady
Total		6,149,822	100.00	31	–
Valid votes		6,149,822	89.34		
Invalid votes		211,614	3.07		
Blank votes		521,905	7.58		
Total votes		6,883,341	100.00		
Registered voters/turnout		8,582,100	80.21		

=== Legislative Assembly ===
Party or alliance		Votes	%	Seats	+/–
Brazil of Hope	Workers' Party	1,102,508	17.94	11	▲3
Brazil of Hope	Communist Party of Brazil	76,327	1.24	1	▲1
Brazil of Hope	Green Party	8,590	0.14	0	Steady
Progressistas		693,464	11.28	7	▼2
Brazilian Democratic Movement		629,558	10.24	6	▼2
Republicanos		546,106	8.88	5	▲3
Liberal Party		519,833	8.46	5	▲3
Democratic Labour Party		467,723	7.61	4	Steady
Always Forward	Brazilian Social Democracy Party	443,978	7.22	5	▲1
Always Forward	Cidadania	99,654	1.62	0	▼1
Brazil Union		305,406	4.97	3	New
PSOL REDE	Socialism and Liberty Party	286,076	4.65	2	▲1
PSOL REDE	Sustainability Network	2,763	0.04	0	Steady
Podemos		196,671	3.20	2	▲1
Social Democratic Party		181,035	2.95	1	Steady
Brazilian Socialist Party		151,163	2.46	1	▼2
New Party		147,221	2.40	1	▼1
Brazilian Labour Party		106,233	1.73	1	▼4
Social Christian Party		91,989	1.50	0	Steady
Avante		32,155	0.52	0	Steady
Solidariedade		29,106	0.47	0	▼1
Patriota		20,643	0.34	0	Steady
Brazilian Communist Party		3,833	0.06	0	Steady
Brazilian Labour Renewal Party		2,439	0.04	0	Steady
United Socialist Workers' Party		1,883	0.03	0	Steady
Christian Democracy		466	0.01	0	Steady
Agir		0	0.00	0	Steady
Workers' Cause Party		0	0.00	0	Steady
Total		6,146,823	100.00	55	–
Valid votes		6,155,799	89.43		
Invalid votes		209,568	3.04		
Blank votes		517,974	7.53		
Total votes		6,883,341	100.00		
Registered voters/turnout		8,582,100	80.21		
