= Dutra =

Dutra may refer to:

== Places ==
- Astolfo Dutra, a Brazilian municipality in the state of Minas Gerais
- Cidade Dutra (district of São Paulo), a district within the city of São Paulo
- Presidente Dutra, Maranhão, a Brazilian municipality in the state of Maranhão
- Presidente Dutra, Bahia, a Brazilian municipality in the state of Bahia
- Vicente Dutra, a Brazilian municipality in the state of Rio Grande do Sul

== Other uses ==
- Dutra (surname)
- Rodovia Presidente Dutra, known as Via Dutra, a federal highway in Brazil
- Dutra tractors, a Hungarian tractor brand produced between 1943 and 1972
