= Dutra (surname) =

Dutra (Portuguese pronunciation: [ˈdutɾɐ]) is a Portuguese language surname.

- Amalia Dutra (born 1958), Uruguayan scientist
- Antônio Monteiro Dutra (born 1973), Brazilian football player
- Diana Dutra (born 1964), Canadian boxer
- Eurico Gaspar Dutra (1883–1974), Brazilian marshal, politician, and president
- Janaína Dutra (1960-2004), Brazilian lawyer and activist
- José Dutra dos Santos (born 1948), Brazilian football player and manager
- Luis Dutra Jr., Brazilian mixed martial artist
- Olin Dutra (1901–1983), golfer
- Olívio Dutra (born 1941), Brazilian politician
- Otávio Dutra (born 1983), Brazilian-born Indonesian football player
- Randal M. Dutra III, visual effects artist
- Rogério Dutra da Silva (born 1984), Brazilian tennis player
- Sérgio Dutra Santos (born 1975), Brazilian volleyball player
- Tiago Dutra (born 1990), Brazilian football player
- Tom Dutra (born 1972), American soccer player and coach

== See also ==
- Dutra (disambiguation)
