= Presidente Dutra =

Presidente Dutra may refer to the following places in Brazil:

- Presidente Dutra, Bahia
- Presidente Dutra, Maranhão
