= 2014 Rio Grande do Sul gubernatorial election =

Rio Grande do Sul: Gubernatorial Election (2014, Brazil)

- October 5, 2014
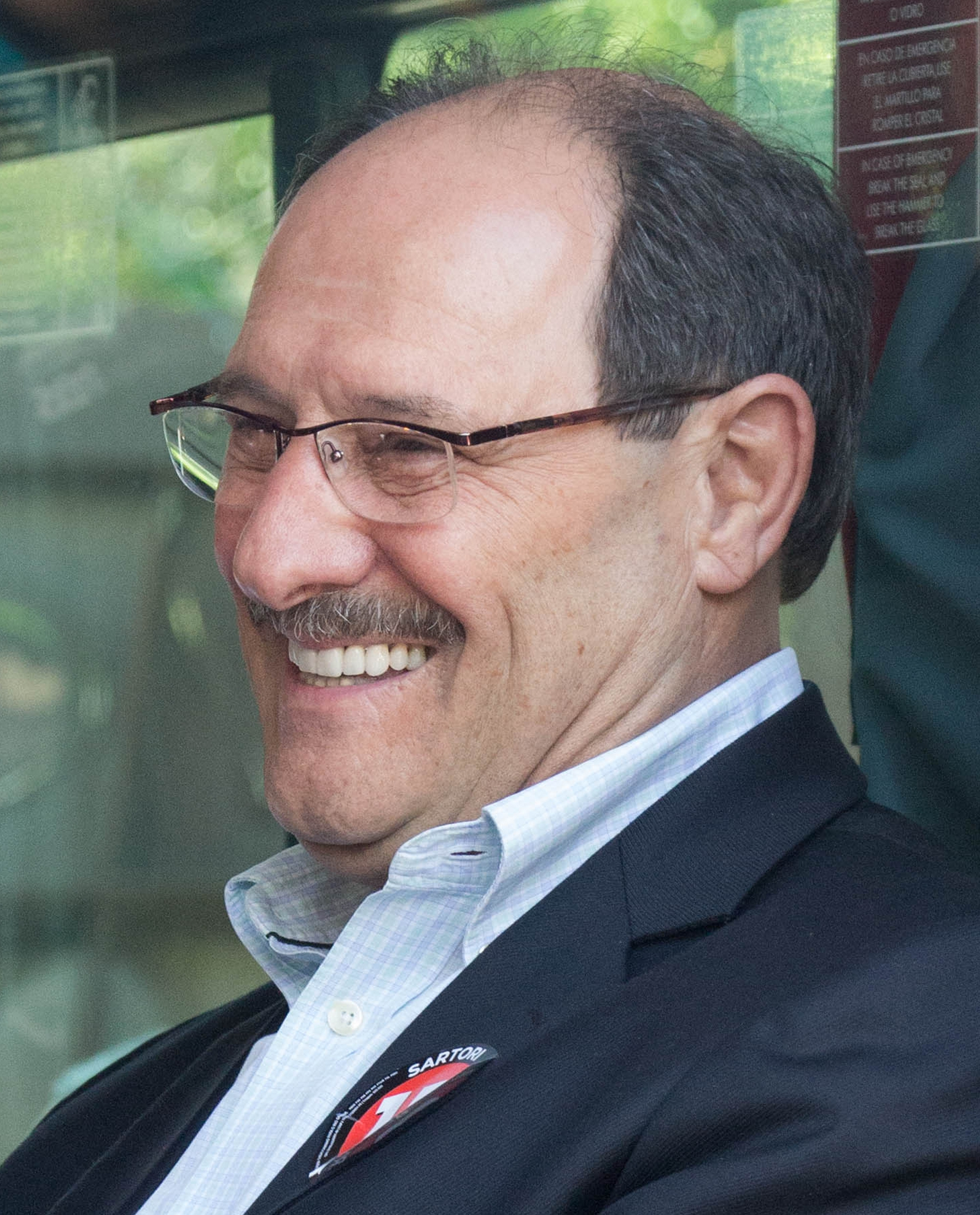

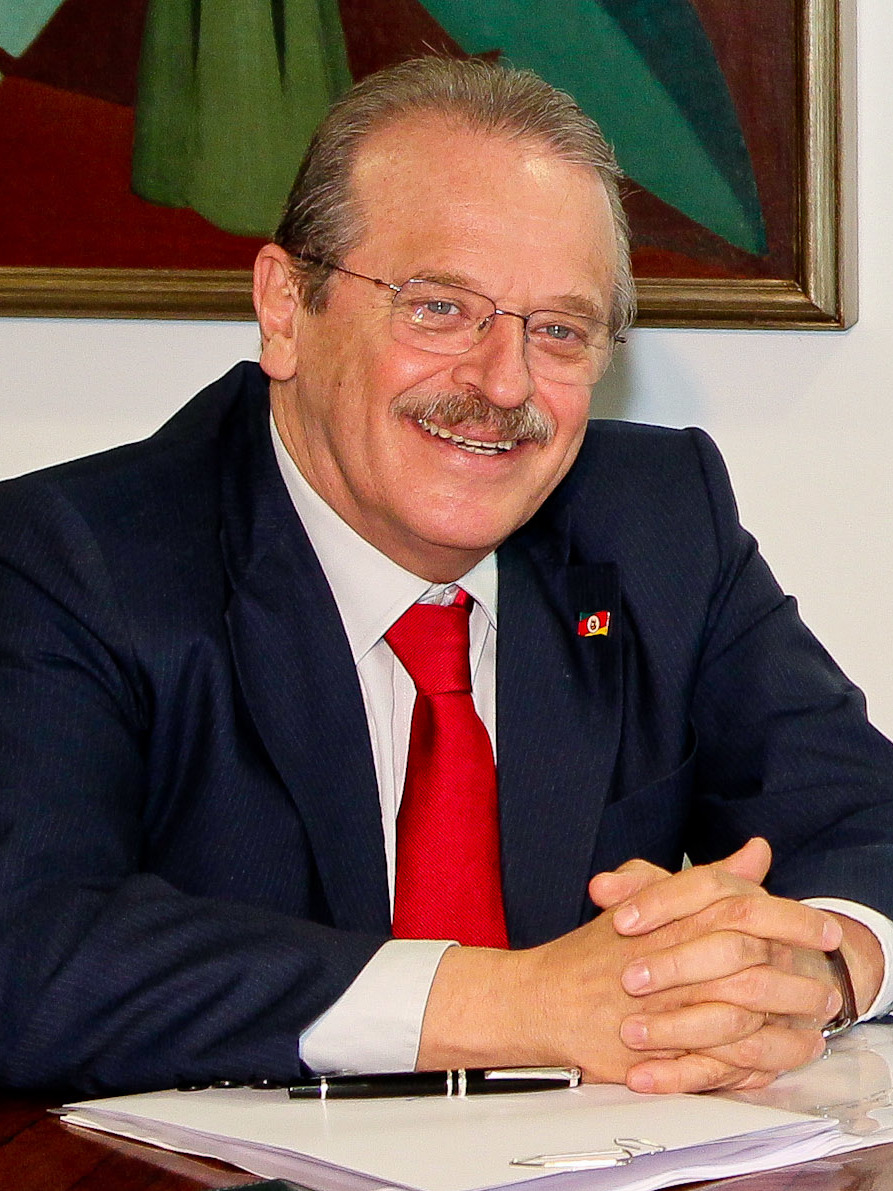
Nominee	José Ivo Sartori	Tarso Genro
Party	MDB	PT
Running mate	José Paulo Cairolli	Abigail Pereira
Popular vote	3,859,611	2,445,664
Percentage	61.21%	38.79%
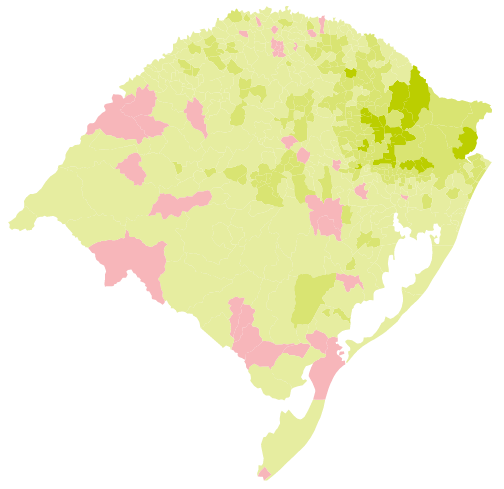
Governor before election
Tarso Genro
PT
Elected Governor
José Ivo Sartori
MDB

The Rio Grande do Sul gubernatorial election was held on 5 October 2014 to elect the next governor of the state of Rio Grande do Sul. Since no candidate received more than 50% of the vote in the first round, a second-round runoff election was held on 26 October.

Incumbent governor Tarso Genro was running for a second term, a distinction not achieved in recent history. His main challengers were Senator Ana Amélia Lemos of the Progressive Party and former Mayor of Caxias do Sul José Ivo Sartori of the Brazilian Democratic Movement Party.

Opinion polls leading up to the first round had shown Genro with a comfortable lead over his primary rival Lemos and Sartori steadily gaining support. Eventually, it was Sartori who defied opinion polls and ended comfortably in first place. Genro finished in second to advance to the runoff while Lemos finished in a distant third.

In the second round, Sartori defeated Genro with over 60% of the vote and was elected for a four-year term as governor.

== Candidates ==
=== Coalitions ===
Candidate	Running mate	Coalition
Ana Amélia Lemos; PP	Cassiá Carpes; SD	"The Hope that unites Rio Grande" (PP, SD, PSDB, PRB)
Vieira da Cunha; PDT	Flávio José Gomes; PSC	"Rio Grande Deserves More" (PDT, PSC, DEM, PV, PEN)
Tarso Genro; PT	Abigail Pereira; PCdoB	"Popular Unity at Rio Grande" (PT, PCdoB, PTB, PTC, PROS, PR, PPL)
José Ivo Sartori; PMDB	José Paulo Cairolli; PSD	"The New Way to Rio Grande" (PMDB, PSD, PPS, PSB, PSDC, PSL, PHS, PTdoB)
Humberto Carvalho; PCB	Nuberm Airton Cabral Medeiros; PCB	-
Edison Estivalete; PRTB	Hermes Aloísio; PRTB	-
Roberto Robaina; PSOL	Gabrielle Tolotti; PSOL	"Left Front" (PSOL, PSTU)

== Opinion Polling ==
Date	Institute	Candidate								Blank/Null/Undecided
Date	Institute	Tarso Genro (PT)	Ana Amélia Lemos (PP)	José Ivo Sartori (PMDB)	Vieira da Cunha (PDT)	Roberto Robaina (PSOL)	João Carlos Rodrigues (PMN)	Edison Estivalete (PRTB)	Humberto Carvalho (PCB)	Blank/Null/Undecided
September 25–26, 2014	Datafolha	31%	31%	17%	2%	1%	-			18%
September 21–23, 2014	Ibope	30%	37%	15%	1%	-				16%
September 17–18, 2014	Datafolha	27%	37%	13%	3%	-				19%
September 8–10, 2014	Methodus	27.7%	39.4%	11.8%	3.9%	1%	-			15.6%
September 8–9, 2014	Datafolha	28%	37%	11%	2%	1%	-			20%
September 7–9, 2014	Ibope	30%	38%	11%	2%	-				18%
September 5–6, 2014	Vox Populi	26%	36%	12%	3%	-				22%
September 2–3, 2014	Datafolha	31%	39%	10%	3%	-				17%
August 19–23, 2014	Methodus	31.2%	40.9%	5.8%	4.7%	2%	-	-		15.4%
August 12–14, 2014	Datafolha	30%	39%	7%	3%	1%		-		20%
August 8–13, 2014	Methodus	31%	42.4%	5.9%	4.1%	1.4%	-	0.1%	0.7%	14.3%
August 2–5, 2014	Ibope	35%	36%	5%	4%	1%	-	-	1%	24%
July 13–16, 2014	Ibope	31%	37%	4%	2%	1%	1%	0%		21%
March 27–31, 2014	Ibope	31%	38%	5%	3%	1%	-			21%
