= 2021 PSDB presidential primary =

Brazilian political primary

2021 PSDB presidential primaries
- 21 and 27 November 2021
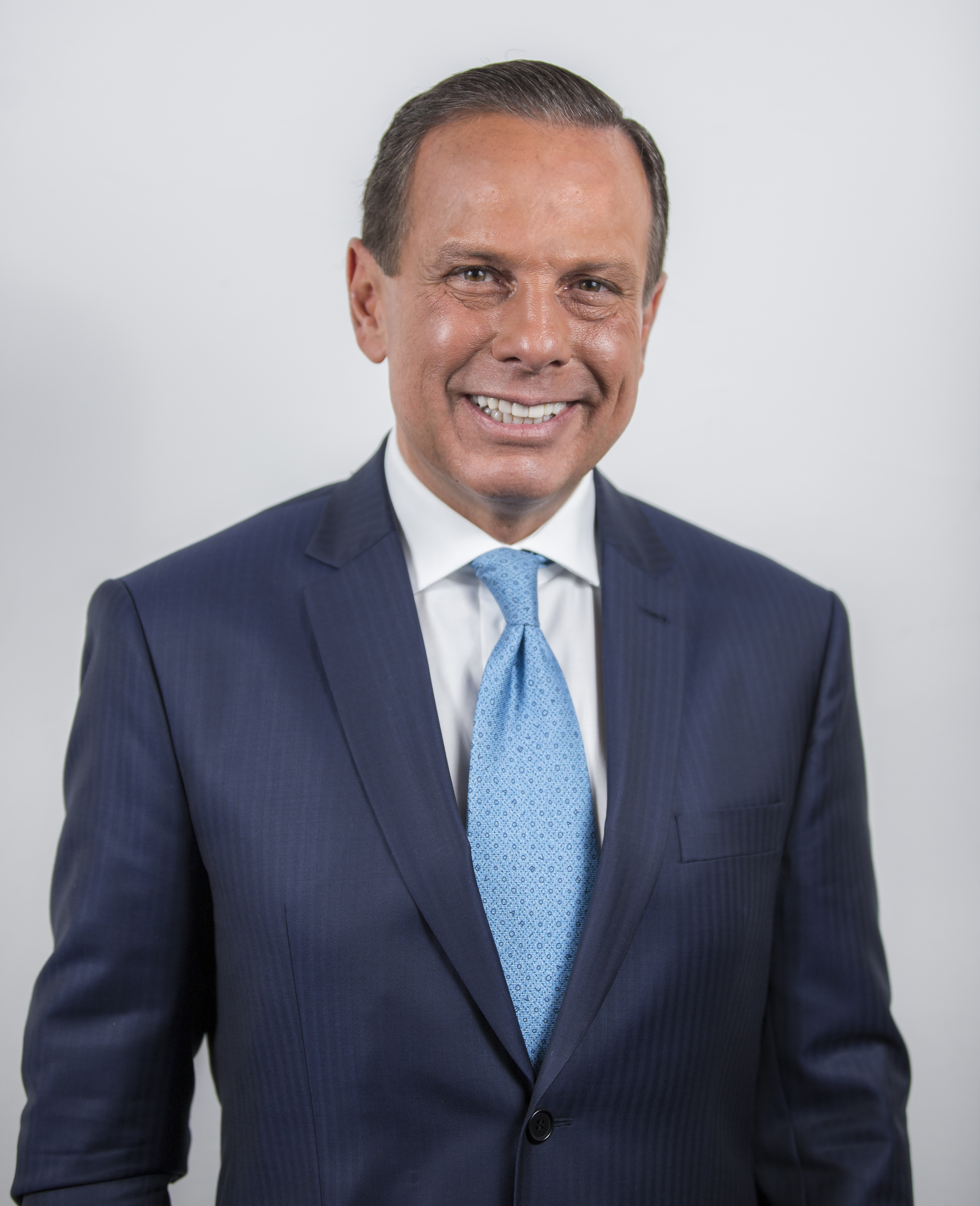

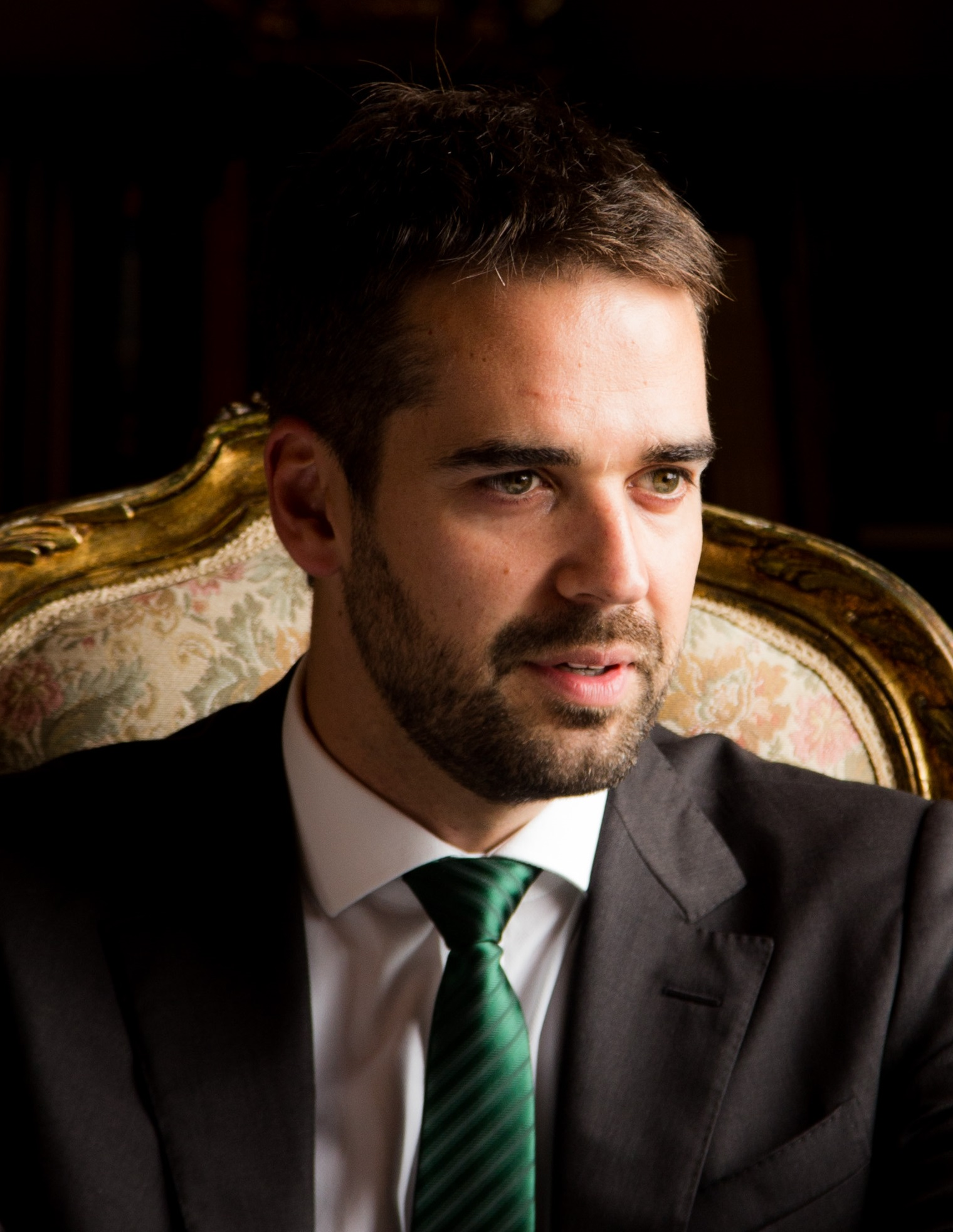

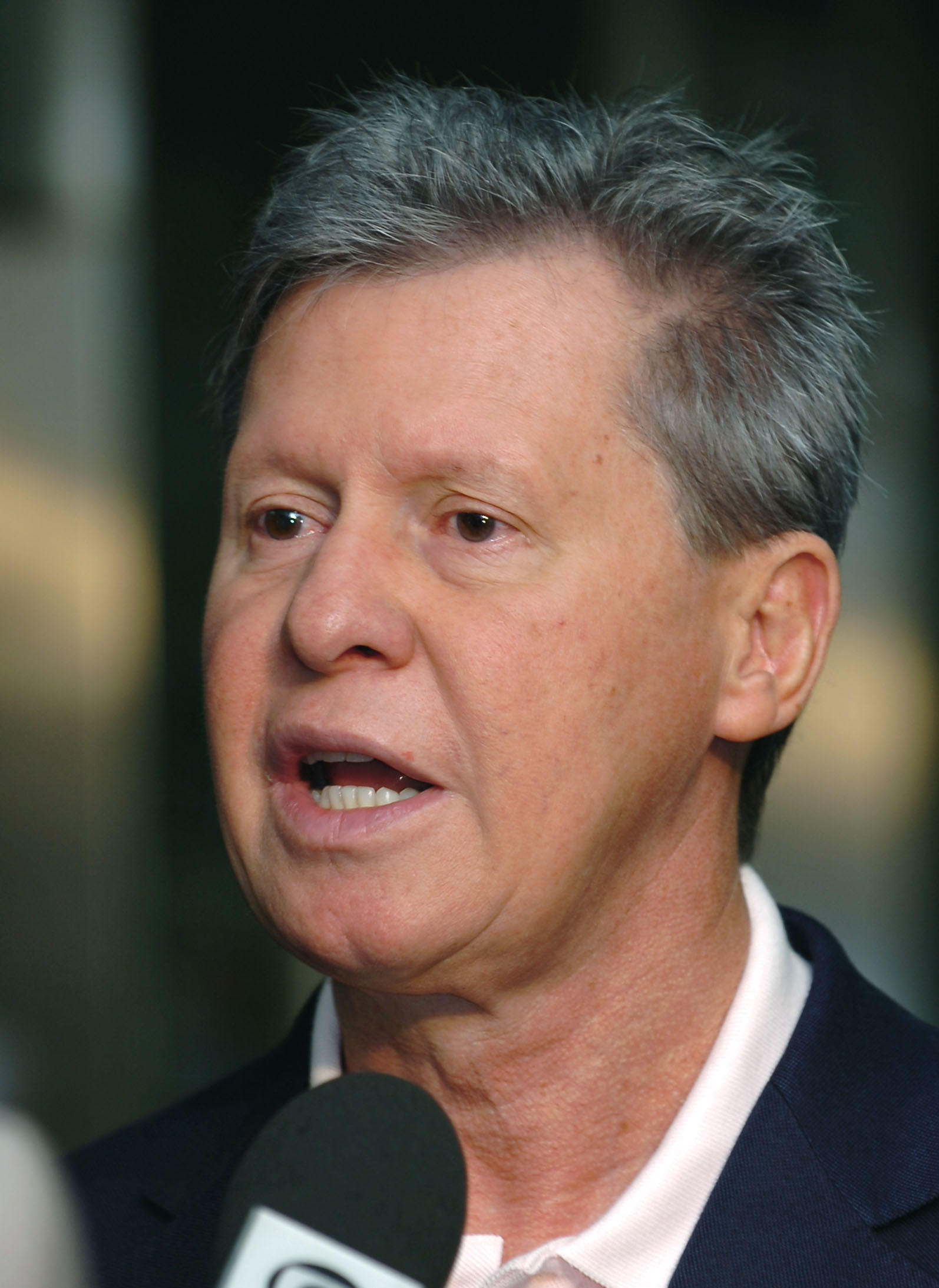
Candidate	João Doria	Eduardo Leite	Arthur Virgílio Neto
Home state	São Paulo	Rio Grande do Sul	Amazonas
Popular vote	17,470	11,295	427
Percentage	53.99%	44.66%	1.35%
Previous PSDB nominee
Geraldo Alckmin
PSDB nominee
João Doria

The 2021 PSDB presidential primary was held on 21 and 27 November 2021 to elect the Brazilian Social Democracy Party presidential nominee.

== Background ==
=== 2018 Brazilian general election ===
In 2018, PSDB choose Geraldo Alckmin as its presidential candidate and formed the alliance "To unite Brazil", composed of PSDB, DEM, PP, PR, PRB, Solidariedade, PTB, PSD and PPS. In 2018, PSDB had its worst presidential election result ever, getting only 5% of the votes and losing only half of their deputies. In the runoff, PSDB declared neutrality and elected 3 governors, their smallest amount since 1990.

=== Bolsonaro's Administration ===
In 2019, PSDB declared itself to be an independent party, criticizing the more authoritarian agenda of Bolsonaro but endorsing most of the economic agenda. They were important for the passing of the pension reform.

In 2020, Jair Bolsonaro nominated Rogério Marinho, a PSDB politician, as Minister of Regional Development. While PSDB was initially supportive of the nomination, Rogério Marinho later had to leave the party due to PSDB wanting to distance themselves from Bolsonaro.

During the COVID-19 pandemic in Brazil, PSDB became more overtly against Bolsonaro. João Doria, governor of São Paulo, and Eduardo Leite, governor of Rio Grande do Sul, ordered social distancing and lockdown. João Doria notoriously bought CoronaVac and São Paulo became the first state to start the vaccination.

In 2021, due to the democratic backsliding in Brazil, PSDB voted to become an opposition party and to open impeachment procedures against Bolsonaro. João Doria tried to be elected party president and become the presumptive PSDB candidate, but after criticism of power-grabbing, it was decided that PSDB would have a primary to elect its presidential candidate.

== Electoral system ==
For the 2021 presidential primary, PSDB decided to adopt a system where voters being part of different electoral colleges depending on their party position. There are 4 electoral colleges each with equal value:

1- Registered members without elected position;

2- Mayors and deputy mayors;

3- City councilors and state deputies;

4- Governors, Vice Governors, Senators, federal deputies and members of the National Executive;

If a candidate gets more than 50% of the votes in the first round, he wins, but if no candidate, there is a runoff election between the two most voted candidates.

Doria proposed a universal system that every registered member had equal vote, but the PSDB executive rejected the proposal.

== Candidates ==
PSDB primary candidates
Candidate	Born	Experience	State
João Doria	December 16, 1957 (age 63) São Paulo, São Paulo	Governor of São Paulo (2019-2022) Mayor of São Paulo (2017-2018) President of Embratur (1986-1988) Secretary of Tourism of São Paulo (1983-1986)	São Paulo
Eduardo Leite	March 10, 1985 (age 36) Pelotas, Rio Grande do Sul	Governor of Rio Grande do Sul (2019-present) Mayor of Pelotas (2013-2016) President of the City Council of Pelotas (2011-2013) City Councillor of Pelotas (2009-2013)	Rio Grande do Sul
Tasso Jereissati	December 15, 1948 (age 72) Fortaleza, Ceará	Senator from Ceará (2003-2011; 2015-2023) President of PSDB (1991-1994; 2005-2007) Governor of Ceará (1987-1991; 1995-2002)	Ceará
Arthur Virgílio Neto	November 15, 1945 (age 76) Manaus, Amazonas	Mayor of Manaus (1989-1993; 2013-2020) Senator from Amazonas (2003-2011) Secretary-General of the Presidency (2001-2002) Federal deputy from Amazonas (1983-1987; 1995-2003)	Amazonas

== Campaign ==
=== João Doria ===
João Doria announced his presidential campaign in June 15.

In the campaign declared support of the privatization of Petrobras and Banco do Brasil, but came out against the privatization of Caixa Econômica Federal. He said that, if he became the PSDB presidential nominee, he would select a woman as running mate.

=== Eduardo Leite ===
Eduardo Leite said that he would be a candidate in the PSDB primaries in May.

His main economic advisor is Aod Cunha, a former Rio Grande do Sul finance secretary, his main points are a plan to tackle inequality, free market reforms, fiscal responsibility and environment protection.

=== Tasso Jereissati ===
In April 25, Tasso announced his intention to join the PSDB presidential primary. On September 28, 2021, he withdrew from participating in the primaries and decided to publicly support Leite's name.

=== Arthur Virgílio Neto ===
Vírgilio was the first candidate to announce his intention to run in the PSDB presidential primary.

== Endorsements ==
João Doria

Former presidential candidates

- Fernando Henrique Cardoso, 34th President of Brazil (1995-2003).

Governors

- Yeda Crusius, 36th Governor of Rio Grande do Sul (2007-2011).
- Antônio Imbassahy, 45th Governor of Bahia (1994-1995).
- Helder Barbalho, 42th Governor of Pará (MDB member).

Vice Governors

- Rodrigo Garcia, 27th Vice Governor of São Paulo (2019-2022).

Senators

- Izalci Lucas, senator from Federal District (2019-present).

Organizations

- PSDB of São Paulo.
- PSDB of Pará.
- PSDB of Federal District.
- PSDB of Tocantins
- PSDB of Acre.
Eduardo Leite

Former presidential candidates

- Geraldo Alckmin, 2006 and 2018 PSDB presidential nominee.

Governors

- Reinaldo Azambuja, Governor of Mato Grosso do Sul (2015-present).
- Beto Richa, 55th Governor of Paraná (2011-2018).

Vice Governors

- Paulo Brant, 10th Vice Governor of Minas Gerais (2019-present).
- Ranolfo Vieira Júnior, 43rd Vice Governor of Rio Grande do Sul (2019-present).

Senators

- Rodrigo Cunha, senator from Alagoas.

Organizations

- PSDB of Minas Gerais.
- PSDB of Bahia.
- PSDB of Paraná.
- PSDB of Ceará
- PSDB of Rio Grande do Sul.
- PSDB of Alagoas.
- PSDB of Amapá.

== Results ==
2021 PSDB presidential primary results
Candidate	Group 1 - Registered members (weight 25%)	Group 2 - Mayors and deputy mayors (weight 25%)	Group 3.1 - City councilors (weight 12.5%)	Group 3.2 - State deputies (weight 12.5%)	Group 4 - Governors, vice governors, senators, federal deputies and members of the National Executive (weight 25%)	Total (%)
João Doria	15,646 (15.38%)	393 (12.89%)	1,367 (5.93%)	37 (6.80%)	27 (12.98%)	53.99%
Eduardo Leite	9,387 (9.23%)	363 (11.91%)	1,491 (6.47%)	30 (5.81%)	24 (11.54%)	44.66%
Arthur Virgílio Neto	395 (0.39%)	6 (0.20%)	24 (0.10%)	1 (0.18%)	1 (0.48%)	1.35%
