= Luis Carlos Heinze =

Brazilian politician

- Official portrait

Senator for Rio Grande do Sul
- Incumbent
- Assumed office 1 February 2019
- Preceded by: Ana Amélia Lemos

Federal Deputy for Rio Grande do Sul
- In office 1 February 1999 – 31 January 2019

Mayor of São Borja
- In office 1 January 1993 – 31 December 1996

Personal details
- Born: 14 September 1950 (age 76) Candelária, Rio Grande do Sul, Brazil
- Party: PP (1998–)
- Profession: Agronomic Engineer

Luis Carlos Heinze (born 14 September 1950) is a federal senator of Brazil representing his home state of Rio Grande do Sul. He was previously served in the Chamber of Deputies from 1999 to 2019 and was mayor of São Borja from 1993 to 1996.

== Personal life ==
Heinze was born to Darcy Volnier Heinze and Cecy Therezinha Seckler. Of German descent, he is married to Sandra Maria Batista Heinze. He is a member of the Evangelical Lutheran Church of Brazil.

== Political career ==
Heinze voted in favor of the impeachment motion of then-president Dilma Rousseff. Heinze voted for a similar corruption investigation into Rousseff's successor Michel Temer. He voted in favor of the 2017 Brazilian labor reforms.

Along with Paulo Paim, Heinze was elected to the federal senate from the state of Rio Grande do Sul in the 2018 Brazilian general election.

== Views ==
Heinze is known in Brazil for his strong advocacy of the right to bear arms, which has been a central theme in his election campaigns.

In a public hearing held in the municipality of Vicente Dutra in November 2013, Heinze said that "quilombolas, Indians, gays, lesbians" are "everything that is not good." In February 2014 these comments were published in the national newspapers, although Heinze stood by his words and said that he meant what he said. He also said that he supported forming a private militia.

On 7 December 2013 Heinze was the speaker at an event in Campo Grande about passing legislation making it legal to organize militia to protect settlements from native peoples. In his speech Heinze criticized Gilberto Carvalho, saying that his office was a "nest of Indians, blacks, landless people, gays, and lesbians". Heinze later claimed his comments were made in the heat of the moment. As a result of these comments the international indigenous rights NGO Survival International dubbed Heinze the "racist of the year."
