= Mateus Wesp =

Brazilian politician (born 1988)

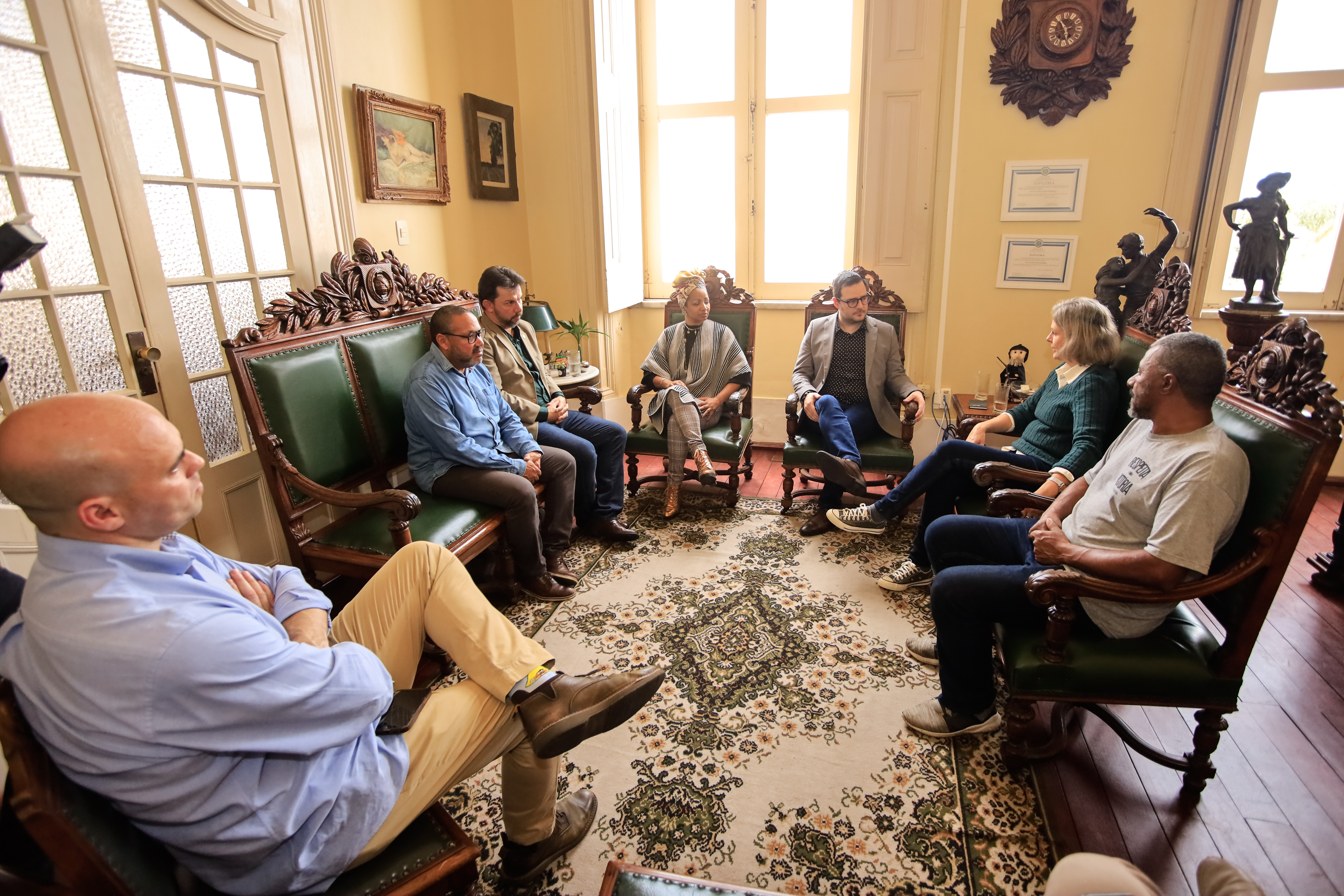
- Wesp in 2023

Secretary of Justice, Citizenship and Human Rights of Rio Grande do Sul
- In office 1 January 2023 – 7 November 2023
- Governor: Eduardo Leite
- Preceded by: Mauro Hauschild
- Succeeded by: Fabrício Peruchin

Personal details
- Born: 23 July 1988 (age 38)
- Party: Social Democratic Party (since 2025)

Mateus José de Lima Wesp (born 23 July 1988) is a Brazilian politician. From January to November 2023, he served as secretary of justice, citizenship and human rights of Rio Grande do Sul. From 2019 to 2022, he was a member of the Legislative Assembly of Rio Grande do Sul.
