= Gabriel Souza (politician) =

Brazilian politician (born 1984)

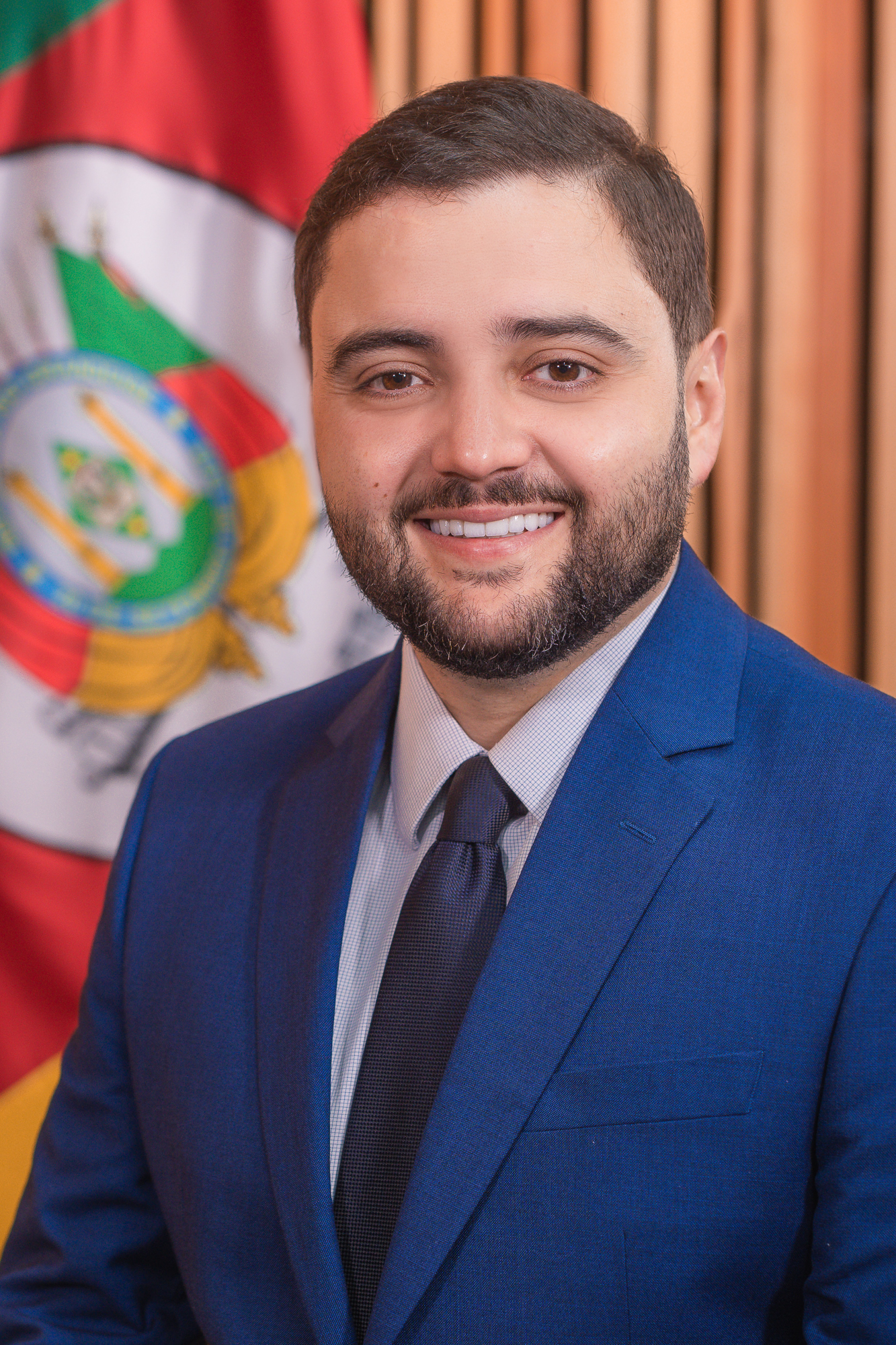
- Souza in 2023

Vice Governor of Rio Grande do Sul
- Incumbent
- Assumed office 1 January 2023
- Governor: Eduardo Leite
- Preceded by: Ranolfo Vieira Júnior

President of the Legislative Assembly of Rio Grande do Sul
- In office 1 February 2021 – 1 February 2022
- Preceded by: Ernani Polo
- Succeeded by: Valdeci Oliveira

Personal details
- Born: Gabriel Vieira de Souza; 2 January 1984 (age 42) Tramandaí, Rio Grande do Sul, Brazil
- Party: MDB (since 2000)

Gabriel Vieira de Souza (born 2 January 1984) is a Brazilian politician serving as vice governor of Rio Grande do Sul since 2023. From 2021 to 2022, he served as president of the Legislative Assembly of Rio Grande do Sul.
