= Giuseppe Riesgo =

Brazilian politician (born 1995)

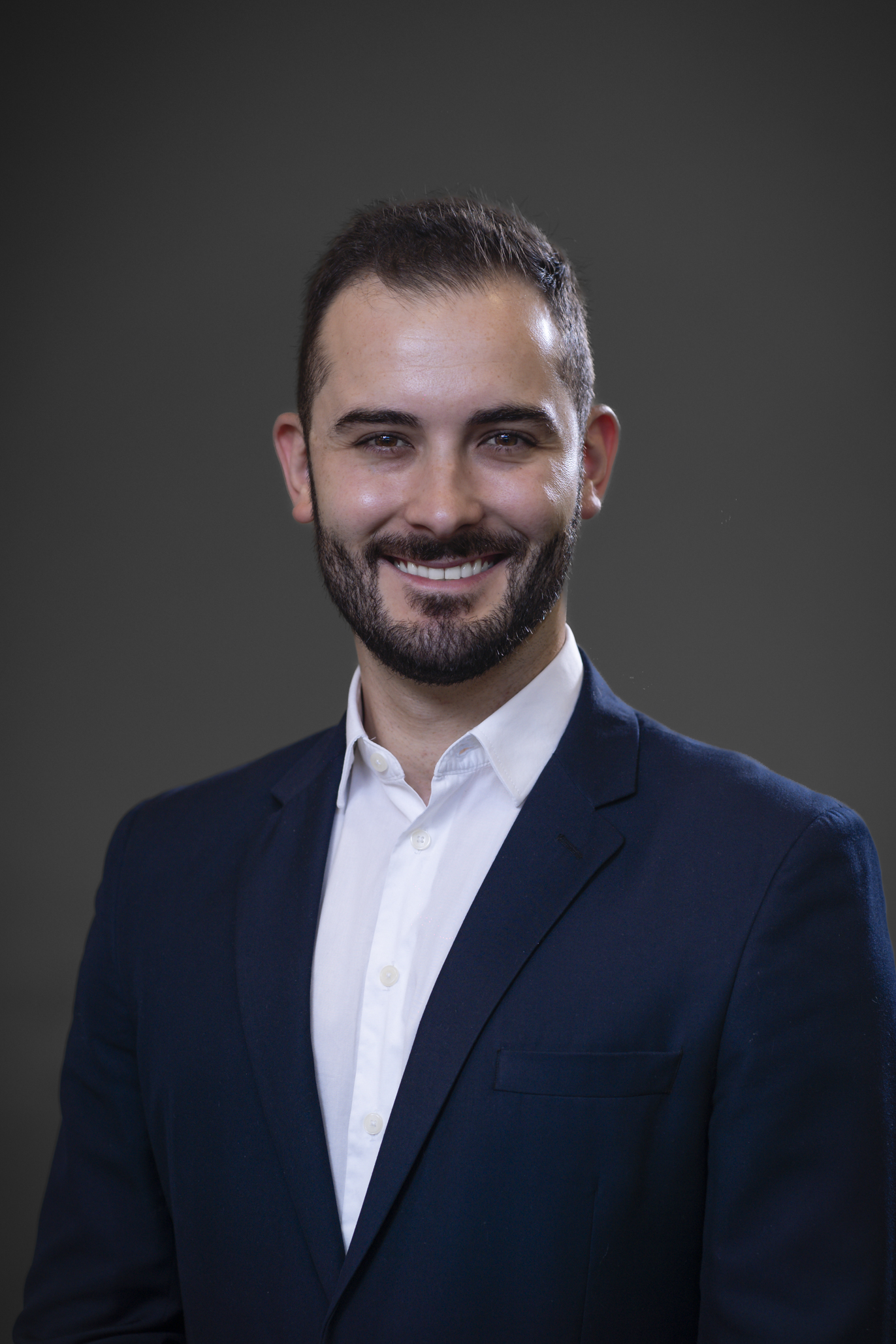
- Riesgo in 2025

Member of the Legislative Assembly of Rio Grande do Sul
- In office 1 February 2019 – 31 January 2023

Personal details
- Born: 10 November 1995 (age 30)
- Party: New Party (since 2017)

Giuseppe Ricardo Meneghetti Riesgo (born 10 November 1995) is a Brazilian politician serving as secretary of partnerships of Porto Alegre since 2025. From 2019 to 2023, he was a member of the Legislative Assembly of Rio Grande do Sul.
