= Amalia Dutra =

Uruguayan genetic biologist

- Born: 1958 (age 67–68); Tarariras, Colonia Department, Uruguay
- Citizenship: American
- Education: University of the Republic
- Occupation: Genetic biologist
- Known for: Work in mapping the Human genome

Amalia Dutra, Ph.D (born 1958), is a Uruguayan-American genetic biologist known for being part of the team that mapped the human genome.

== Biography ==
Amalia Dutra, born in Tarariras, graduated from the Faculty of Science at the University of the Uruguayan Republic in 1983. She decided to devote herself to research at Clemente Estable Institute for Biological Research. Dutra taught genetics at the University of the Uruguayan Republic's Faculties of Medicine, Psychology, and Agronomy. In 1988, she emigrated to the United States of America and found work at the University of Pennsylvania in Philadelphia, researching the genetics of immune disorders at the Children's Hospital of Philadelphia. In 1993, she began researching at the National Human Genome Research Institute (NHGRI) in Washington.

Currently, she is the Director of the Central Laboratory of Cytogenetics and Confocal Microscopy (Cytogenetic and Confocal Microscopy Core) of NHGRI.
