= Eduardo Leite =

Brazilian politician (born 1985)

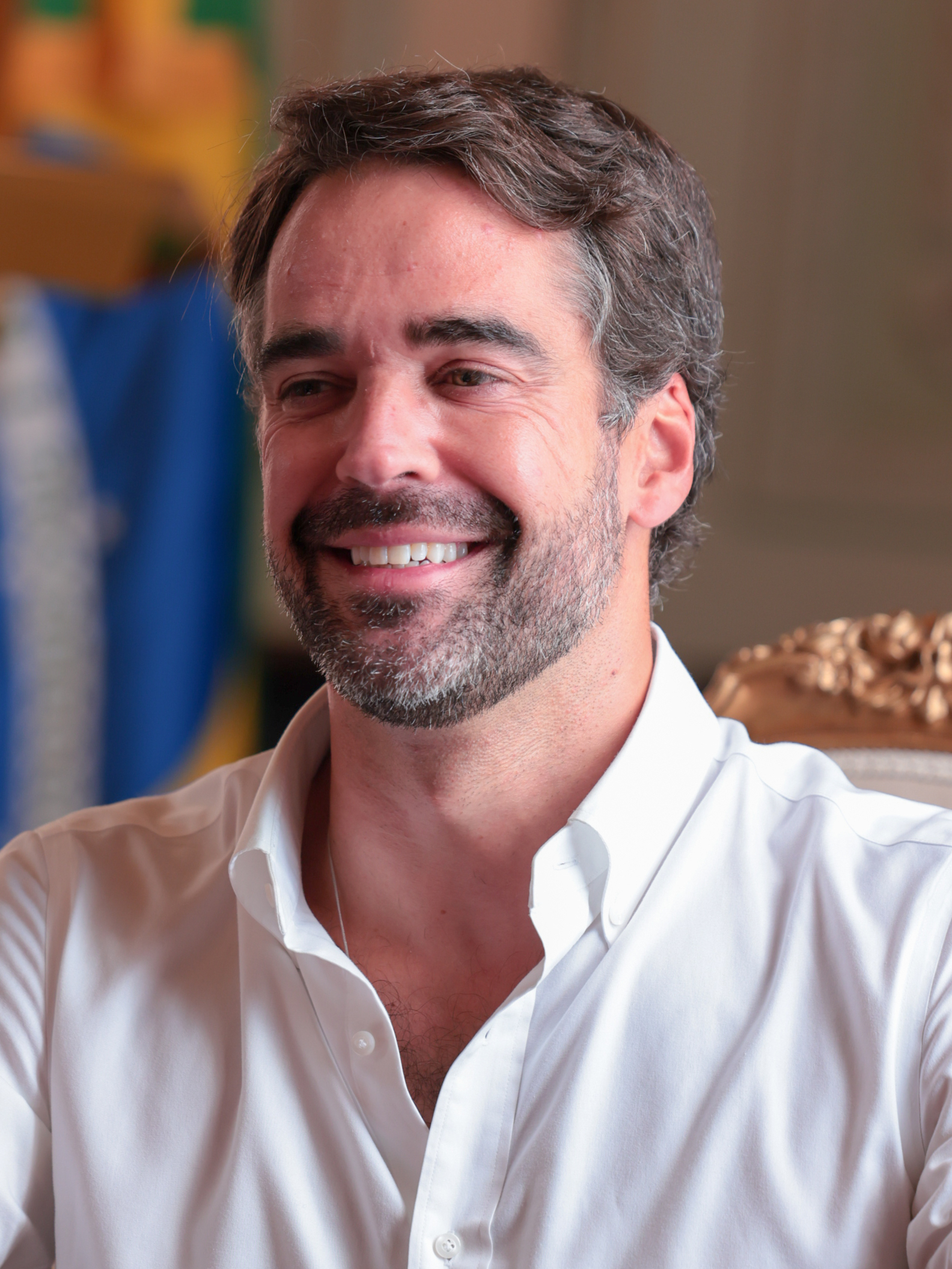
- Leite in February 2026

Governor of Rio Grande do Sul
- Incumbent
- Assumed office 1 January 2023
- Lieutenant: Gabriel Souza
- Preceded by: Ranolfo Vieira Júnior
- In office 1 January 2019 – 31 March 2022
- Lieutenant: Ranolfo Vieira Júnior
- Preceded by: José Ivo Sartori
- Succeeded by: Ranolfo Vieira Júnior

National President of the Brazilian Social Democracy Party
- In office 26 January 2023 – 30 November 2023
- Preceded by: Bruno Araújo
- Succeeded by: Marconi Perillo

Mayor of Pelotas
- In office 1 January 2013 – 1 January 2017
- Deputy: Paula Mascarenhas
- Preceded by: Adolfo Antônio Fetter Júnior
- Succeeded by: Paula Mascarenhas

President of the Municipal Chamber of Pelotas
- In office 1 January 2011 – 1 January 2013
- Preceded by: Milton Rodrigues Martins
- Succeeded by: Luiz Eduardo Nogueira

Councillor of Pelotas
- In office 1 January 2009 – 1 January 2013
- Constituency: At-large

Personal details
- Born: Eduardo Figueiredo Cavalheiro Leite; 10 March 1985 (age 41) Pelotas, Rio Grande do Sul, Brazil
- Party: PSD (2025–present)
- Other political affiliations: PSDB (2001–2025)
- Spouse: Thalis Bolzan (m. 2024; sep. 2026)
- Education: Federal University of Pelotas (LL.B)

Eduardo Figueiredo Cavalheiro Leite (born 10 March 1985) is a Brazilian politician and governor of the state of Rio Grande do Sul. During the state's 2018 election, he won with 53.62% of the vote. Leite was elected governor at 33 years old, becoming the youngest governor in Brazil. In July 2021, Leite came out as gay during an interview for the Brazilian talk show Conversa com Bial, becoming the first openly gay governor in Brazil's history, and one of the first two openly LGBT governors in Brazil (alongside Fátima Bezerra).

He was elected governor of Rio Grande do Sul for the second time in the second round of the 2022 gubernatorial election. Alongside his position as governor of Rio Grande do Sul, Leite was the president of the Brazilian Social Democratic Party from January to November 2023.

== Political career ==
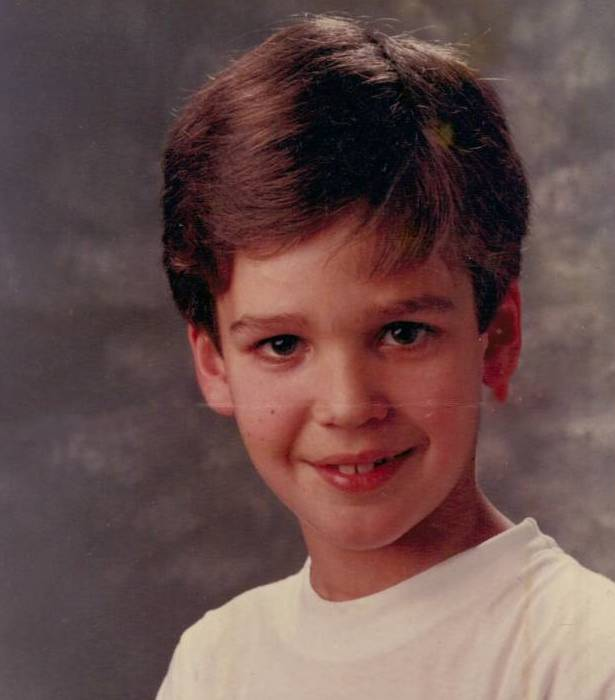
Eduardo Leite at age 5, in 1990.

Leite began his career in politics at a young age, first running for Pelotas city council in 2004 at age 19. Though unsuccessful, Leite began working for local Brazilian Social Democracy Party (PSDB) municipal politicians and, in 2009, would be elected to Pelotas city council. In 2011, Leite became the Pelotas City Council President. In 2012, Leite won the city's mayoral election and served from 2013 to 2016.

During his term as mayor, Leite modernized management methods and prioritized fiscal austerity, which resulted in balanced public accounts. He was able to guarantee funding for major infrastructure works and the remodeling of the urban mobility system, while also improving local health and education indicators. Leite ended his term with an approval rating of 87%.. Concerned with high incumbency rates among Brazilian politicians, Leite opted to not run for re-election, instead backing his vice-mayor, Paula Schild Mascarenhas, in her successful candidacy.

In 2016, Eduardo Leite was chosen by “Americas Quarterly”, a North-American magazine, as one of the five most promising politicians under 40 in Latin America.

After his term as mayor, Leite enrolled in a Master's program in Public Management at Fundação Getúlio Vargas.

== Governor of Rio Grande do Sul ==
=== 2018 gubernatorial campaign ===
In 2017, the PSDB, under Leite's leadership, withdrew support from the administration of José Ivo Sartori. The following year, the PSDB nominated Leite as its gubernatorial candidate. Sartori originally expressed an interest in Leite standing as his running mate. In the first round of elections, Leite earned 35.9% of the vote and faced Sartori in a runoff election. Leite won the runoff election with nearly 54% of the vote.

During the same Legislative elections, Leite's electoral coalition only elected 18 of the 55 members of the State Legislature, requiring Leite to enter into coalition negotiations to obtain a parliamentary majority. Leite was able to secure the support of many formerly Sartori-aligned parties, including the Brazilian Socialist Party, Democrats and the Liberal Party. While initially reluctant, the Brazilian Democratic Movement voted to join Leite's government upon the recognition of similarities between their economic policies. After the successful negotiations, 32 of 55 Assembly members backed the Leite administration.

=== First term ===
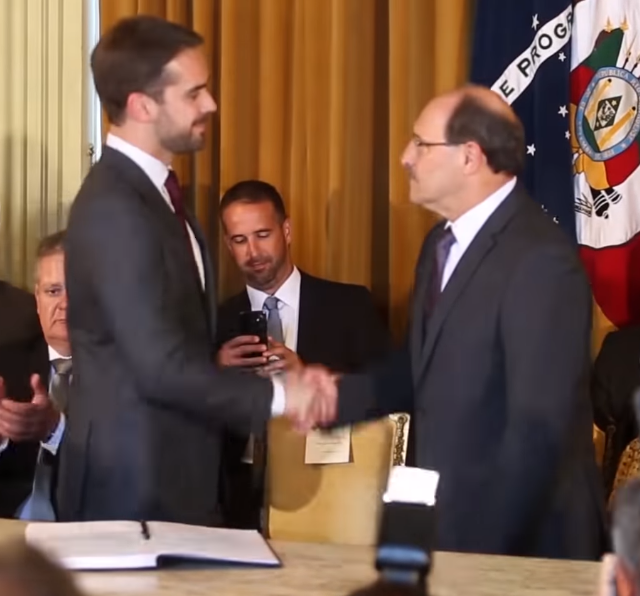
Eduardo Leite and José Ivo Sartori, his opponent in the 2018 runoff, during the government transition.

Leite was sworn as the governor of Rio Grande do Sul in 2019. In his inauguration address, he stressed the necessity of political conciliation to overcome the economic crisis in increasingly polarized times. He allocated most of his cabinet membership to coalition partners, having nine parties represented. Alleging cost reduction, he became the first governor to live in the state's palace since Olívio Dutra.

He established privatizations as a priority, with the state-owned companies of energy, mines and natural gas being its main targets. Since the State Constitution requires referendums to privatize these stated owned companies, Leite introduced a constitutional amendment to abolish this requirement, it was approved by Assembly in May 2019, by 40 ayes vs 13 no, with all but the PT, PDT and PSOL voting in favor. In August 2019, the State Assembly authorized the sale of these state companies, with the process being fully completed in early 2021.

In late 2019, he announced a comprehensive austerity package that would include pension reform and changes to the state public service, Leite described the changes as necessary to restore fiscal responsibility but allied parties were skeptical of the proposal, with the Social Liberal Party initially withdrawing support from the government. After lengthy negotiations with each of the coalition parties and the syndicates, the Assembly approved the reform in January 2020, it was considered a historical victory and the most ambitious reform in the state's history.

In 2021, far-right politician Roberto Jefferson used a homophobic slur against Leite while critiquing the response of his government to the COVID-19 pandemic. On 19 March 2021, Leite filed a criminal complaint against Jefferson. In September 2022, Jeffereson's conviction was definitively confirmed by Rio Grande do Sul State Court of Justice. Jefferson was ordered to pay a fine of R$300,000 (US$55,427).

=== 2022 gubernatorial campaign ===
On 31 March 2022, he resigned as Governor of Rio Grande do Sul to possibly run in the 2022 presidential election, despite his defeat in the 2021 PSDB presidential primary. He eventually announced he would seek reelection as Governor of Rio Grande do Sul. In the first round, the former governor received 26.81% of votes, coming in 2nd place with only 2,441 votes more than Edegar Pretto from the Workers' Party who came in third place with 26.77%. He faced Onyx Lorenzoni in the second round, prevailing over him with 57.12% of votes.

=== Second term ===
Leite was sworn in on 1 January 2023 as governor of Rio Grande do Sul for a second term. In 9 May 2025, he left the Brazilian Social Democracy Party and joined the Social Democratic Party (PSD).

== Political positions ==
Leite is considered a left-leaning member of the PSDB. Leite identified as a social democrat in 2019, and as a social liberal in 2020, arguing that the state has a role to play in regulating business and helping to manage inequality, while also stating that the private sector and social entrepreneurship has a role to play. Prior to this, he has expressed support for same-sex marriage and decriminalization of marijuana, although he took a more conservative stance on the decriminalization of abortion. Leite has also expressed support for urban gun control measures.

Political offices
Preceded by Milton Rodrigues Martins	President of the Municipal Chamber of Pelotas; 2011–2013	Succeeded by Luiz Eduardo Nogueira
Preceded by Fetter Júnior	Mayor of Pelotas; 2013–2017	Succeeded by Paula Mascarenhas
Preceded by José Ivo Sartori	Governor of Rio Grande do Sul; 2019–2022	Succeeded by Ranolfo Vieira Júnior
Preceded by Ranolfo Vieira Júnior	Governor of Rio Grande do Sul; 2023–present	Incumbent
Party political offices
Preceded by Bruno Araújo	National President of the Brazilian Social Democracy Party; 2023	Succeeded by Marconi Perillo
