= Janaína Dutra =

- Born: 30 November 1960; Canindé, Ceará, United States of Brazil
- Died: 8 February 2004 (aged 43); Fortaleza, Ceará, Brazil
- Occupations: Lawyer; LGBTQ+ activist

Janaína Dutra (November 30, 1960 – February 8, 2004) was an LGBTQIA+ activist and a lawyer from Brazil. She is recognized for being the first travesti to carry a professional card from the Brazilian Bar Association.

In 2021 she was honoured with a Google Doodle by Google.

== Biography ==
Janaína Dutra was born in Canindé, Ceará, as part of a family of ten siblings.

From childhood, she enjoyed wearing her sisters' dresses and makeup. At 14, she began receiving prejudiced comments. It was at that time that her family discovered that her gender was not the one assigned at birth. Janaína was supported by her family.

At 17, Janaína moved to Fortaleza to live with her sister, where she worked at Caixa Econômica Federal (a Brazilian bank). She began advocating for LGBTQ rights and started undergoing feminizing hormone therapy. Around the same time, Janaína decided to study Law at the University of Fortaleza (UNIFOR). She graduated in 1986 and became the first travesti to hold a professional license from the Brazilian Bar Association, although her birth name still appears on the document.

Janaína stated in 2000 that:

I got to where I am today because of family support, which is still the foundation of everything. It's what recharges your batteries. A good family relationship gives you the courage to face society.

== Activism ==
Known for carrying a copy of the anti-homophobia law passed by her hometown, Janaína participated in conferences, seminars, and roundtables to defend LGBTQ rights.
