= Ranolfo Vieira Júnior =

Brazilian civil police officer and politician (born 1966)

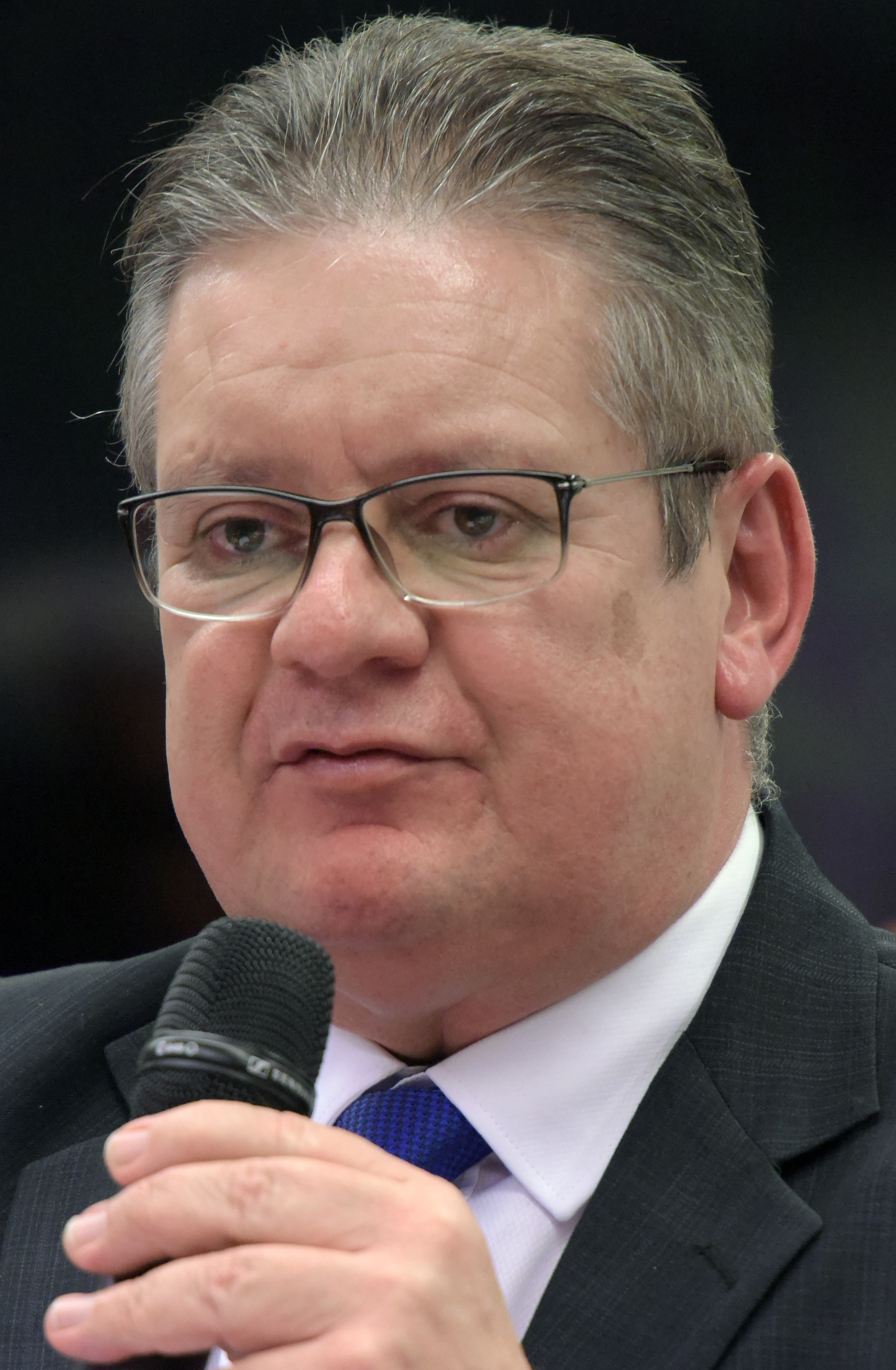

Governor of Rio Grande do Sul
- In office 31 March 2022 – 1 January 2023
- Lieutenant: Vacant
- Preceded by: Eduardo Leite
- Succeeded by: Eduardo Leite

Lieutenant Governor of Rio Grande do Sul
- In office 1 January 2019 – 31 March 2022
- Governor: Eduardo Leite
- Preceded by: José Paulo Cairoli
- Succeeded by: Gabriel Souza

Secretary of Public Security of Rio Grande do Sul
- In office 1 January 2019 – 31 March 2022
- Governor: Eduardo Leite
- Preceded by: Cezar Schirmer
- Succeeded by: Sandro Caron

Personal details
- Born: 7 April 1966 (age 60) Esteio, Rio Grande do Sul, Brazil
- Party: PTB (2013–2021); PSDB (2021–present)
- Education: University of the Sinos River Valley (LL.B.)
- Profession: Police officer and politician

Ranolfo Vieira Júnior (Esteio, 7 April 1966) is a Brazilian civil police officer and politician, member of the Brazilian Social Democracy Party (PSDB). He was elect Vice Governor of Rio Grande do Sul in the 2018 state elections. Under Eduardo Leite governorship, Vieira also was nominated State Secretary of Public Security. After Leite's resignation in March 2022, Vieira became the Governor of Rio Grande do Sul.

== Biography ==
Bachelor of Laws by University of Sinos River Valley, post-graduated in the superior class of Police Officers Formation by the Civil Police Academy of Rio Grande do Sul (Acadepol). Joined the Civil Police in 1998, as officer in Rio Grande. He headed the State Department of Criminal Investigations (DEIC) for 6 years, he was Municipal Secretary of Security of Canoas, head of the Civil Police during Tarso Genro governorship and ran for State Deputy in 2014, unsuccessfully.

Vieira presided the National Council of Civil Police Chiefs and was licensed professor of the Lutheran University of Brazil for 14 years and the Acadepol for 10 years.

In July 2017, he was announced as pre-candidate for Governor of Rio Grande do Sul for the Brazilian Labour Party (PTB). However, due to a coalition made by his party with the Brazilian Social Democracy Party (PSDB), he was nominated for running mate of Eduardo Leite. Upset with homophobic speeches made by the PTB national president, Roberto Jefferson, towards Leite, Vieira Júnior moved to PSDB.

On 28 March 2022, Leite announced his resignation as Governor, scheduling Ranolfo's swear in as Governor for 31 March.

Political offices
Preceded by Cezar Schirmer	Secretary of Public Security of Rio Grande do Sul; 2019–2022	Succeeded by Sandro Caron
Preceded by José Paulo Cairoli	Lieutenant Governor of Rio Grande do Sul; 2019–2022	Succeeded by Gabriel Souza
Preceded by Eduardo Leite	Governor of Rio Grande do Sul; 2022–2023	Succeeded by Eduardo Leite
