= Ana Amélia Lemos =

Brazilian journalist and politician

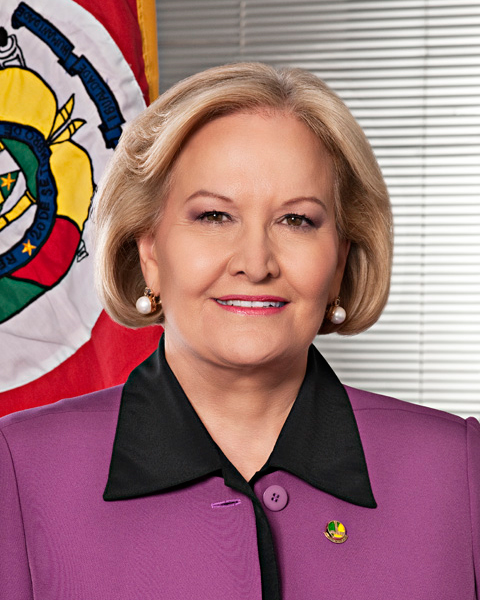

Senator for Rio Grande do Sul
- In office February 1, 2011 – February 1, 2019
- Preceded by: Sérgio Zambiasi
- Succeeded by: Luis Carlos Heinze

Personal details
- Born: March 23, 1945 (age 81) Lagoa Vermelha, Rio Grande do Sul, Brazil
- Party: PSD (2022–present)
- Other political affiliations: PP (2009–22)
- Spouse: Octávio Omar Cardoso (died 2011)
- Education: Pontifical Catholic University of Rio Grande do Sul (B.J.)
- Website: www.anaamelialemos.com.br

Ana Amélia Lemos (born March 23, 1945, in Lagoa Vermelha) is a Brazilian journalist and politician. She worked as a columnist and commentator for RBS in Distrito Federal, before applying the Senator by the Rio Grande do Sul, elected in the General Election 2010. She was the running mate of PSDB presidential candidate Geraldo Alckmin in the 2018 election.

== Biography ==
Graduated in Media by the Pontifical Catholic University of Rio Grande do Sul, Lemos worked as a reporter in Journal of Commerce and the branch of Morning Post and as correspondent of the magazine Overview. She began her career in RBS in 1977, acting as a reporter for economics and producer and host of the "Economic Outlook", the first column of economics at the TV in the Southern Brazil.

In 1979, Ana Amelia moved to GMT, as a reporter for "Zero Hora", RBS TV and Radio Gaúcha. Three years later, she was named RBS's director for Brasília, a post she held until December 2003. Lemos then participated in programs like "Bom Dia Rio Grande", on TV, and Current Gaucho, Gaucho on radio, signing a column in the editorial policy of the newspaper Zero Hora.

=== Political career ===
On March 15, 2010, Lemos announced her retirement from the RBS Group to start a political career. In her first race, she was a candidate of the Progressive Party (PP) for Senator by the state of Rio Grande do Sul, she was elected on October 3, 2010, with 29.54% of the votes, with more than 3,4 million votes. Since then, she has stood out in Congress: she was chosen four times as one of the ten best senators in the Congress in Focus award, in 2013 she was appointed by the Inter-Union Department of Parliamentary Advisory (Diap) as the most influential woman parliamentarian in the National Congress.

At the presidential elections of 2018 Lemos is Geraldo Alckmin's running mate.

=== Personal life ===
Lemos was married to lawyer and politician Omar Octavio Cardoso, who died in 2011.

Party political offices
Preceded by Gardênia Golçaves	PP nominee for Vice President of Brazil; 2018	Most recent
