= Presidente Dutra, Bahia =

Municipality of Bahia, Brazil

Presidente Dutra
- Municipality
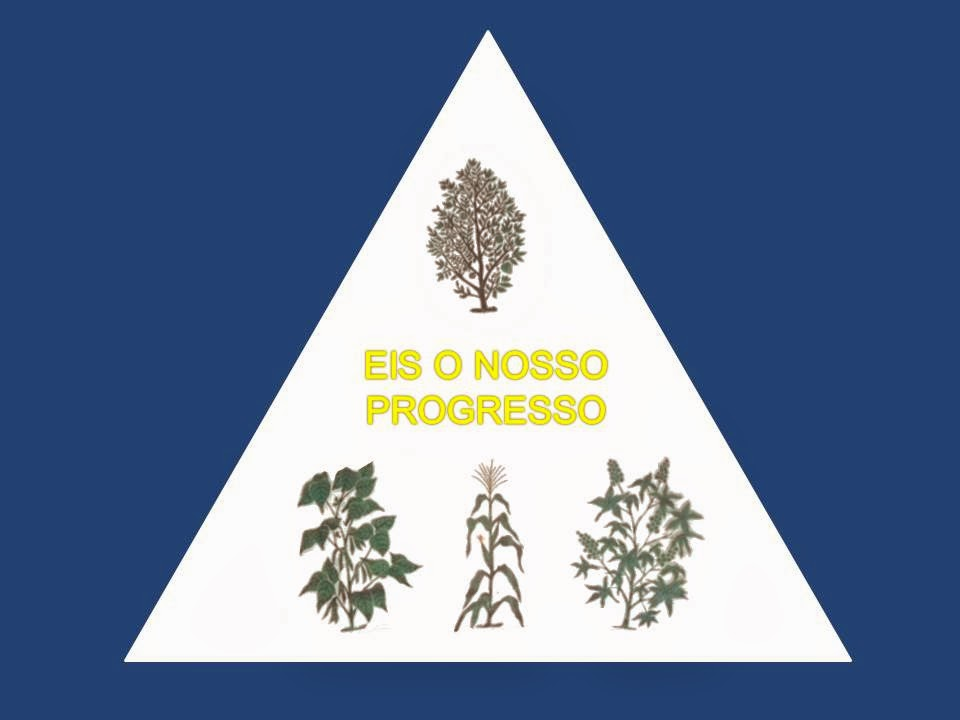
- Flag

- Location in Brazil
- Coordinates: 11°17′45″S 41°59′13″W
- Country: Brazil
- Region: Nordeste
- State: Bahia
- Founded: 1862

Area
  - Total: 163.55 km^{2} (63.15 sq mi)
- Elevation: 660 m (2,170 ft)

Population (2020)
  - Total: 15,160
  - Density: 92.69/km^{2} (240.1/sq mi)
- Time zone: UTC−3 (BRT)
- Postal code: 44930
- Area code: (+55) 64

Presidente Dutra is a municipality in the state of Bahia in the North-East region of Brazil.

== See also ==
- List of municipalities in Bahia
