= José Ivo Sartori =

Brazilian politician (born 1948)

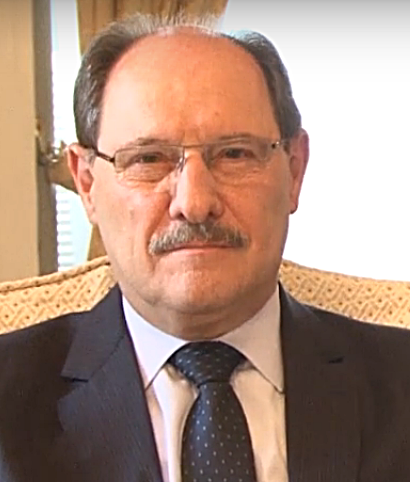

38th Governor of Rio Grande do Sul
- In office 1 January 2015 – 1 January 2019
- Vice Governor: José Paulo Cairoli
- Preceded by: Tarso Genro
- Succeeded by: Eduardo Leite
Other positions
36th Mayor of Caxias do Sul
In office 1 January 2005 – 1 January 2013
Preceded by	Pepe Vargas
Succeeded by	Alceu Barbosa Velho
Federal Deputy for Rio Grande do Sul
In office 1 February 2003 – 1 January 2005
President of the Legislative Assembly of Rio Grande do Sul
In office 31 January 1998 – 31 January 1999
Governor	Antônio Britto
Preceded by	João Luiz Vargas
Succeeded by	Paulo Odone Ribeiro
State Deputy of Rio Grande do Sul
In office 1 February 1983 – 1 February 2003

Personal details
- Born: 25 February 1948 (age 78) Farroupilha, Rio Grande do Sul, Brazil
- Party: MDB

José Ivo Sartori (born 25 February 1948) is a Brazilian politician. He is a former city councilor and former mayor of Caxias do Sul and belongs to PMDB. He is married to Maria Helena Sartori, with whom he has two sons, Marcos and Carolina. He was the 38th Governor of Rio Grande do Sul from 2015 to 2019.

== Biography ==
Sartori graduated in Philosophy at the University of Caxias do Sul. He began his political career in 1976 when he was elected alderman in Caxias do Sul. He won five consecutive terms for the state's Legislative Assembly from 1982 and was elected congressman in 2002. He was also state secretary of Labor and Social Welfare, between 1987 and 1988.

Sartori ran four times for mayor of Caxias do Sul, in 1992, 2000 and 2004, when he was elected with 52.43% in the second round.

In 2008, Sartori was reelected mayor of Caxias do Sul with 54.35% of the votes against 45.65% of the defeated candidate, former Mayor Pepe Vargas (PT).

As Mayor of Caxias do Sul, he acted strongly in the areas of health, traffic and safety, promoting buildings and Basic Health Units reforms, putting patrolling the streets, turning Caxias do Sul in the first city in Brazil to use the automated waste collection opening roads to relieve the traffic, among other measures.
