= Nelson Marchezan =

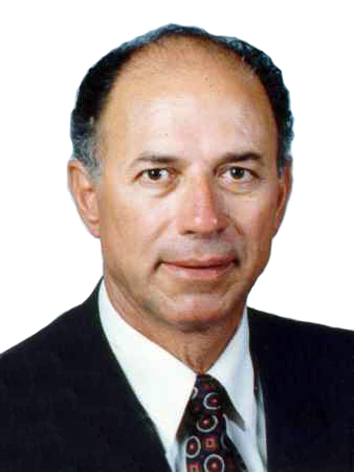

President of the Chamber of Deputies
- In office 26 February 1981 – 2 February 1983
- Preceded by: Flávio Marcílio
- Succeeded by: Flávio Marcílio

Member of the Chamber of Deputies
- In office 1995–2002
- Constituency: Rio Grande do Sul
- In office 1975–1987

State Deputy of Rio Grande do Sul
- In office 1963–1975

City councilor of Santa Maria
- In office 1959–1963

Personal details
- Born: 4 May 1938 Santa Maria, Rio Grande do Sul, Brazil
- Died: 11 February 2002 (aged 63)
- Party: PSDB (1995–2002)
- Other political affiliations: PDC (1958–1965); ARENA (1965–1979); PDS (1980–1993); PPR (1993–1995)
- Spouse: Maria Helena Marchezan
- Children: Nelson Marchezan Júnior
- Education: Federal University of Santa Maria
- Occupation: Bank teller, lawyer, politician

Nelson Marchezan (4 May 1938 – 11 February 2002) was a Brazilian banker, lawyer, and politician who was a state deputy and federal deputy from the state of Rio Grande do Sul. He served as the president of the Federal Chamber of Deputies from 1981 to 1983.

== Biography ==
Marchezan was born on 4 May 1938 in Santa Maria, the son of Guido Marchezan and Maria Colpo Marchezan. He was the grandson of Italian immigrants who established themselves in the Palma neighborhood of Santa Maria. He worked there as a motorist and the private secretary for the bishop in the city, and would later begin his career in politics there. He later became an employee of Banco do Brasil, graduate in accounting from Colégio Santa Maria and study at the Federal University of Santa Maria, where he graduated with a law degree in 1964.

His political career began in 1958 when he was elected a city council member in Santa Maria as a member of the PDC and as a state deputy in Rio Grande do Sul in 1962. After the Military Dictatorship enforced a controlled two party system, he affiliated with the dictatorship’s party ARENA and was reelected in 1966 and 1970. He became the Labor and Social Action Secretary during the Euclides Triches administration.

Marchezan was elected as a federal deputy in 1974 and 1978, and moved again to the PDS. He was elected the president of the Chamber of Deputies for the 1981-1983 session, beating Djalma Marinho. He was reelected again in 1982.

As a political and civilian leader during the government of dictator João Figueiredo (1979-1985) in the Chamber of Deputies, he voted against the enabling of direct votes through the Dante de Oliveira amendment, in opposition to the Diretas Já movement.

He cast a blank (white) ballot in the 1985 presidential election, despite the PDS having put forth Paulo Maluf as their presidential candidate. Marchezan was later defeated as a senatorial candidate in Rio Grande do Sul in 1986, and would later leave politics to work as a banker, accountant, and lawyer. He would later be defeated again by Alceu Collares in the gubernatorial race in Rio Grande do Sul in 1990. His party was in a coalition with the PDT and the gubernatorial campaign of Aldo Pinto in 1986, where future president Dilma Rousseff had an advising role. They would be defeated by the PMDB candidate Pedro Simon. Twenty years later, in an interview, Rousseff attempted to justify the controversial alliance: "Marchezan was a leader of the dictatorship, but he was never an enragé (enraged). The Marchezan wing was the wing of the radicalized small (rural) owners. And he was an ethical guy."

He was the National Secretary of Communications during the Collor administration from April to September 1992, which he left after the president’s impeachment.

He was elected again as a federal deputy in 1994, this time for the PPR. He opposed the creation of the PPB and, for this reason, left the party to join the PSDB, despite resistance by the party’s state branch. He was reelected in 1998.

Marchezan died on 11 February 2002 due to cardiac arrest. He was paid homage to with the renaming of a section of highway RS-804, between Santa Maria and Silveira Martins, the region where he lived, to the "Estrada dos Imigrantes - Deputado Nelson Marchezan".

Marchezan is the father of the former mayor of Porto Alegre, Nelson Marchezan Júnior.
