= Flávio Marcílio =

Brazilian politician (1917–1992)

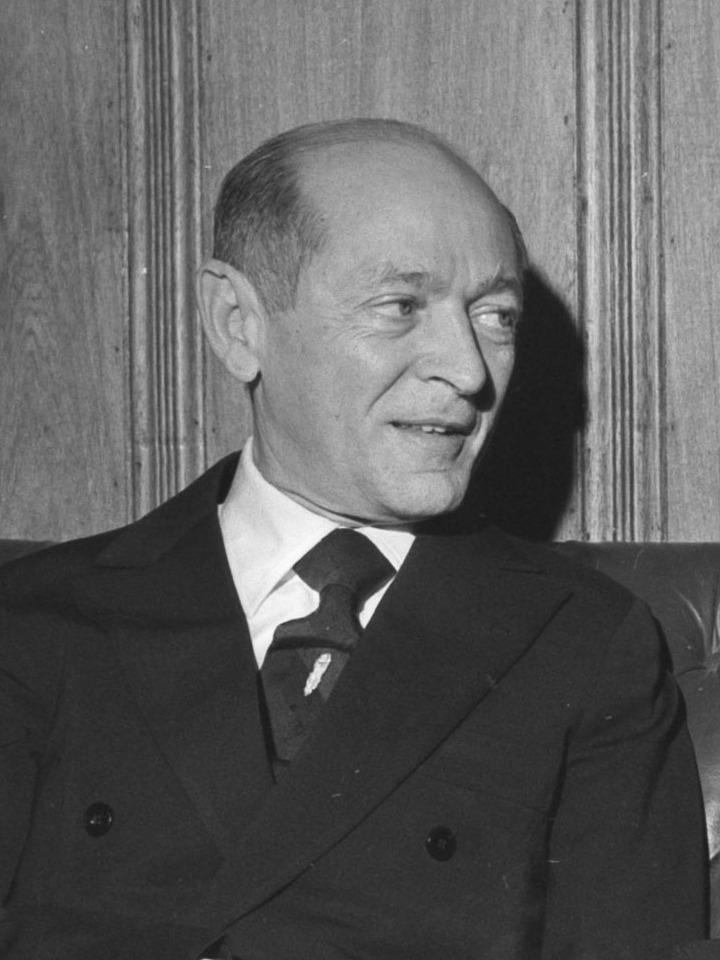
- Marcílio in 1973

Governor of Ceará
- In office 3 July 1958 – 25 March 1959
- Preceded by: Paulo Sarasate
- Succeeded by: Parsifal Barroso

Vice Governor of Ceará
- In office 25 March 1955 – 3 July 1958
- Governor: Paulo Sarasate
- Preceded by: Stênio Silva
- Succeeded by: Wilson Gonçalves

Member of the Chamber of Deputies
- In office 11 April 1964 – 1 February 1987
- In office 23 May 1990 – 1 February 1991
- Constituency: Ceará

Personal details
- Born: Flávio Portela Marcílio; 12 August 1917 Picos, Piauí, Brazil
- Died: 26 January 1992 (aged 74) Brasília, Brazil
- Party: PTB (1954–1965); ARENA (1966–1979); PDS (1980–1992)
- Spouse: Nícia Marcílio
- Profession: Lawyer, professor

Flávio Portela Marcílio (12 August 1917 — 26 January 1992) was a Brazilian lawyer, teacher and politician. Governor of Ceará from 1958 to 1959, he was president of the Chamber of Deputies on three occasions and was the vice president candidate on the ticket representing the Brazilian military regime with Paulo Maluf as president in the 1985 Brazilian presidential election, but were defeated by Tancredo Neves and José Sarney.

== Life and career ==
Son of Francisco Carlos Marcílio and Celecina Portela. Bachelor of Legal and Social Sciences, foi professor da Federal University of Ceará, University of Brasília and the Centro Universitário de Brasília. Resident in Ceará since his youth, he was a lawyer, judge of the Regional Electoral Court and advisor to the Court of Auditors of Ceará, positions he left in 1954 when he began his political career for the Brazilian Labour Party (PTB).

Elected vice-governor of Ceará on the ticket of Paulo Sarasate in 1954, he took office as governor on 3 July 1958 when Sarasate resigned to run for federal deputy, and remained in office until 25 March 1959. Elected substitute federal deputy in 1962, he served under a summons. Appointed president of the Institute of Retirements and Pensions for Stevedores and Cargo Transport (IAPETEC) in 1963, he was appointed deputy on 11 April 1964 after the removal from office of Adalil Barreto by the Institutional Act Number One issued by the military regime. With the arrival of enforced bipartisanship via the Institutional Act Number Two, he joined National Renewal Alliance (ARENA) and was successively re-elected in 1966, 1970, 1974, 1978 and 1982.

President of the Chamber of Deputies on three occasions (1973–1975, 1979–1981, 1983–1985), he experienced the beginning of political opening in the presidency of Ernesto Geisel, and in the presidency of João Figueiredo saw the return to a multi-party system, and Marcílio led the vote that rejected the Dante de Oliveira Constitutional Amendment aimed to reinstate direct elections for president. On 11 August 1984 he was chosen as candidate for vice president on the ticket of Paulo Maluf by the Democratic Social Party (PDS) national convention, but this ticket was defeated in the 1985 presidential election by Tancredo Neves and José Sarney. In 1986 he ran for a new term as federal deputy but was left as a substitute, however his family was represented in the Brazilian Constituent Assembly that drafted the Constitution of 1988 by his niece, Moema São Thiago.

Marcílio assumed his last term as federal deputy on 23 May 1990, days after the resignation of Luís Marques, who was appointed general director of the National Department of Works Against Droughts (DNOCS) by president Fernando Collor.

He was the only native of Piauí to preside over the Chamber of Deputies and also the only one born in the state to compose a presidential ticket; Franklin Dória, born on Ilha dos Frades, Bahia, was the only representative of Piauí to preside the Chamber of Deputies.

In the 1990 elections, he contested his last election for the Chamber of Deputies, for the PDS. However, he was unsuccessful and was left as third substitute in his coalition, behind César Cals Neto.
