= Hélio Garcia =

Brazilian politician (1931–2016)

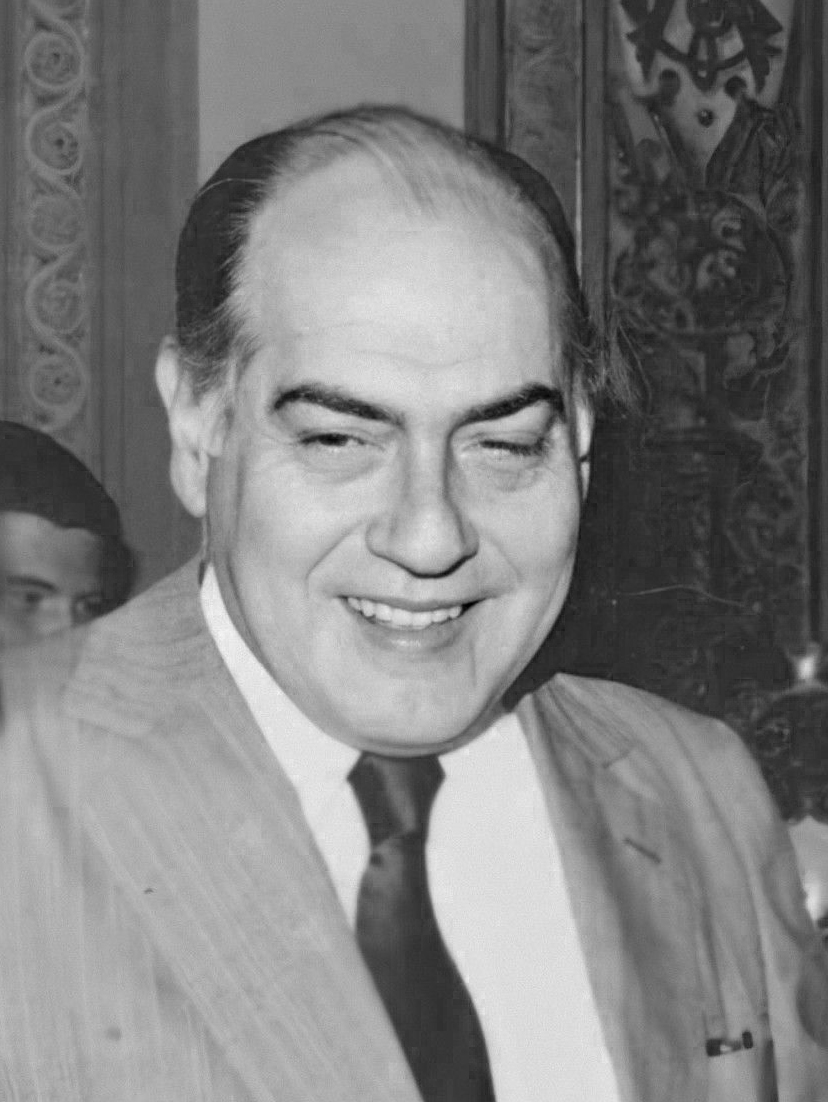
- Garcia

Governor of Minas Gerais
- In office March 15, 1991 – January 1, 1995
- Lieutenant: Arlindo Porto
- Preceded by: Newton Cardoso
- Succeeded by: Eduardo Azeredo
- In office August 14, 1984 – March 15, 1987
- Lieutenant: None
- Preceded by: Tancredo Neves
- Succeeded by: Newton Cardoso

Lieutenant Governor of Minas Gerais
- In office March 15, 1983 – August 14, 1984
- Governor: Tancredo Neves
- Preceded by: João Marques
- Succeeded by: Júnia Marise

Mayor of Belo Horizonte
- In office April 12, 1983 – August 14, 1984
- Preceded by: Júlio Laender
- Succeeded by: Antônio Carlos Carone

Member of the Chamber of Deputies
- In office February 1, 1979 – February 1, 1983
- Constituency: Minas Gerais
- In office February 1, 1967 – February 1, 1971
- Constituency: Minas Gerais

State Deputy of Minas Gerais
- In office February 1, 1963 – February 1, 1967
- Constituency: At-large

Personal details
- Born: Hélio de Carvalho Garcia; March 16, 1931 Santo Antônio do Amparo, Minas Gerais
- Died: June 6, 2016 (aged 85) Belo Horizonte, Minas Gerais
- Party: PTB (1990–2016)
- Other political affiliations: UDN (1945–1965); ARENA (1965–1979); PP (1979–1981); PMDB (1981–1990); PRS (1990)
- Profession: Lawyer; Politician

Hélio de Carvalho Garcia (March 16, 1931 – June 6, 2016) was a Brazilian lawyer and politician. He served as governor of Minas Gerais from 1984 to 1987 and again from 1991 until 1995.

== Biography ==
Garcia was born in Santo Antônio do Amparo, Minas Gerais, on March 16, 1931. He received his law degree from the Federal University of Minas Gerais (UFMG) in Belo Horizonte. He began his political career as a state deputy in the Legislative Assembly of Minas Gerais from 1963 to 1967.

=== Political career ===
In 1982, Garcia was elected vice governor of Minas Gerais as the running mate of Tancredo Neves during the country's first direct gubernatorial elections since military rule. Neves and Garcia took office as governor and vice governor of Minas Gerais, respectively, on March 15, 1983. Soon after taking office, Governor Neves appointed Garcia as the Mayor of Belo Horizonte. (At the time, the Mayor of Belo Horizonte, the state capital, was still an appointed position, and there was no direct election of mayor. Garcia served simultaneously as both the vice governor of Minas Gerais and the mayor of Belo Horizonte from April 1983 until August 14, 1984.

On August 14, 1984, Governor Tancredo Neves resigned from office to begin his campaign for President of Brazil. Vice Governor Garcia succeeded him as the new Governor of Minas Gerais. Garcia, a member of the PMDB, served his first tenure as governor August 1984 until March 1987.

Garcia was elected governor of Minas Gerais in 1990, this time as a member of the Brazilian Labour Party (PTB). He served as governor from 1991 until January 1, 1995. He then largely retired from politics and returned to his home in Santo Antônio do Amparo. In 1998, Garcia ran for a seat in the Federal Senate, but lost that election.

Garcia had suffered from serious illnesses during his later life, including heart arrhythmia, coronary artery disease and Alzheimer's disease. He was admitted to Segundo o Hospital Unimed hospital in Belo Horizonte on May 28, 2016, for pneumonia and respiratory failure. He died from respiratory failure at the same hospital on June 6, 2016, at the age of 85. His funeral was held at the Parque da Colina Cemetery and Crematorium on June 14. The current governor of Minas Gerais, Fernando Pimentel, declared three days of mourning in the state following his death.

Brazil's interim President Michel Temer called Garcia was one of the pillar who helped Tancredo Neves with the re-democratization of Brazil, in a message posted to Twitter following his death.
