= Dante de Oliveira =

Brazilian politician (1952–2006)

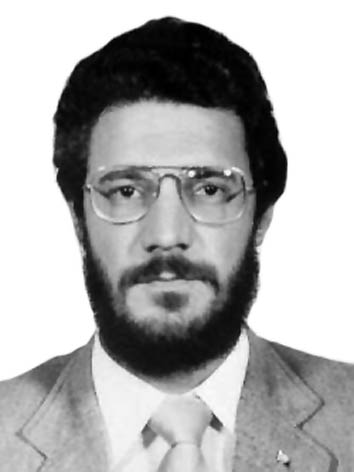

Governor of Mato Grosso
- In office 1 January 1995 – 6 April 2002
- Preceded by: Jayme Campos
- Succeeded by: Rogério Salles

Mayor of Cuiabá
- In office 1 January 1993 – 31 March 1994
- Preceded by: Frederico Campos
- Succeeded by: José Meirelles
- In office 4 June 1987 – 1 June 1989
- Preceded by: Estevão Torquato da Silva
- Succeeded by: Frederico Campos
- In office 1 January 1986 – 28 May 1986
- Preceded by: Alfredo Ferreira da Silva
- Succeeded by: Estevão Torquato da Silva

Minister of Reforms and Agrarian Development
- In office 28 May 1986 – 2 June 1987
- President: José Sarney
- Preceded by: Nélson de Figueiredo Ribeiro
- Succeeded by: Marcos Freire

Federal Deputy from Mato Grosso
- In office 1 February 1983 – 1 January 1986

State Deputy from Mato Grosso
- In office 1 February 1979 – 1 February 1983

Personal details
- Born: 6 February 1952 Cuiabá, Mato Grosso, Brazil
- Died: 6 July 2006 (aged 54) Cuiabá, Mato Grosso, Brazil
- Party: MDB (1976–1979); PMDB (1980–1990); PDT (1990–1997); PSDB (1997–2006)
- Education: Federal University of Rio de Janeiro

Dante Martins de Oliveira (6 February 1952 – 6 July 2006) was a Brazilian politician who was the governor of Mato Grosso state and the mayor of Mato Grosso's capital, Cuiabá, for three terms. He was also a federal deputy who became the Minister of Agrarian Development under president José Sarney from 1986 to 1987. He is well known for his work with the Diretas Já movement, which fought for the direct election of presidents in Brazil. As a federal deputy, he became most well known for proposing a constitutional amendment that would have mandated for direct presidential elections, the Dante de Oliveira Amendment.

== Biography ==
Oliveira was born on 6 February 1952 in Cuiabá, the son of Sebastião de Oliveira and Maria Benedita Martins de Oliveira.

He attended the Federal University of Rio de Janeiro (UFRJ), graduating in 1970 with a degree in civil engineering. While at UFRJ, he became involved with the 8th October Revolutionary Movement at a time when the movement had the option to participate politically during the military dictatorship through the Brazilian Democratic Movement (MDB).

Upon returning to his hometown of Cuiabá, Oliveira ran for his first political office as councilman for the city but lost. He eventually was elected a state deputy to the state legislature of Mato Grosso in 1978. As the two-party system in the military dictatorship ended and the redemocratization process began, Oliveira officially affiliated himself with the newly renamed PMDB, being elected as a federal deputy in 1982. During his time as federal deputy, he presented to the National Congress a constitutional amendment that mandated a reestablishment of the direct vote for presidential elections, dubbed the Dante de Oliveira amendment.

=== Diretas Já ===
Although the idea for creating a constitutional amendment to reestablish direct presidential elections cannot be credited to Oliveira entirely, his proposed amendment and its subsequent failure in the National Congress had massive repercussions, as the movement for direct democracy in Brazil grew beyond the Congress, and became a popular movement in Brazil known as Diretas Já. The first mass protest for the reimplementation of direct democracy occurred in the city of Abreu e Lima in Pernambuco on 31 March 1983, sprouting protests in São Paulo. These sporadic protests later became an organized movement, beginning with a protest of 30,000 people in Curitiba on 12 January 1984, spreading to most every major city in Brazil from then on.

Fearful of what was occurring in Congress, then leader of the military dictatorship João Figueiredo strongly pressured members of the dictatorship-aligned PDS to vote down the measure. Along with, Oliveira received a note from Tancredo Neves that affirmed that Oliveira's amendment was all but likely to be voted down. Despite this, the central faction of the movement began to take to the streets, with an IBOPE poll taken on the eve of the eventual vote showing that 84% of those questioned approved of the amendment. As a last minute effort to stave off the movement, the federal government put forward their own amendment, dubbed the "Figueiredo amendment" which, among other things, would have prevented the reestablishment of direct elections until 1988. The Dante de Oliveira amendment, however, was ultimately put to a quorum vote on 25 April 1984, but did not obtain the 2/3rds vote in order to bring the measure to a full vote in Congress, largely due to the absence of the PDS members in Congress. The outcome deepened the already stark divisions and contributed to Neves' landslide win in the 1985 presidential election.

=== Post-dictatorship political career ===
In 1985, Oliveira was elected to be the mayor of Cuiabá for the PMDB. He only served several months out of his first term before being tapped by then-president José Sarney in 1986 to be the Minister of Agrarian Development. His vice-mayor, Estevão Torquato da Silva, succeeded him. He returned to his post as mayor in 1987 and attempted to resolve the city's financial shortcomings. After his departure from the mayoralty in 1989, in 1990, he switched his affiliation to the Democratic Labour Party (PDT). Afterwards, he ran as a federal deputy for that year's elections, but was not elected. He ran again and was elected mayor of Cuiabá for another term. He resigned from the position in 1994 to become the governor of Mato Grosso. After prolonged disagreements with the PDT, Oliveira was expelled from the party due to their discontinued support of him. He subsequently switched affiliations to the PSDB and won reelection in 1998. His political reputation was damaged when it was alleged that João Arcanjo Ribeiro, who was involved with organized crime in Cuiabá, helped fund his reelection campaign in 1998. He left the position to run for senator for Mato Grosso in 2002, but was not elected.

In 1995, then-president Fernando Henrique Cardoso awarded Oliveira the Grand Officer class of the Order of Military Merit by decree.

=== Death ===
While tentatively planning to run once more as a federal deputy, Oliveira died on 6 July 2006 in Cuiabá due to pneumonia that was exacerbated by complications from diabetes. After his death, there were various homages to him and his legacy, including the renaming of Avenida dos Trabalhadores in Cuiabá to Avenida Governador Dante Martins de Oliveira. He is buried in Piedade Cemetery, the oldest cemetery in Cuiabá, within the Historic Center of Cuiabá.
