= Dante de Oliveira Constitutional Amendment Bill =

Constitutional Amendment Bill no. 5, of 1983
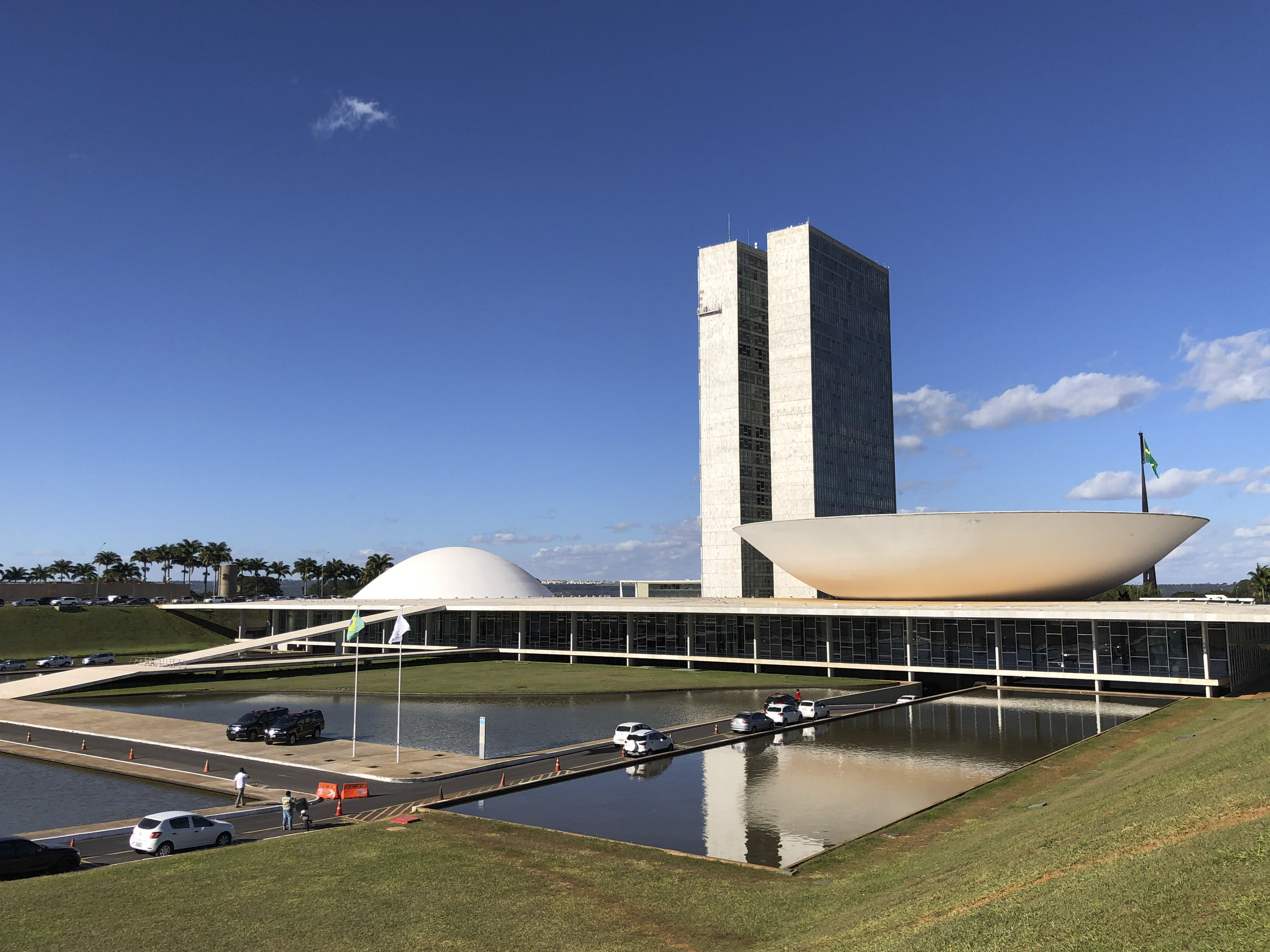

National Congress of Brazil
- Long title: Disposes about the direct election for President and Vice President of the Republic.
- Citation: PEC 5/1983
- Considered by: Chamber of Deputies

Legislative history
- Introduced by: Dep. Dante de Oliveira (PMDB–MT)
- Introduced: 18 April 1983
- First reading: 18 April 1983
- Second reading: 25 April 1984
- Voting summary: 298 voted for; 65 voted against; 3 abstained; 113 absent

Keywords
- Direct election
- Status: Not passed

The Constitutional Amendment Bill no. 5, of 1983 (Portuguese: Proposta de Emenda Constitucional n° 5 de 1983), commonly known as Dante de Oliveira Amendment, introduced by then federal deputy Dante de Oliveira, aimed ro reinstate direct elections for President of Brazil, by changing Articles 74 and 148 of the 1967 Brazilian Constitution, once the democratic tradition had been interrupted by the military dictatorship.

== History ==
The enormous popular pressure for the approval of the bill became one of the largest social-political movements of Brazil's history and was named Diretas Já. According to an IBOPE poll, 84% of the Brazilian people was favorable for the approval of the bill.

Besides the popular support, the bill was rejected by the Chamber of Deputies on 25 April 1984. Because it is a constitutional amendment, a two thirds majority (320 deputies) was necessary for the approval.

With the amendment rejection, the 1985 presidential election was indirect. However, internal talks of the opposition to the military regime, specially in the Brazilian Democratic Movement Party, endorsed by the media and with strong popular support, divided the government majority in the Congress, causing the election of the opposition leader Tancredo Neves for President of the Republic. A cycle of five military presidents had ended, which began in 1964. However, Neves was never sworn in, dying due to serious health issues on 21 April 1985. His running mate, José Sarney was inaugurated on 15 March, being also one of the responsible for the redemocratization process of the country, even after supporting the military for 20 years.

== Voting ==
Voting; Chamber of Deputies
Ballot →	25 April 1984
Required majority →	320 out of 479
Yes: • PMDB (201); • PDS (55); • PDT (23); • PTB (11); • PT (8)	298 / 479
No: • PDS (65)	65 / 479
Abstentions: • PDS (3)	3 / 479
Absentees: • PDS (112); • PTB (1)	113 / 479
