= Nelson Marchezan Júnior =

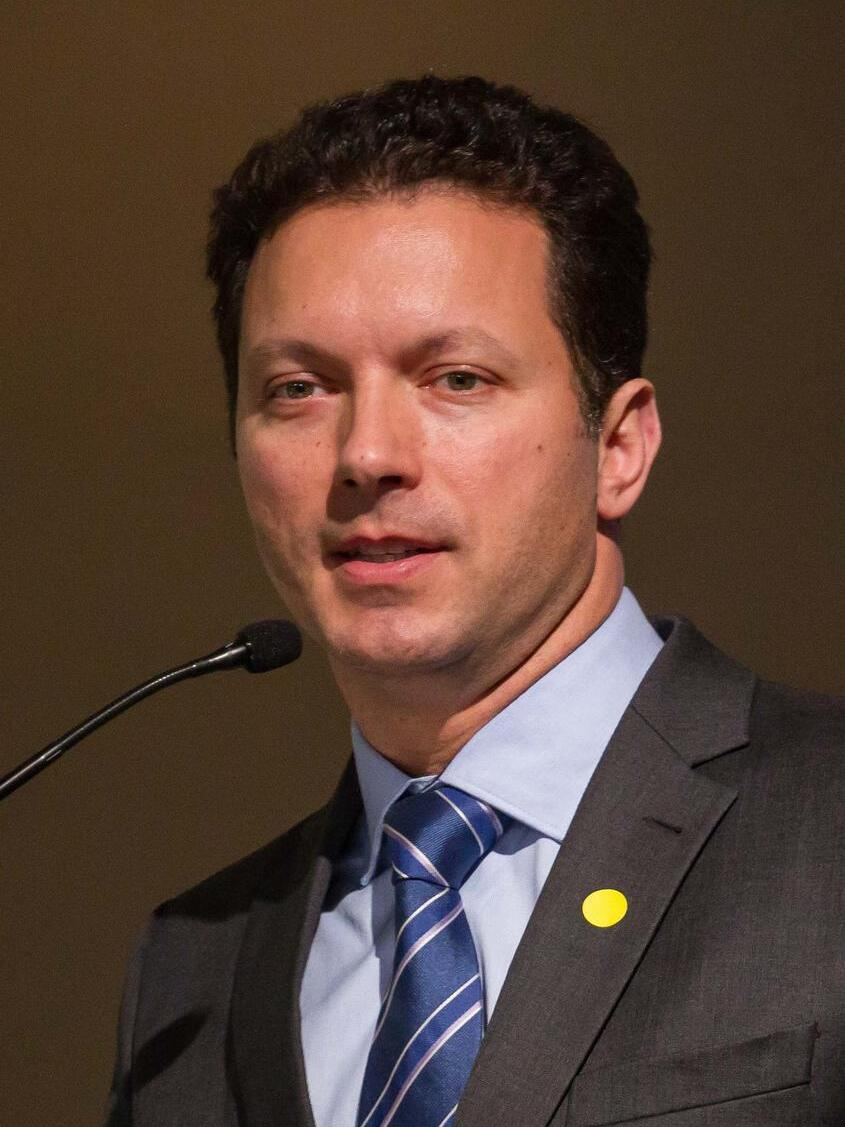

65th Mayor of Porto Alegre
- In office 1 January 2017 – 1 January 2021
- Preceded by: José Fortunati
- Succeeded by: Sebastião Melo

Federal Deputy of Rio Grande do Sul
- In office 1 February 2011 – 1 January 2017

State Deputy of Rio Grande do Sul
- In office 1 February 2007 – 1 February 2011

Personal details
- Born: 30 November 1971 (age 54) Porto Alegre, Rio Grande do Sul, Brazil
- Party: PSDB (2002–present)
- Relatives: Nelson Marchezan (father)
- Education: Unisinos

Nelson Marchezan Júnior (born 30 November 1971) is a Brazilian lawyer and politician, affiliated with the PSDB. He was a federal deputy for the state of the Rio Grande do Sul and later became the mayor of Porto Alegre from 2017 to 2021.

== Personal life ==
Marchezan Júnior is the son of former President of the Federal Chamber of Deputies Nelson Marchezan (1938–2002). He finished secondary school at Colégio Rosário in Porto Alegre. He studied Physical Education at UFRGS and publicity and advertising at PUCRS without graduating. In 1995, he graduated with a law degree from Unisinos. After graduating, he spent a year travelling through Europe. In 1998, on returning from his travels, Marchezan Júnior opened a language learning school, along with Rogério Belloc Ramos.

Currently, Marchezan Júnior is married to lawyer Tainá Vidal, who he began dating in December 2017, and has a child, Benício, born in April 2019. In addition, he is the father of two other children: Nelson Marchezan Neto, with Nadine Dubal, who he was previously married to, and Bernardo, who was born in 2016, but who Marchezan Júnior only recognized in December 2017.

== Political career ==
Professionally a lawyer, Marchezan Júnior had no intention of going into politics until his father's death in 2002. That year, he ran and was elected with 60,071 votes, but the Electoral Court invalidated his candidacy due to having not registered with a valid party. He was not able to prove that he was a member of the PSDB a year before the elections, and thus had his position revoked by the Superior Electoral Court. He thus went into public office in 2003 as the director of Development, Agribusiness, and Governments of Banrisul during the administration of governorGermano Rigotto.

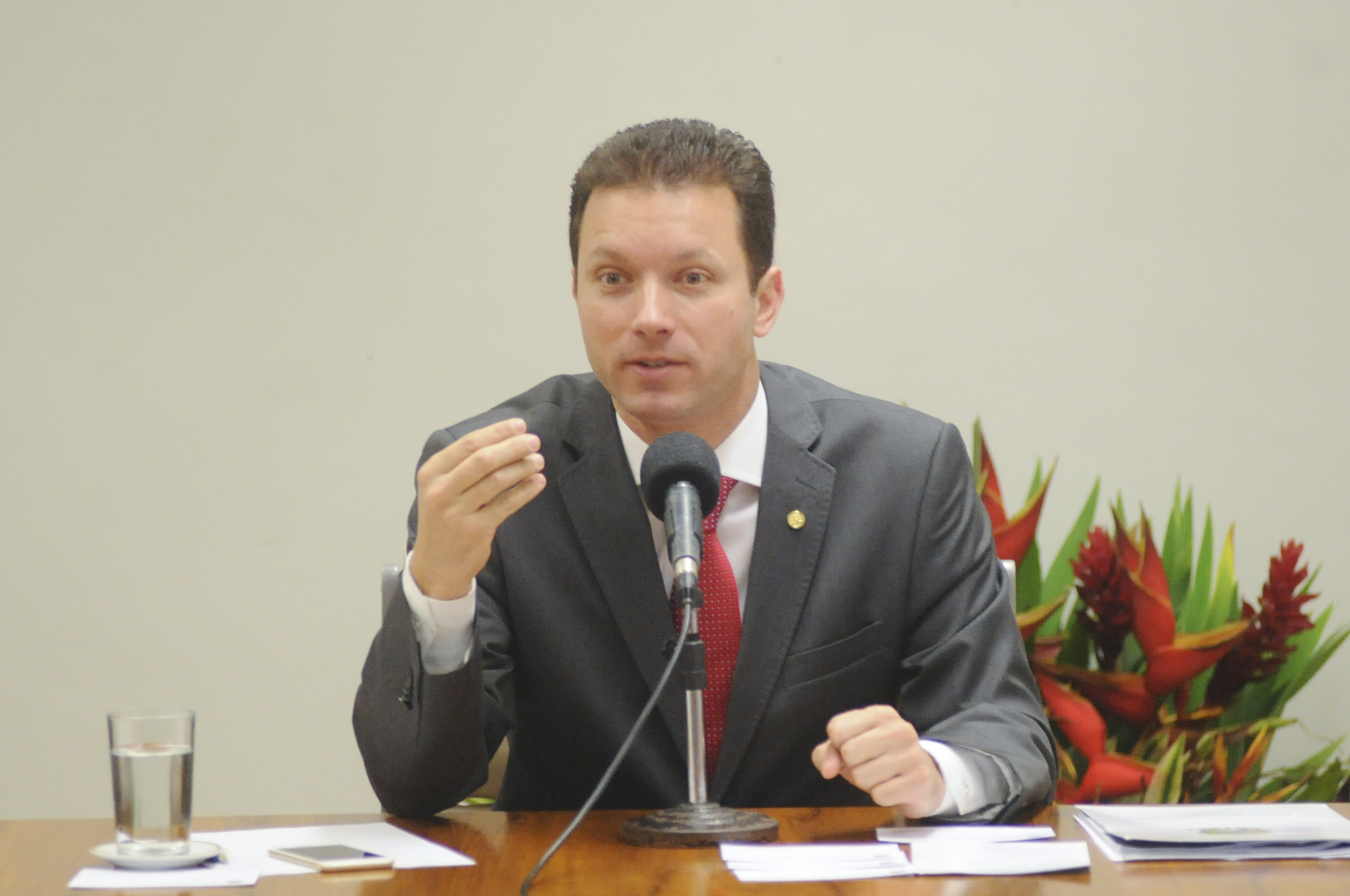
Marchezan Júnior was elected federal deputy in 2010. In this 2015 photo, he is giving a speech during the launching ceremony of a parliamentary front.

He left the position in 2006, when he was elected a state deputy from the PSDB from 2007 to 2011. In 2010, he was elected a federal deputy with 92,394 votes.

In December 2011, surprising the leaders of the PSDB and in opposition to the protest and request of former president Fernando Henrique Cardoso, he signed the CPI of Privatization, proposed by Protógenes Queiroz (PCdoB-SP).

On 14 June 2016, he voted in favor of the revoking of federal deputy Eduardo Cunha's from the Ethics Committee at the Federal Chamber of Deputies.

Starting in 2015, he was present in every protest in favor of the impeachment of President Dilma Rousseff, becoming closer to conservative groups such as Movimento Brasil Livre and Vem Pra Rua. He voted in favor of the impediment of her mandate in 2016. Two weeks after the impeachment, however, he mentioned that he was almost regretful of his vote in a debate about the concession of pay increases to state employees of the Judiciary and the Public Prosecutor's Office.

== Mayor of Porto Alegre ==
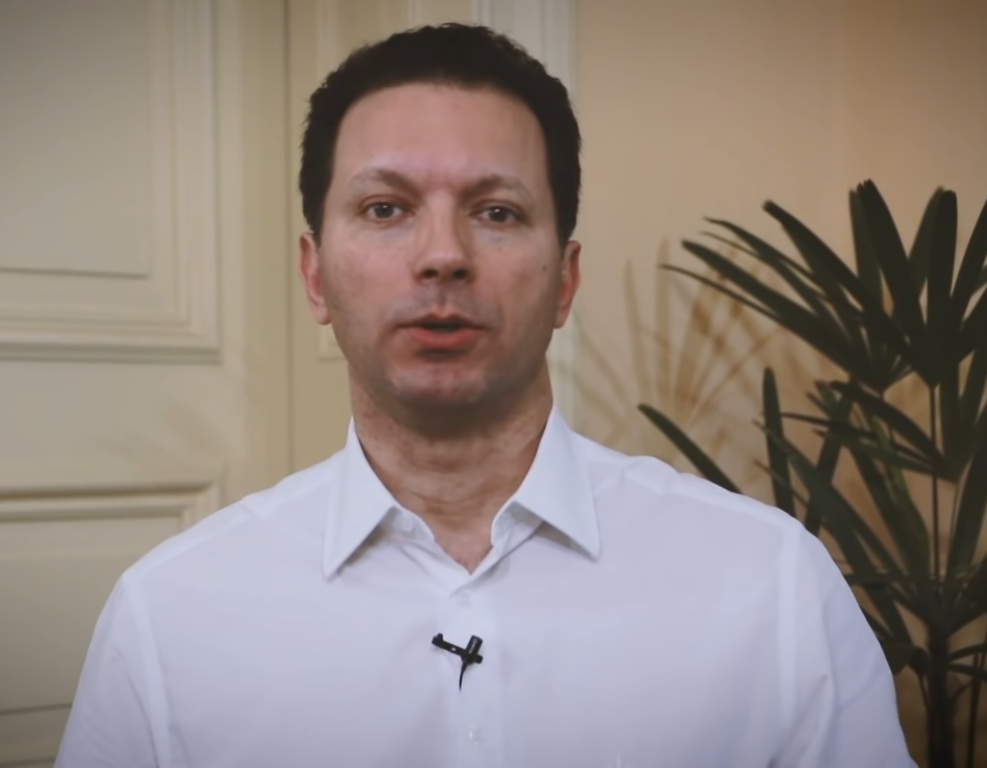
Prefeito Marchezan Júnior at the Paço Municipal.

=== Campaign ===
In 2016, Marchezan Júnior became a candidate for mayor in Porto Alegre as part of the Forward Porto Alegre, made up of the PSDB, PP, PMB, and PTC, his vice-mayoral candidate being lawyer Gustavo Paim (PP). In the second round, his candidacy also received the support of the PTB, PSC, PR, SD, PRP, PTdoB, and PV. During the campaign, he defended the idea that, if he were to win, part of the reason as to why would have been due to the decision by the national president of his party, Aécio Neves. Neves intervened in the state branch in 2015 and barred the group led by former governor Yeda Crusius, nominating Marchezan Júnior as president of the state branch, which permitted his run for mayor.

He was elected in the second round with 402,165 votes, which represented 60.5% of valid votes, defeating opponent Sebastião Melo (PMDB). His campaign was supported by groups such as the Free Brazil Movement and business owners. With this victory, Marchezan Júnior became the first mayor of Porto Alegre from the PSDB.

=== 2017 ===
After his election, Marchezan Júnior announced that he would curt the number of municipal government agencies from 37 to 23, the lowering of the number of secretaries from 29 to 15, and the firing of 340 commissioned positions, a number that had increased for many years, had come to be just 5.5% more or even less than the prior administration in May 2019. He also created a database for the selection of commissioned positions, such as how many public servants had been nominated by political parties, called the Banco de Talentos. He still announced projects and concessions to private-public partnerships, the principal one among them the Orla de Guaíba. Meanwhile, he started his administration without a majority in the Municipal Chamber of Porto Alegre, with his coalition electing just 6 city councilors of the 36 in the assembly. In January 2017, Marchezan Júnior enabled public investment into the Carnaval blocs in the city, as had occurred in previous years. He implemented a series of austerity measures upon taking office, putting forth 10 decrees that would reduce monthly expenses from the city government by way of the suspension of new public competitions and the creation of a committee to evaluate public spending.

The year ended with 15 drops in leadership positions in government, including secretaries, secretaries-adjunct, political leadership, and directors of public businesses.

=== 2018 ===
In the first two years of being in government, his administration was criticized for not doing the weeding and mowing of parks and plazas, as well as lowering the number of times that public spaces were cleaned. Marchezan Júnior asserted that it was due to the fiscal state of the municipality. As such, later that year, he announced a delay in the payment of public servants and presented a new career plan that changed worker's salaries, but pulled back from the plan after protests that lasted 40 days. The city government sought to approve financial reforms that would increase levies with the IPTU, but it was rejected in a vote of 25 to 10, being criticized for representing a tax increase on the majority of real estate.

In 2018, he began to implement his plans towards public-private partnerships, presentign plans towards lighting, trash collection, and digital clocks in the city. He also sanctioned the General Law of Taxis. Along with this, Marchezan Júnior presented a new project of reforms on the IPTU, initially on an urgent basis, but the process was taken back to expand the discussion period. In December of that year, the MDB decided to enter the governmental coalition, expanding their coalition from 11 seats to 17 seats.

=== 2019 ===
At the beginning of 2019, the proposed changes towards the IPTU were approved by the Municipal Chamber with a 22–14 vote. Throughout 2019, the relationship between the mayor and the Progressistas began to deteriorate, culminating in the release of various people linked to the party and subsequently the leaving of people associated with the PP from municipal government.

=== 2020 ===
In 2020, Marchezan Júnior sent in the Budgetary Guidelines Law to the Municipal Chamber with a revenue forecast of R$476 million. In August, the Municipal Chamber approved the opening of an impeachment processes against the mayor with a vote of 31 out of the 36 councilors, due to accusations of misuse of R$3.1 million from the Municipal Health Fund towards publicity campaigns.

=== Collective transportation ===
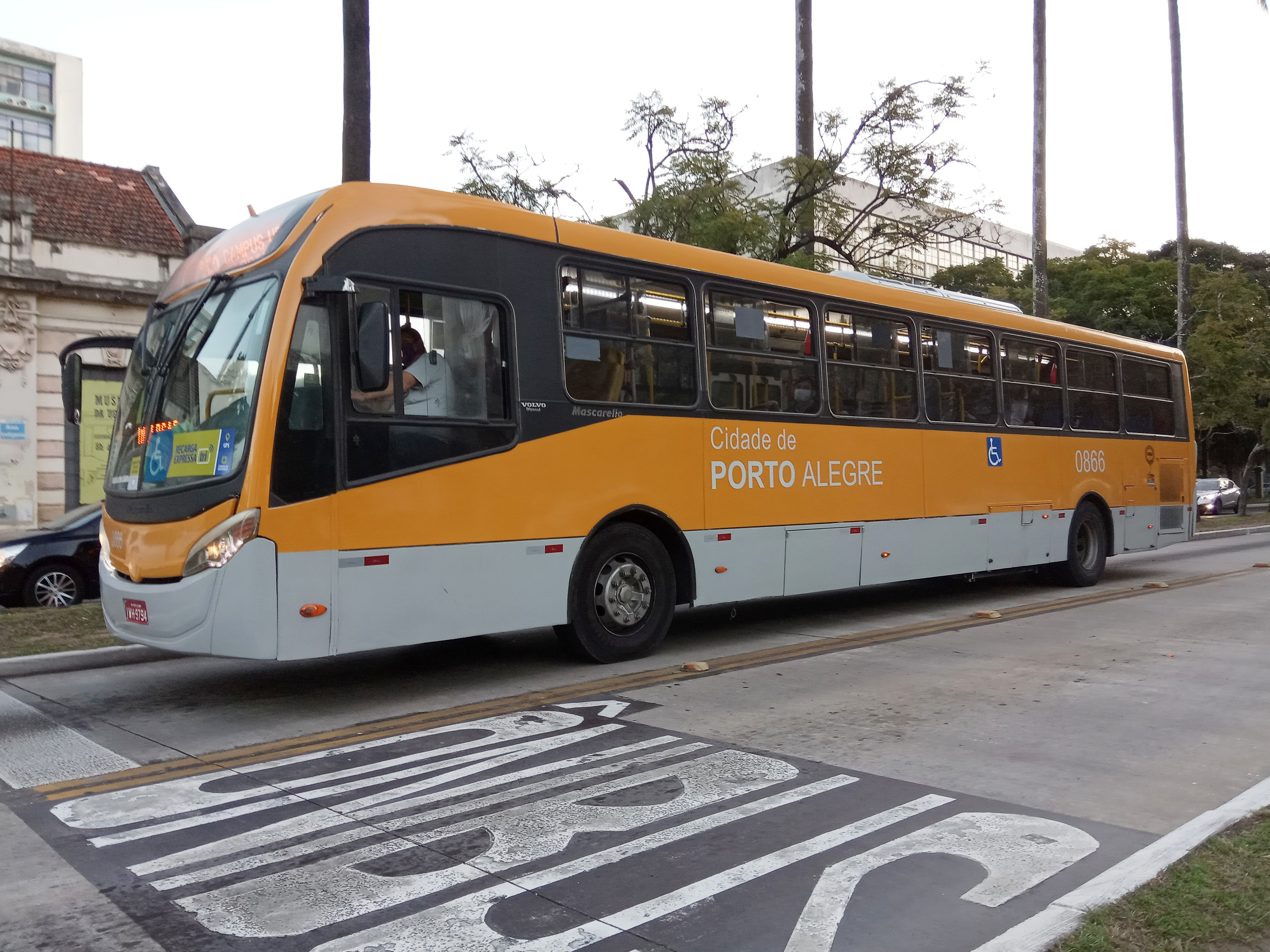
A bus from Carris, a public company that was at the center of controversies after Marchezan Júnior considered privatizing it.

==== Carris ====
During his 2016 campaign, Marchezan Júnior denied that he had the intention to privatizeCarris, the public company that runs the city's transport network. However, in June 2017, he affirmed that Carris could be privatized. The following month, he emphasized once again that the business should be privatized or make bids on lines. In June 2018, the municipal government hired a consulting company to analyze Carris and Marchezan Júnior again defended privatization as a possible option for the company.

In January 2019, 83 Carris vehicles turned 13 years old and as a result could not be circulated anymore according to municipal laws altered the prior year, which raised the usage lifespan from 10 to 12 years. The business issued a notice for the renovations of the fleet in March, a measure following a decree signed by Marchezan Júnior to increase the lifespan of their use from 12 years to 14 years.

Despite promises that the new buses would begin circulating in October, the difficulty in obtaining financing delayed the purchase. In November, the Municipal Chamber authorized the business to license almost R$40.1 million real in credit for the purchase of 87 buses. The municipality further promised that the fleet would start operating in February of the following year. However, a new notice was issued in February, at the moment that the city legislation obligated the exchange of 97 buses. The new buses only began to hit the streets in October 2020, a year and a half after the promises were made by the municipality.

==== Bus fees ====
Even as he denied on the campaign trail that he would end with the second round of free fares in Porto Alegre, created in 2011 to end with the distortions in the transport system, Marchezan Júnior ended the program in July 2017 by decree, maintaining it only for students. The following month, city councillors from the PDT, PSOL and PT went to the courts to request an annulment of the decree, which occurred in a limited manner, under the justification that the charges produced irreparable harm to the population. The municipality increased resources in September without success. In March 2018, Marchezan Júnior extinguished the exemptions to the bus fares, again through decree . In June 2019, the Tribunal suspended the decree. However, it was later adjudicated on appeal and the fees began to be charged again.

Three months after assuming the mandate, the mayor increased, by decree, the bus fares from R$3.75 to R$4.05, which motivated a series of protests between February and March. The following year, the municipality increased the bus fare even further to R$4.30 and ended the exemptions on fares. In February 2019, his administration raised the fares against from R$4.30 to R$4.70. In a publication to social media, Marchezan Júnior claimed that there had been a reduction in fares by R$0.45, when in fact there was an increase of 40 cents. The post was made private after much criticism by the population. There were protests against the increase. At the beginning of 2020, the municipality began discussions about yet another increase in bus fares, that would increase fares to R$5.05. However, due to the COVID-19 pandemic, which decreased bus ridership drastically, and as a result, the increase was postponed.

In December 2019, the Municipal Chamber approved a proposal sent by the executive to end exemptions on bus fares on people aged 60 to 64, maintaining it only for those who had bought tickets who are below the threshold of three regional minimum wages.

==== Proposals to lower bus fares ====
During Marchezan Júnior's mandate, the municipality implemented 17 kilometers of lanes exclusively for buses and taxis until May 2020. In January 2020, the mayoralty sent a group of proposed laws to the Municipal Chambers to lower the bus fares, nicknaming the effort Projeto Transporte Cidadão. The proposal prevents the charge of R$.28 per kilometer driven by ridesharing companies, exemptions for specific rates, and would have also implemented congestion pricing to pay for cars that would drive through Porto Alegre. It also included the charging of a mobility rate from businesses, instead of the payment of the individual "vale-transporte"; and the end of management rates for the Fare Compensation Chamber. In February 2020, the Municipal Chamebr rejected a proposal to eliminate bus fare collectors on buses. In August 2020, the municipality revised the congestion pricing proposal, proposing instead to implement it only in the Centro Histórico neighborhood, with automatic tolling through cameras.

=== Impeachment proceedings ===
On 5 August 2020, impeachment proceedings were opened against Marchezan Júnior, beginning with a protocoled request made by, among others, a provisional city councilor candidate for the PRTB. That night, the mayor protested by way of social media, claiming that the usage of healthcare money from their funds for publicity campaigns in the same area is permitted by the Brazilian Constitution.

The Municipal Chamber accepted the petition and started the process, unlike the 5 requests for detterence made prior, with the vote of 31 out of 36 councilors, under the justification of misused funds from the health fund. That same day, an investigative committee was formed to evaluate the request, composed, through a lottery system, by councilors Hamilton Sossmeier (PTB), Alvoni Medina Nunes (Republicanos), and Ramiro Rosário (PSDB). Marchezan Júnior pointed to 29 people as witnesses during the impeachment process, including political adversaries, many of whom said they did not know why they were made to be involved in the process. The investigative committee, in turn, determined that only 10 of the testimonies could be used. The mayor's defense also asked that the copy of the process of the former vice-mayor, Eliseu Santos, who was assassinated in 2010, would be joined with the deterrence process.

In an interview to TV Pampa days after the impeachment request was accepted by the councilors, Marchezan Júnior declared that he would show "who is each of the councilors...that are wanting to stick on me this [vice] of corruption." In response, the president of the City Council, Reginaldo Pujol of the Democrats, affirmed that they would not vote in the mayor's favor since "he keeps saying that he will corner everyone".

The report produced by the commission concluded that, on 28 August, for the prosecution of the investigation of the complaint of impediment presented, with it having been up to the plenary of the chamber to approve the measure or not, which would have ultimately brought the investigation to the city council.

=== CPI of the Marchezan administration ===
A parliamentary inquiry committee (CPI) was created by the municipal chamber to investigate possible irregularities in the Marchezan Júnior administration, starting on 3 October 2019. In August 2020, the report further corroborated the previous commission's findings and recommended an indictment against him for leveraging influence on the bureaucracy, influence peddling, administrative impropriety, bidding exemptions, passive corruption, and interest trafficking. To that end, the CPI concluded the work recommending an indictment against Marchezan Júnior, as well as his municipal secretary of Institutional Relations, Christian Lemos, for false testimonies, and businessman and former director of Procempa Michel Costa for influence peddling.

According to the report, the Banco de Talentos, a program that sought to have professionals submit resumes for them to run for vacancies in public service positions, and thus eliminating political favoritism, caused waste in public administrative spending and was used to camouflage political hirings, classifying it as fraudulent for giving a "cloak of technicality for mere political hirings". Along with this, the CPI identified passive corruption when Marchezan Júnior travelled toParis in July 2017, with travel expenses paid by Capester, a company in which Costa was a part of. The business' application was adopted by the EPTC for the complaint on traffic infractions that same year. The report also identified collusion between Marchezan Júnior and Costa for favoritism of private interests from Safeconecta in the installation of testing equipment for GPS monitoring in the Carris bus fleet, which was characterized as leveraging the administration's influence in the bureaucracy. The report was forwarded to the Public Prosecutor's office and the Courts of Account of the state.

=== Removal from mayoralty ===
In February 2021, the State Court of Accounts published a report about the Municipal Department of Water and Sewage (DMAE). According to the court, Marchezan Júnior acted with “conduct contrary to the public interest, unreasonable and imprudent" in its management in order to privatize it. As a result, services provided by DMAE were harmed, implicating an increase in interruptions in the distribution of water of more than 40% compared to the year prior, with the previous administration. The report also recounts how the mayor procrastinated on the contracting of essential services for the business, even after repeated warnings by managers. In the four years that it was run by Marchezan Júnior's administration, DMAE had budgeting losses that increased to R$41 million real, as a consequence of the attitudes of the government towards DMAE. Along with not hiring the services, he himself denied the replacement of personnel at the entity and took away its autonomy so that it could not replace them itself.
