= Santo Antônio do Amparo =

- Municipality
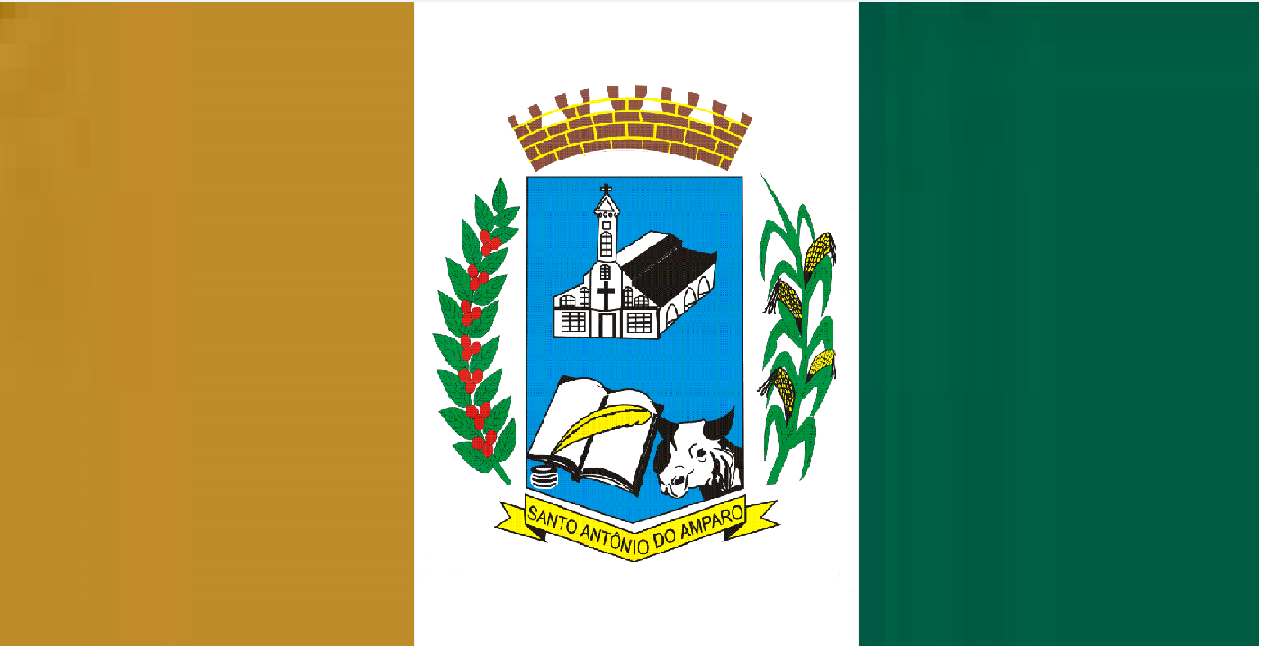
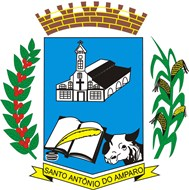
- Flag Coat of arms

- Location in Minas Gerais state

- Location in Brazil
- Coordinates: 20°56′45″S 44°55′8″W
- Country: Brazil
- Region: Southeast
- State: Minas Gerais

Area
  - Total: 488.89 km^{2} (188.76 sq mi)

Population (2020)
  - Total: 18,613
  - Density: 38.072/km^{2} (98.606/sq mi)
- Time zone: UTC−3 (BRT)
- Postal code: 37262-xxx
- Area code: +55-37
- Website: www.stoantonioamparo.mg.gov.br

Santo Antônio do Amparo is a city in the southern part of the state of Minas Gerais, Brazil. The population is 18,613 (2020 est.) in an area of 488.89 km^{2}. The municipality was founded in 1938.

== Notable residents ==
- Hélio Garcia, former Governor of Minas Gerais, born in Santo Antônio do Amparo

== See also ==
- List of municipalities in Minas Gerais
