= Newton Cardoso Jr. =

Brazilian politician (born 1979)

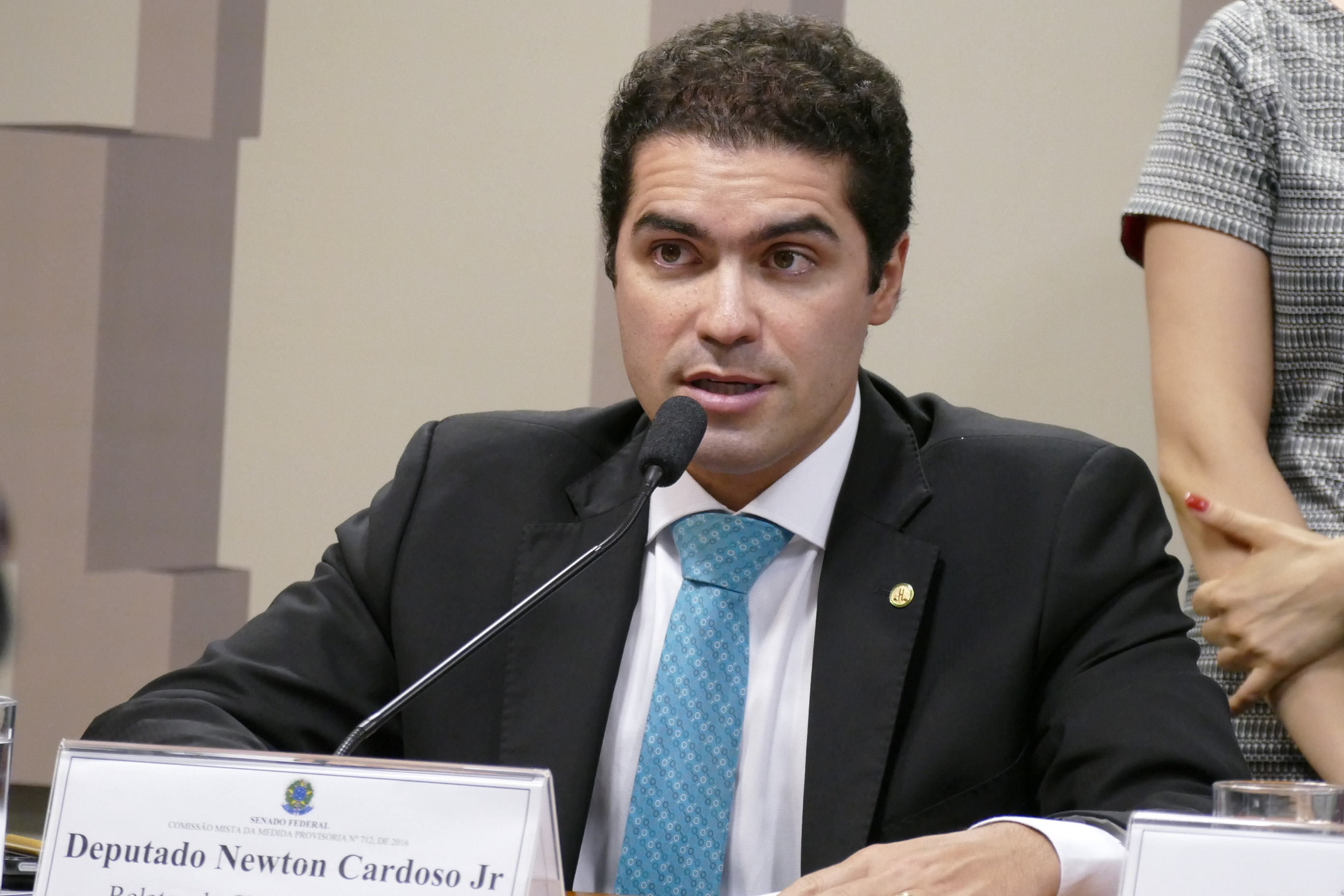

Federal Deputy for Minas Gerais
- Incumbent
- Assumed office 1 February 2015

Personal details
- Born: 11 November 1979 (age 46) Belo Horizonte, Minas Gerais, Brazil
- Party: MDB

Newton Cardoso Junior (born 11 November 1979) is a Brazilian politician who has been a Brazilian Democratic Movement federal deputy for Minas Gerais since 2015.

He was named in the 2016 Panama Papers leak.

His father was the former Governor of Minas Gerais Newton Cardoso.
