= Newton Cardoso =

Brazilian politician (1938–2025)

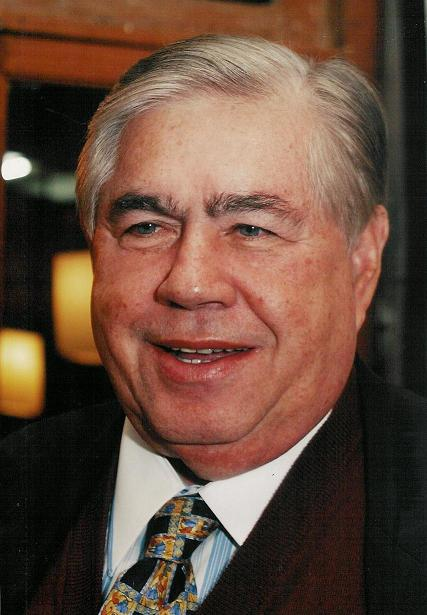

Governor of Minas Gerais
- In office 15 March 1987 – 15 March 1991
- Vice Governor: Júnia Marise
- Preceded by: Hélio Garcia
- Succeeded by: Hélio Garcia

Personal details
- Born: 22 May 1938 Brumado, Bahia, Brazil
- Died: 2 February 2025 (aged 86) Belo Horizonte, Minas Gerais, Brazil
- Party: Brazilian Democratic Movement Party

Newton Cardoso (22 May 1938 – 2 February 2025) was a Brazilian politician who served as a Member of the Chamber of Deputies and as Governor of Minas Gerais from 1987 to 1991. He died from multiple organ failure in Belo Horizonte, Minas Gerais, on 2 February 2025, at the age of 86. His son, Newton Cardoso Jr, is a member of the Chamber of Deputies.
