= Franco Montoro =

Brazilian politician and lawyer (1916–1999)

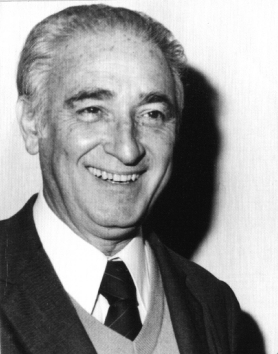

Governor of São Paulo
- In office 15 March 1983 – 15 March 1987
- Lieutenant: Orestes Quércia
- Preceded by: José Maria Marin
- Succeeded by: Orestes Quércia

Minister of Labour and Social Security
- In office 8 September 1961 – 12 July 1962
- President: João Goulart
- Preceded by: Segadas Viana
- Succeeded by: Almino Afonso
Legislative offices
Member of the Chamber of Deputies
In office 1 February 1995 – 16 July 1999
Constituency	São Paulo
In office 12 July 1962 – 1 February 1967
Constituency	São Paulo
In office 2 February 1959 – 8 September 1961
Constituency	São Paulo
Senator for São Paulo
In office 1 February 1971 – 15 March 1983
Preceded by	Auro de Moura Andrade
Succeeded by	Fernando Henrique Cardoso
State Deputy of São Paulo
In office 1 August 1946 – 23 September 1950
Constituency	São Paulo
In office 1 August 1941 – 16 July 1945
Constituency	São Paulo
Party political offices
National President of the Brazilian Social Democracy Party
In office 25 June 1988 – 1 September 1991
Preceded by	Office established
Succeeded by	Tasso Jereissati

Honorary President of the Brazilian Social Democracy Party
- In office 1994–1999
- Preceded by: Office established
- Succeeded by: Vacant (1999 – 2001); Fernando Henrique Cardoso

Personal details
- Born: 14 July 1916 São Paulo, São Paulo, Brazil
- Died: 16 July 1999 (aged 83) São Paulo, São Paulo, Brazil
- Party: PDC (1947–1965); MDB (1965–1980); PMDB (1980–1988); PSDB (1988–1999)
- Spouse: Lucy Pestana Silva
- Children: 7
- Education: University of São Paulo; Faculty of Philosophy, Sciences and Letters of São Bento

André Franco Montoro (Portuguese: [ɐ̃ˈdrɛ ˈfrãku mõˈtoru]; 14 July 1916 – 16 July 1999) was a Brazilian politician and lawyer. He was born in São Paulo as the son of André de Blois Montoro and Tomásia Alijostes. He was a senator and governor of São Paulo, winning against São Paulo mayor Reynaldo de Barros in the latter. He was a member of several parties, such as PDC, MDB, PMDB and one of the founders of PSDB. He was also a law philosopher and a professor at PUC-SP, who wrote several law books.

Montoro is credited as being one of the key figures in the Diretas Já movement, along with Tancredo Neves and Ulysses Guimarães, which helped to bring about the return of direct elections to Brazil.

The São Paulo/Guarulhos International Airport is named after him.

== Montoro government ==
Montoro's government decentralized the state into 42 regions, leaving school meals to municipalities. He built thousands of kilometers of country roads and expanded water and sewage networks, in addition to building (on average) one school a week during his tenure. In his government, he had the creation of the first secretariat for the environment and the first police station for the defense of women.

Political offices
Preceded by José Maria Marin	Governor of São Paulo; 1983–1987	Succeeded by Orestes Quércia
