= Presidente Tancredo Neves =

Municipality of Bahia, Brazil

- Municipality
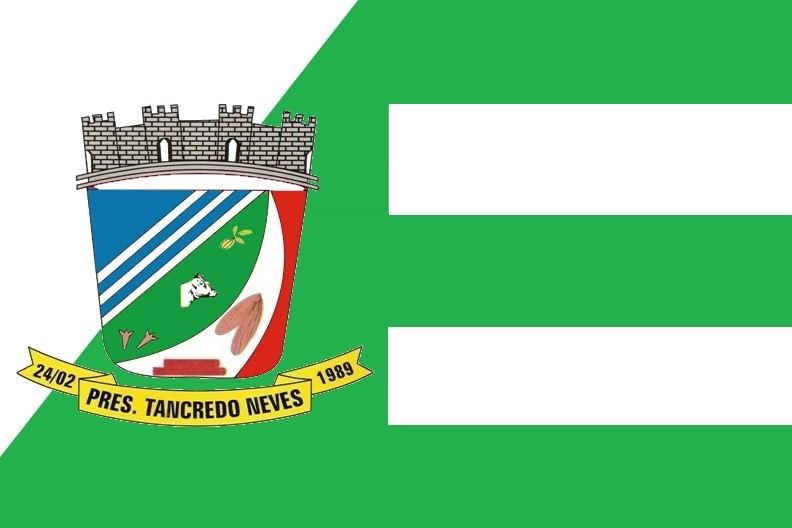
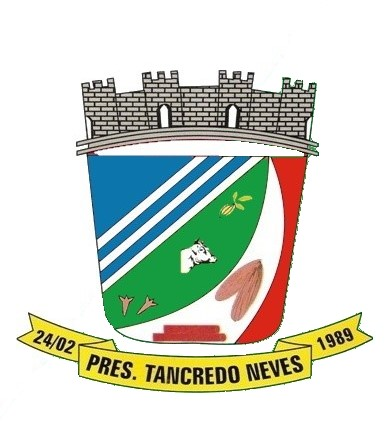
- Flag Coat of arms

- Location in Bahia state

- Location in Brazil
- Coordinates: 13°26′56″S 39°25′12″W
- Country: Brazil
- Region: Northeast
- State: Bahia

Area
  - Total: 417.20 km^{2} (161.08 sq mi)

Population (2020)
  - Total: 28,004
  - Density: 67.124/km^{2} (173.85/sq mi)
- Time zone: UTC−3 (BRT)

Presidente Tancredo Neves is a municipality in the state of Bahia in Brazil. The population is 28,004 (2020 est.) in an area of 417.20 km^{2} (161.08 sq mi). The town is named after Tancredo Neves, elected president of Brazil in 1985.
