= Unisinos =

Brazilian private Jesuit university

Coordinates: 29°47′40″S 51°09′14″W

Unisinos University
- Universidade do Vale do Rio dos Sinos
- Symbol and logo of Unisinos
- Motto: Desafie o amanhã.
- Motto in English: Challenge the future
- Type: Private, non-profit
- Established: August 1, 1969; 56 years ago
- Affiliations: Society of Jesus
- Rector: Marcelo Fernandes de Aquino SJ
- Vice rector: José Ivo Follmann
- Academic staff: 900
- Students: 25,000
- Undergraduates: 23,000
- Postgraduates: 2,000
- Location: São Leopoldo, Rio Grande do Sul, Brazil
- Campus: Urban
- Colors: Blue, Orange, White and Black
- Website: www.unisinos.br

Unisinos (Portuguese: Universidade do Vale do Rio dos Sinos—literally "University of the Sinos River Valley") is a Brazilian private Jesuit university founded in 1969. Its main campus is located in Southern Brazil, in the city of São Leopoldo, state of Rio Grande do Sul (Sinos River valley region). Unisinos has more than 30,000 students in its 91 undergraduate programs, 19 academic master's programs, 6 professional master's programs, and 14 PhD programs, with six schools – Polytechnic, Business, Law, Health, Creative Industry, and Humanities.

Unisinos has a strategic orientation in Science, Technology, and Innovation with a global dimension. Unisinos' campus has a technological park, TECNOSINOS, which consists of 75 companies from 10 different countries, including the South Korean HT Micron and the German SAP Labs Latin America. Together, these companies are responsible for 6,000 direct job positions.

TECNOSINOS was selected as the best technological park in Brazil by ANPROTEC (National Association of Entities Promoting Innovative ventures) in 2010 and 2014. In 2014, its incubated company was named best in the world by SBPA Simulators. Academically, Unisinos ranks first among private undergraduate universities and second among private universities in Brazil.

Unisinos aerial view.

== History ==
In 1869, in São Leopoldo, Rio Grande do Sul state, the Jesuits founded Colégio Nossa Senhora da Conceição, the first official school in the state. The Cristo Rei School of Philosophy, Sciences and Literature was officially recognized in 1953. It was later named São Leopoldo School of Philosophy, Sciences and Literature. A century after its beginning, on July 31, 1969, the feast of Saint Ignatius of Loyola, Unisinos received official recognition as a university. It is part of a network of more than 200 Jesuit colleges and universities worldwide, with 2.2 million students.

== Museum of Geological History of Rio Grande do Sul ==
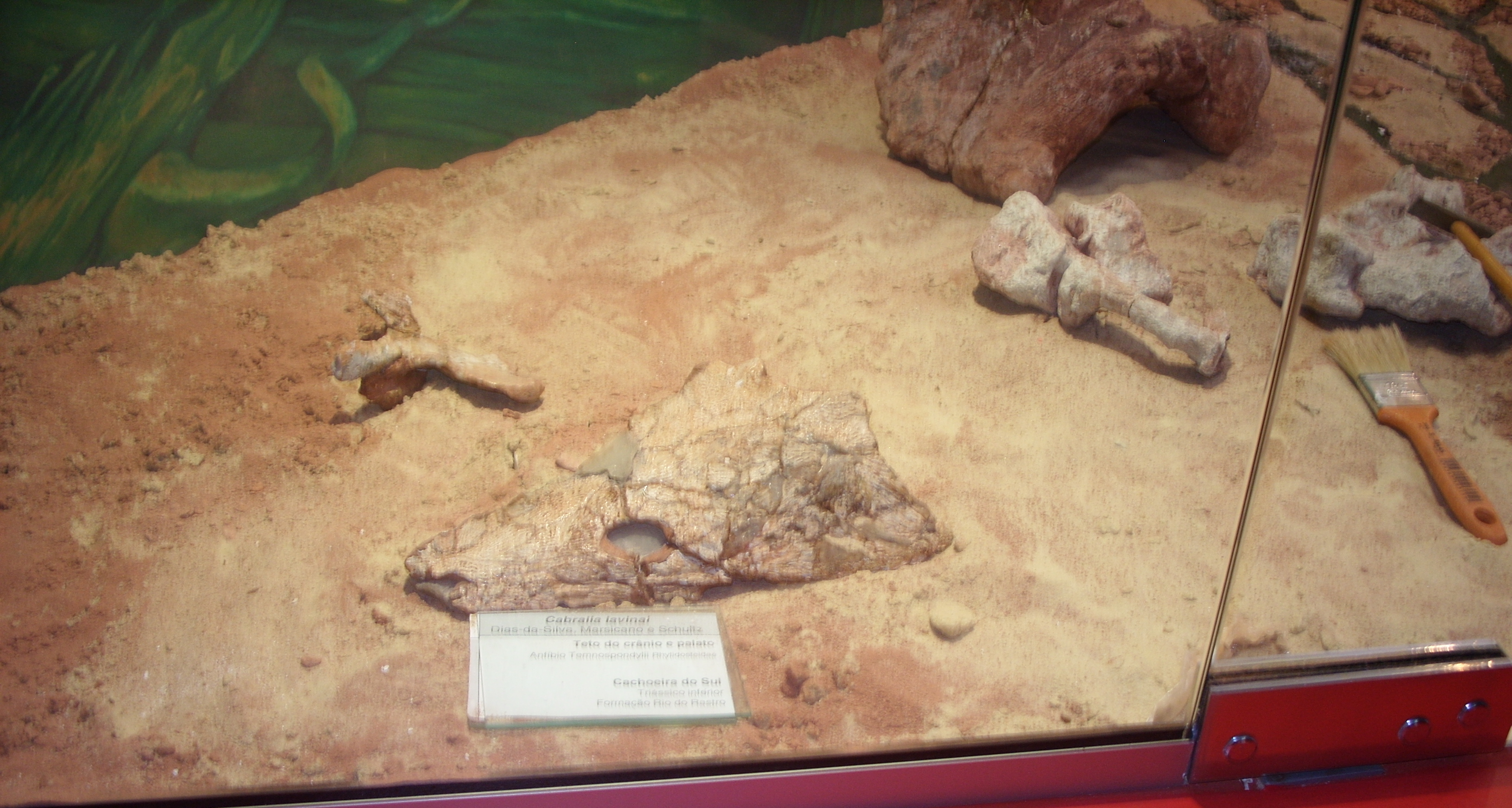
Sangaia lavinai in museum.

The museum was inaugurated on July 31, 2006, and is in Building 6 Unisinos. It contains samples of minerals, rocks and fossils that tell the early history of Rio Grande do Sul. It aims to recreate a part of the history of Rio Grande do Sul, told through more than 8000 objects brought from the Geopark of Paleorrota by professionals in the fields of geology and biology. These provide evidential knowledge for courses in geology and biology at this and other universities.

The university has contributed to the research and preservation of paleontological sites of geopark of Paleorrota.

== See also ==
- Paleorrota Geopark
- Brazil university rankings
- List of Jesuit sites
- Universities and higher education in Brazil
