= Tancredo Neves =

Prime minister of Brazil from 1961 to 1962

His Excellency Tancredo Neves
- Official portrait as Prime Minister, 1962

20th President-elect of Brazil
- In role 15 January 1985 – 21 April 1985
- Vice President: José Sarney (elect)
- Preceded by: João Figueiredo (1978)
- Succeeded by: Fernando Collor (1989)

Prime Minister of Brazil
- In office 8 September 1961 – 12 July 1962
- President: João Goulart
- Preceded by: Office established
- Succeeded by: Brochado da Rocha
Executive offices
Governor of Minas Gerais
In office 15 March 1983 – 14 August 1984
| Lieutenant | Hélio Garcia |
| Preceded by | Francelino Pereira |
| Succeeded by | Hélio Garcia |
Minister of Justice and Internal Affairs
In office 26 June 1953 – 24 August 1954
| President | Getúlio Vargas |
| Preceded by | Negrão de Lima |
| Succeeded by | Seabra Fagundes |
Legislative offices
Senator for Minas Gerais
In office 1 February 1979 – 15 March 1983
| Preceded by | Magalhães Pinto |
| Succeeded by | Alfredo Campos |
Member of the Chamber of Deputies
In office 3 February 1963 – 1 February 1979
| Constituency | Minas Gerais |
In office 30 August 1954 – 1 February 1955
| Constituency | Minas Gerais |
In office 12 March 1951 – 25 June 1953
| Constituency | Minas Gerais |
State Deputy of Minas Gerais
In office 1 August 1947 – 12 March 1951
| Constituency | At-large |
Bureaucratic offices
Director of the Rediscount Portfolio of Banco do Brasil
In office 17 November 1955 – 25 June 1958
| Preceded by | Augusto Mário Caldeira Brant |
| Succeeded by | Maurício Chagas Bicalho |

Personal details
- Born: 4 March 1910 São João del-Rei, Minas Gerais, Brazil
- Died: 21 April 1985 (aged 75) São Paulo, São Paulo, Brazil
- Party: See list: PP (1933–1934); PPM (1934–1937); PNM (1937–1945); PSD (1945–1965); MDB (1965–1979); PP (1980–1981); PMDB (1982–1985)
- Spouse: Risoleta Guimarães Tolentino (m. 1938)
- Children: 3
- Relatives: Aécio Neves (grandson)
- Education: UFMG Faculty of Law
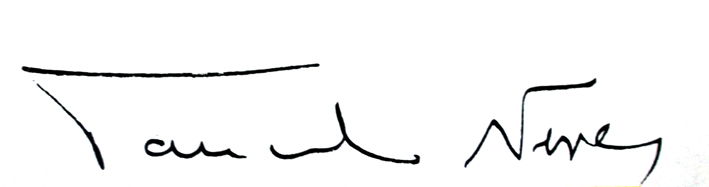
- Signature

Tancredo de Almeida Neves SFO (Portuguese pronunciation: [tɐ̃ˈkɾedu dʒi awˈmejdɐ ˈnɛvis]) (4 March 1910 – 21 April 1985) was a Brazilian politician, lawyer, and entrepreneur. He served as Minister of Justice and Internal Affairs from 1953 to 1954, President of the Council of Ministers from 1961 to 1962, Minister of Finance in 1962, and as Governor of Minas Gerais from 1983 to 1984. He was elected President of Brazil in 1985, but died before taking office; the vice-president-elect, José Sarney, took office as president in his place.

Neves began his political career with the Progressive Party of Minas Gerais, for whom he served as city councilman of São João del-Rei from 1935 to 1937. He received the majority of votes and became President of the Municipal Legislature. He was elected state representative (1947–1950) and congressman (1951–1953) as a member of the Social Democratic Party (PSD). He took office in June 1953, acting as Minister of Justice and Internal Affairs until the suicide of President Getúlio Vargas.

In 1954, Neves was elected congressman and served for one year. From 1956 to 1958 he was director of Banco de Crédito Real de Minas Gerais and President of Carteira de Redescontos of Banco do Brasil from 1956 to 1958. From 1958 to 1960 he headed the Department of Finance of Minas Gerais. Neves was nominated President of the Council of Ministers after President Jânio Quadros resigned and the introduction of the Parliamentary Regime in 1961 and was re-elected congressman in 1963.

He was a leader of the Brazilian Democratic Movement (MDB), a political party created on 27 October 1965 through the Institutional Act Number Two (AI-2) which abolished all existing parties and the institution of bi-partisanship. He was later re-elected congressman several times between 1963 and 1979. After the re-institution of a multiparty system, Neves became a senator as a member of the MDB in 1978 and founded the Popular Party (PP) with which he continued to serve until 1982. He joined the Brazilian Democratic Movement Party (PMDB) the following year and was elected governor of Minas Gerais where he served from 1983 to 1984. During this period, there was great political turmoil in favour of the movement known as Diretas Já, a civil action that mobilized the youth and proclaimed direct elections for president. But with the defeat of the "Dante de Oliveira amendment", which would have mandated direct elections for president in 1984, Neves was chosen to represent the Democratic Alliance, a coalition of opposition parties.

In 1984, Neves ran for president with the help of Ulysses Guimarães, and was elected President of Brazil on 15 January 1985 by the indirect voting of an electoral college. However, Neves fell gravely ill on the eve of his inauguration, 14 March 1985, and died 38 days afterwards. He died of diverticulitis and never assumed his position as president. While still ill, he was awarded the Grand Cross of the Military Order of the Tower and of the Sword, of the Valour, Loyalty and Merit. Although he died before taking his post as president, his name has been included in the gallery of Brazilian presidents according to law nº 7.465/1986, passed on the first anniversary of his death. Neves was the last Mineiro (from the State of Minas Gerais) President to be elected in the 20th century.

Neves was one of the most important Brazilian politicians in the 20th century and one of the major statesmen of Brazilian history. In July 2012 he was elected one of the 100 Greatest Brazilians of All Time in a competition organized by Sistema Brasileiro de Televisão (SBT) and the British Broadcasting Corporation (BBC).

== Early life and career ==
Tancredo Neves was born at 3:30 BRT on 4 March 1910 in São João del-Rei, Minas Gerais and was of mostly Portuguese, but also Austrian descent and graduated in law. The Neves family name comes from an Azorean great-great-grandfather. Tancredo Neves was a descendant of Amador Bueno, a noted paulista from the colonial Brazilian era.

His parents were Francisco de Paula Neves and Antonina de Almeida Neves. After completing studies in his hometown, he moved to Belo Horizonte and enrolled in Law School. He was a sympathizer of the Liberal Alliance that had brought Getúlio Vargas to power with the outbreak of the Revolution of 1930.

Neves studied at Colégio Santo Antônio, a Franciscan school, concluding his studies in humanities in 1927. In 1928 he began studies at the Universidade Federal de Minas Gerais where he obtained a bachelor's degree in Law, in 1932 and was a public prosecutor in 1933.

He began his political career as a member of the legislative chamber of his hometown in 1934, and was elected in 1947 to the Minas Gerais state legislature. Three years later he became a representative of his state in the Brazilian Chamber of Deputies. In 1953 he was appointed Minister of Justice by President Getúlio Vargas. Neves served in that post until Vargas committed suicide in 1954. In 1960, Neves ran unsuccessfully for governor of Minas Gerais.

Neves was married to Risoleta Guimarães Tolentino and they had three children. He received an honorary doctorate from the University of Coimbra, and was called "Doctor Tancredo" by his close colleagues. He is the grandfather of Aécio Neves, who was Minas Gerais's governor between 2003 and 2010 and is currently a senator.

== Early political career ==
During the Old Republic, Neves opposed Artur Bernardes, president of Brazil. He was launched into politics through the municipal political leader Augusto Viegas, to whom he remained grateful. In 1984, when asked about the political parties he belonged to by the newspaper Pasquim, he explained that he had chosen his parties, like everyone from Minas Gerais did, according to municipal issues.

He joined the Progressive Party (PP) of Minas Gerais, party which was formed by members of the Mineiro Republican Party, who supported the Revolution in 1930. Later, when the Progressive Party was extinct, he joined the Mineiro Nationalist Party.

Neves was not able to finance his candidacy as state representative in 1934, but he was elected São João del Rei's city councilman in 1935 and president of the City Council when he became the mayor. After the closure of the municipalities and the institution of the "New State" on 10 November 1937, Neves was the President of São João del Rei's Board of Councilmen.

After concluding his term of office as city councilman, Neves returned to advocacy and was an attorney for his city's railway union. He was also an entrepreneur in the textile sector for some time. According to the newspaper Pasquim, Governor Benedito Valadares invited him to become chief of police in Belo Horizonte, but declined, saying he would not serve dictatorships.

== State legislator and federal minister ==
Feeling pressured by the international conjuncture dictated by the imminent victory of the allies during World War II, and susceptible to internal pressure and contestation, President Getúlio Vargas cranked up a stratagem to liberate the New State. With that, the political framework that had been erected under auspicious democrats saw a new political college emerge.

On 8 April 1945, the Social Democratic Party (PSD) was created in Minas Gerais and was controlled by Benedito Valadares, who had been nominated as federal intervener of Minas Gerais on 15 December 1933. He governed until Getúlio Vargas was deposed on 29 October 1945. His fall opened way to the elections for president of the republic and for members of the National Constituent Assembly on 2 December of the same year. The Assembly proclaimed the new Constitution on 18 September 1946. Once the Constitution was in force, there were elections for state governor and members of the National Congress and state legislature in January 1947.

Neves was elected Minas Gerais's state representative by Benedito Valadare's PSD, and was designated as one of the spokesmen of the state Constitution of Minas Gerais. Once his work with the Constituent Assembly was over, he assumed leadership of the Social Democratic Party workbench and led the opposition to Milton Campos's government. Milton Campos was part of the National Democratic Union (UDN), which had reached the Liberty Palace after a split in the PSD of Minas Gerais. Due to a fire in the building of the old Legislative Assembly of Minas Gerais, very few documents of that Constituent Assembly were left intact.

He was elected congressman in 1950, and Juscelino Kubitschek was elected Governor of Minas Gerais, defeating situationist Gabriel Passos. In 1953, Kubitschek and Vargas agreed to appoint Neves minister of justice of Minas Gerais, a post which had to be filled by a delegate of the PSD of Minas Gerais. Neves left the parliamentary seat and began to serve as Minister of Justice on 26 June 1953. During his office, two laws were sanctioned, the Law 2.083 (the "Press Law") in 1953 and Law 2.252 on statutory rape.

As Minister of Justice during Vargas's administration, Neves offered to take on the Cabinet of War, which was responsible for arresting rebel military and to head the democratic resistance.

As Minister of Justice, he opened investigations into several cases of torture and exploitation of minors. He closed the Service of Assistance to Minors (SAM) after journalist Villas-Boas Corrêa's denunciation. He visited the location with the journalist in the middle of the night. He ordered that the doors be broken open, and they found inside the place dirty beds and girls who were "piled up as rags" and had injuries. Without hesitation, the very next day, Neves ordered the place to be closed for investigations and renovation.

He resigned as minister after Vargas's suicide on 24 August 1954, twenty days after the assault against journalist Carlos Lacerda. The incident resulted in the death of Major Rubens Florentino Vaz of the Brazilian Air Force, and generated a great political crisis. Café Filho then took office as President.

According to the Getúlio Vargas Foundation, Neves would have received a copy of Vargas's Testament-letter, which would be revealed at the time of his death. But, Leonel Brizola's version of the story is different, according to him, it was João Goulart who received it and who read it at Vargas's funeral in São Borja. Neves was giften a Parker-21 fountain pen by Vargas, since then been passed down to his grandson, Aécio Neves, former Governor of Minas Gerais.

Journalist Pedro Jorge de Castro narrated in his book Carlos Castelo Branco – Brazil's Journalist, the episode about the fountain pen, saying that once the meeting with the ministers was over, Vargas went up to his apartment at the Catete Palace and then turned to bid goodbye to Minister of Justice, Neves, and gave him the gold Parker-21 pen, and said before taking his life: "To the sure friend, in unsure times."

Benedito Valadares, Juscelino Kubitschek and Getúlio Vargas were Neves's main mentors in politics. Neves remained loyal to Vargas's memory, opposing João Café Filho's administration, and was one of the people who articulated Juscelino Kubitschek's candidacy as president, in the 1955 elections. Because he had not left his post in Vargas's ministry, Neves did not run for re-election as congressman in October 1954. He was nominated President of Credit Bank of Minas Gerais by Governor Clóvis Salgado da Gama.

In 1956 Juscelino Kubitschek nominated Neves for the carteira de redesconto (board of directors) of the Bank of Brazil, which he was a part of until 1958, when he was nominated secretary of Treasury under Bias Fortes's administration. Taking the post as Secretary of Finance, which he served until 1960, fact that stopped Neves from running the legislative elections in 1958. He then left the post in order to run for governor of Minas Gerais, but was defeated by José de Magalhães Pinto of the National Democratic Union.

== President of the Council of Ministers ==
President João Goulart and vice-president Ranieri Mazzilli at the inauguration of Tancredo Neves as President of the Council of Ministers, 1961

On 25 August 1961, Neves pronounced the installation of parliamentarism; therefore, preventing João Goulart from assuming the Presidency under a Military Coup. After more than a week of uncertainty, all the sectors directly involved in the crisis concluded that the solution to the dead-lock would have to be political and not military. So, with the developing negotiations, a constitutional amendment was presented, that would convert the presidencialist regime to a parliamentary one. This change greatly reduced the President's power, and was considered satisfactory by the military officers. Neves then travelled to Montevideo in order to obtain Goulart's agreement, and returned to Brasília on 1 September, having fulfilled his mission. The amendment was approved by Congress on the 2nd and opened way to Goulart's return, assuming the Presidency on 7 September, independence day.

On the following day, the new president sent a message to the National Congress (which was approved with 259 votes against 22), that designated Neves as President of the Council of Ministers, thus head of the brazilian government.

The first Council of Ministers aimed to build a vast political structure, and which was able to regain dialogue among the main parties of the country was composed by Antônio de Oliveira Brito Minister of Education, Armando Monteiro Filho Minister of Agriculture and Ulysses Guimarães, Minister of Industry and Commerce from the PSD; Francisco Clementino de San Tiago Dantas Minister of External Relations and Estácio Souto Maior Minister of Health from the PTB; Virgílio Távora Minister of Transportation and Gabriel Passos Minister of Mines and Energy from the National Democratic Union; André Franco Montoro Minister of Labor and Social Security from the party Partido Democrata Cristão (PDC); Walter Moreira Sales Minister of Finance; General João de Segadas Viana, Minister of War, Ângelo Nolasco de Almeida, Minister of the Navy and Brigadier Clóvis Monteiro Travassos, Minister of Air force.

Neves temporarily occupied the seat of the Ministry of Justice from 8 September to 13 October while he waited for the Social Progressive Party (PSP) which had former Governor of São Paulo, Adhemar Pereira de Barros as President, to indicate a name that would solidify his support to the parliamentary cabinet and replace him. Ademar suggested Congressman from the state of Goiânia, Alfredo Nasser, who accepted and assumed post, replacing Neves.

The program presented by the Cabinet to the Chamber on 28 September which was approved on that same day, was relatively generic in the way its terms had been formulated. The presentation of such program had the goal of fulfilling a formality that was inseparable from the nature of the new regime, rather than to determine a government policy per se. It defended the practice of periodical salary adjustments that were compatible with the expanding inflation indexes. The program complimented Operation Pan-American and pastoral pontifical Mater et Magistra. It approved the agrarian reform "as an essential first step towards the integration of countrymen into our economic life". And it proclaimed to be identified with an open-door policy towards foreign capital. The new government also defended the existence of a law that would control the transfer of profits abroad, as long as it did not discouraged foreign investors, considered vital to the defrayment of the national economic development.

The first parliamentary cabinet was formed during a serious politico-military crisis, but was able to decrease the rivalries between the main political chains in the country. However, the peoples' dissatisfaction continued to grow and their protests against high inflation and for larger salary adjustments, multiplied. The crisis that followed Jânio Quadros resignation had paralyzed the country for thirteen days, which only contributed to the increase of the economical crisis. The continuous dead-lock labor negotiations resulted in an explosion of successive strikes. Several of Petrobrás's units were ceased for forty days while Mining and Energy Minister, Gabriel Passos faced difficulties inside his own administration in trying to promote the replacement of Petrobras's president and director.

According to Neves, the parliamentary cabinet considered the agrarian reform "an issue of absolute priority on the government's agenda" and it helped the Minister of Agriculture create the commission that was in charge of evaluating and apprizing the studies and proposals on the issue. In January 1962, the government received an agrarian reform project from the senator of Minas Gerais', Senator Milton Campos, from the UDN. And a month later, the Department of Agriculture presented its own project. On 15 February the government created the National Council for Agrarian Reform, composed by Hélder Câmara (Auxiliary Bishop of Rio de Janeiro), Pombpeu Acióli Borges, Paulo Schilling, and Edgar Teixeira Leite who was responsible for defining the property areas to be reformed. Meanwhile, social tension was increasing in the interior, especially in the Northeast region. The assassination of the Farmers League President, João Pedro Teixeira (PB), started protest manifestations that were soon prohibited by Commander of the Army, General Artur da Costa e Silva. Neves attributed the turmoil generated by the countrymen to the existence of "an archaic rural structure" and took the initiative to propose political measures aimed at solving the problem, such as the Rural Union Plan, which was approved by the office council and largely expanded a contingent of sixteen million agricultural workers, including the illiterate.

During this period the escalation of the economic crisis was paired with the radicalization of the political struggles between currents that defended the so-called "base reforms" (constitutional, agrarian, urban, banking and tax reforms) and the conservative forces that opposed them, and accused the government of sponsoring social agitation. On 1 May 1962, Goulart gave a speech in Volta Redonda, in Rio de Janeiro, defending the urgency of reforms and the return of a presidencialist regime that would safeguard the actions of a strong and stable executive power. Therefore, the conservative sectors' mistrust in the government's intentions grew. In this context, Neves's cabinet – that was characterized by a policy that was committed to obtaining a large national consensus – started to lose the reason for its existence. On 6 June the cabinet, including the prime-minister, resigned in mass. Its members were then able to run for parliamentary elections in October of the same year, and Neves was elected congressman in Minas Gerais. When Neves reported to Congress, he highlighted that the estimated deficit was around 200 billion cruzeiros (former currency), but the forecast increase of the public service salaries would elevate the amount to 330 billion. During his term as congressman, Neves claimed to have had partial success in his goal of pacifying the national political mood.

Law 4.070 from 15 June 1962 that elevated Acre's territory to the category of State and Law 4.024 from 20 December 1961 which presented the first Foundation and Guidelines of National Education can be highlighted in the period of his office as President of the Council of Ministers.

== Opposition to the Military Regime ==
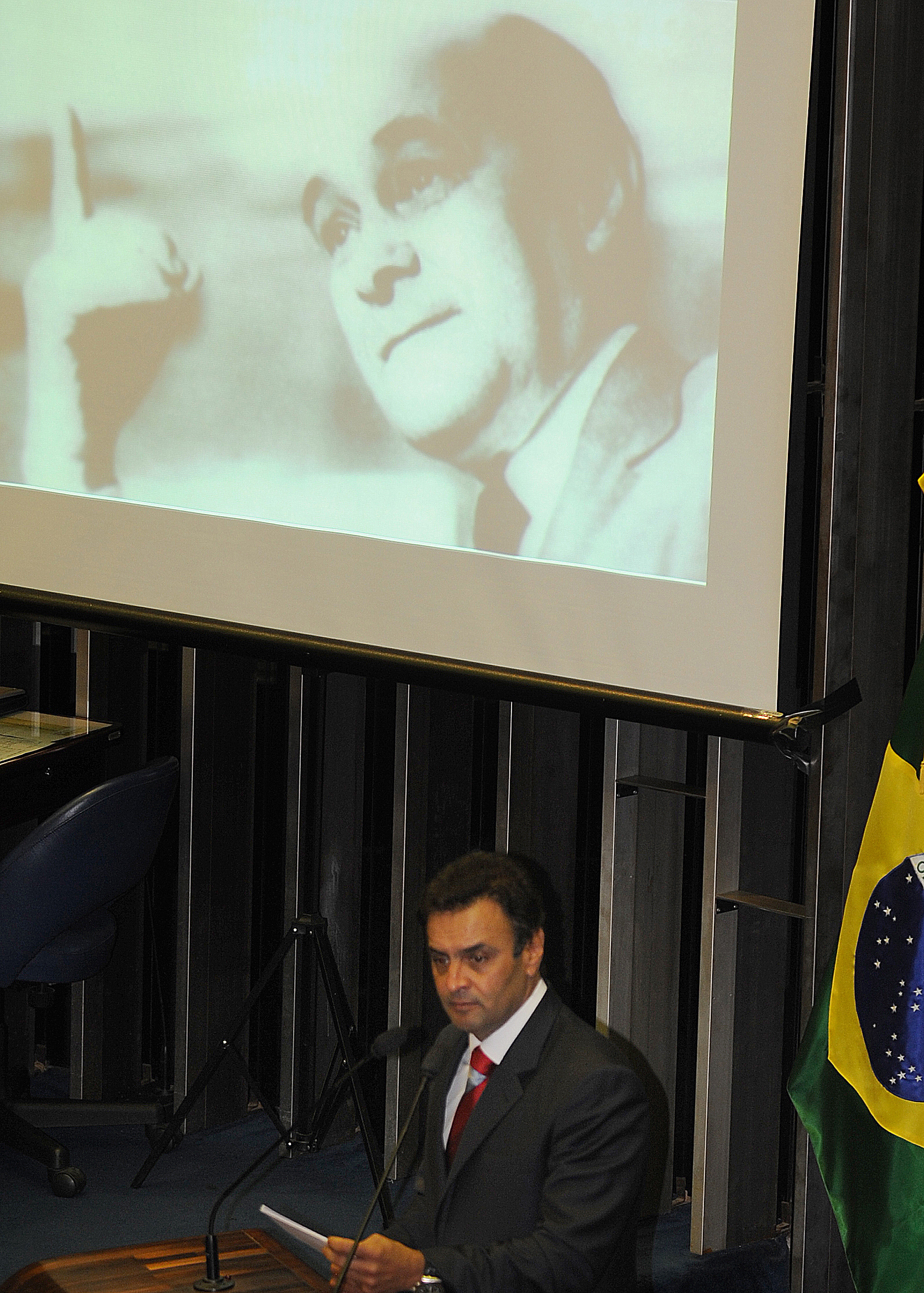
Aécio Neves giving a speech at the Chamber of Deputies in tribute to Tancredo Neves's 100th birthday

Back at the Chamber of Deputies, Tancredo maintained his support of João Goulart’s administration until he was deposed by the Military Coup in 1964. Tancredo was one of the few politicians who went to see João Goulart off at the Salgado Filho Airport, in Porto Alegre, when he left to Uruguay on exile. He was the only member of the Social Democratic Party who did not vote for General Humberto de Alencar Castelo Branco during the presidential elections by the National Congress on 11 April 1964. With the end of the existing multiparty system, José de Magalhães Pinto was invited to join the National Renewal Alliance, also known as ARENA. He politely declined the invitation due to the presence of his adversaries from the UDN, especially José de Magalhães Pinto from the new situationist college.

Although Neves had been João Goulart's prime minister and friend, he did not have his political rights annulled during the military coup thanks to his influence on the military.

Being a moderate objector of the military regime of 1964, Neves soon sought shelter in the Brazilian Democratic Movement (MDB). He was re-elected congressman in 1966, 1970 and 1974. During his parliamentary performance, he tried hard to avoid conflicts with the military government, and was part of MDB's moderate wing. He did not object to dialogue with the situacionist forces. That showed a posture that was contrary to the one the MDB's "authentic" wing had. In 1978 he was elected senator in Minas Gerais.

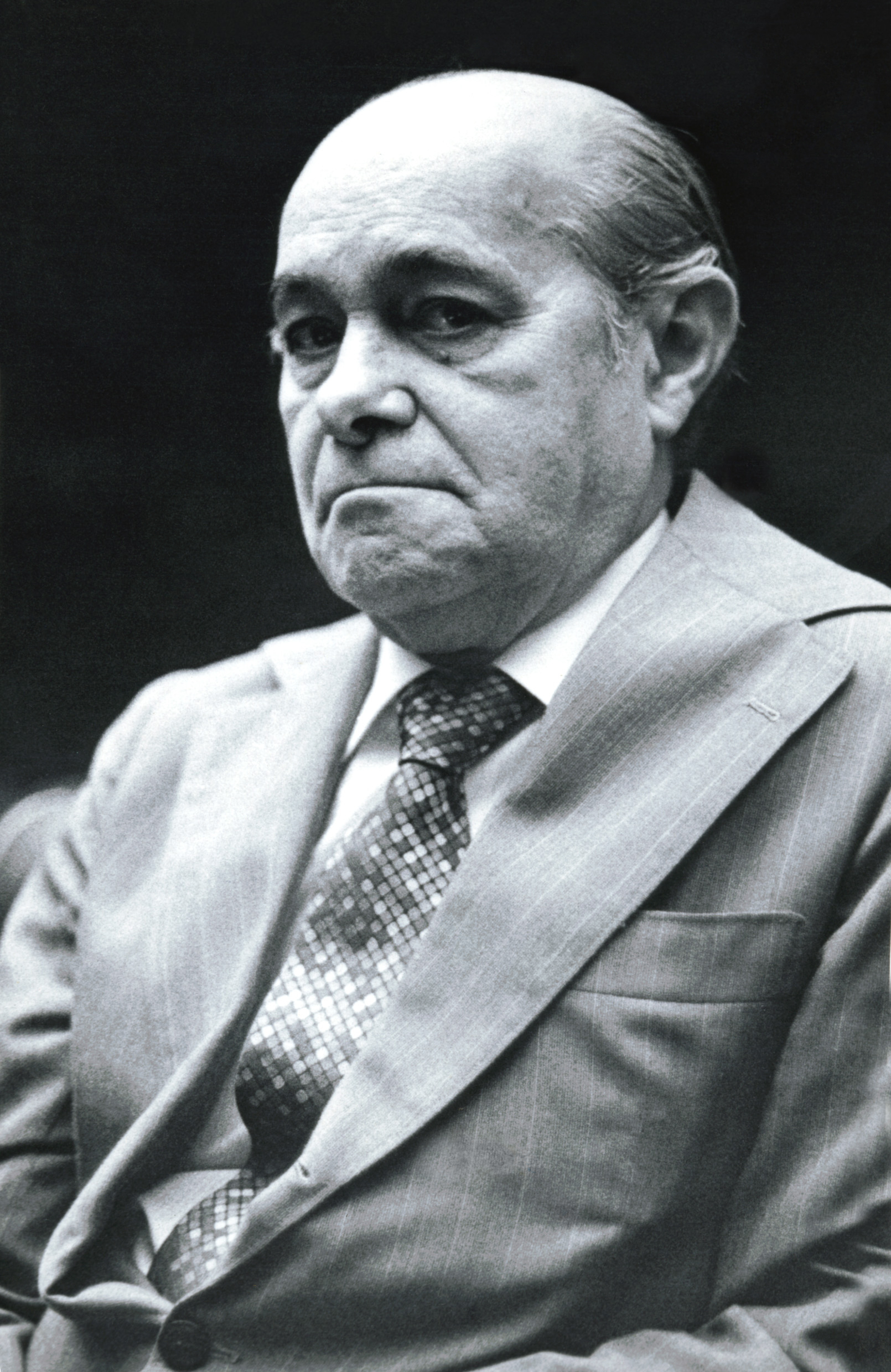
Neves in 1979, as senator of Minas Gerais

Neves founded the Popular Party in 1980 and was elected as its president. He did that by gathering moderates from the MDB and the ARENA around him, including his old rival José de Magalhães Pinto, during President João Goulart's administration which had recreated a multiparty system in 1979.

In 1980 Neves defended the incorporation of the Popular Party into the Brazilian Democratic Movement Party (PMDB) when faced with difficulties created by the electoral rules that would be applied in the 1982 elections. As a result, he was chosen as national vice-president of PMDB, and on that same year, was elected Governor of Minas Gerais after a tough dispute with Democratic Social Party candidate, Eliseu Resende. His running mate and Vice Governor, Hélio Garcia, gave him the support that was fundamental to his election. Garcia was very knowledgeable about the small counties in Minas Gerais, which Neves used to call "grotões". His victory did not come easily due to electoral statutes of the time which forecast the "attached vote" obligating citizens to vote for mayor, city councilman and governor of the same party. That favored the PDS, since it was a strong party in the small counties of Minas Gerais. During his inauguration ceremony as governor, he pronounced a phrase that became famous: "Mineiros, Minas Gerais's first priority is its own freedom".

He resigned the post as senator just a few days before assuming the Palácio da Liberdade, and was substituted by Alfredo Campos. He then nominated Hélio Garcia for Mayor of Belo Horizonte. Neves maintained his conciliatory stance even when in executive office, which guaranteed a good standing with the Federal Government. He renounced his seat as state governor on 14 August 1984 in order to run for presidency, and turned the government of Minas Gerais over to Hélio Garcia.

== "Diretas Já" and the Electoral College ==
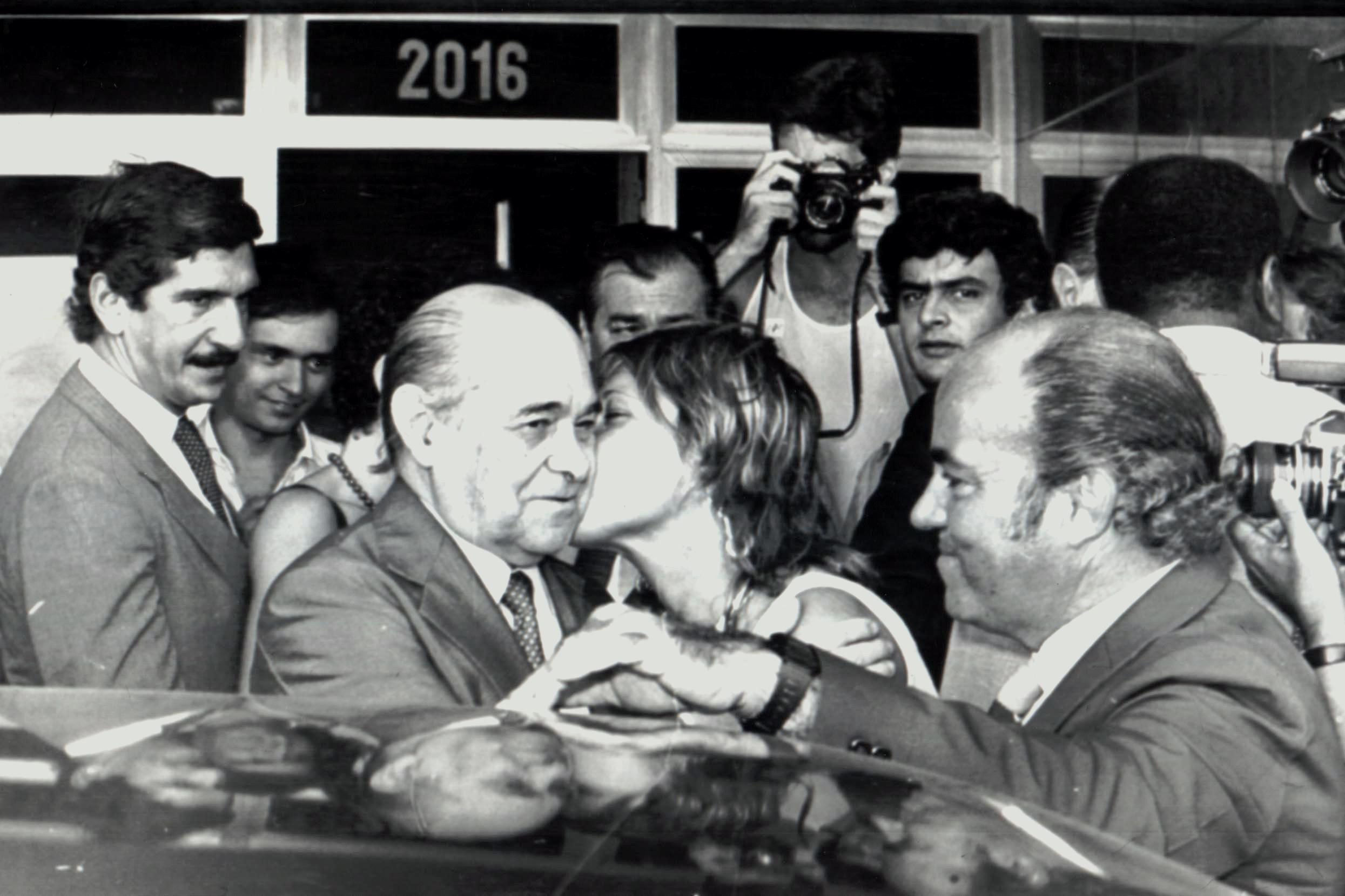
Neves in Brasília, 1984

On 15 March 1983, the elected governors took office, and debates around President João Figueiredo's succession began. During his address at the end of 1982, the President abdicated from coordinating debates around his succession, and put the issue in the hands of his party, the PDS. The lack of a consensus by the PDS in appointing a name denoted cracks in the governmental college. The college later appointed Mário Andreazza as Minister of Internal Affairs, Marco Maciel as senator, and Paulo Maluf as congressman, whom all brought a significant part of the PDS with them. Vice-president Aureliano Chaves immediately started having conflicts with President Figueiredo, and that only complicated the process of succession.

Talks towards Neves's candidacy as president began in 1983 when he received a visit led by José Fragelli who brought 15 senators from the PMDB with him. The group proposed his candidacy as president in the elections that were set by the Electoral College and scheduled for 15 January 1985.

In the beginning of that year, Fragelli organized a group of 14 senators, all of whom were willing to work for the presidential campaign, to visit Governor Neves. It was Senator Fragelli himself, who after this meeting told Senator Pedro Simon that if the PMDB decided to be part of the Electoral College, their candidate would then be Neves.

Other segments of the military regime opposition acted differently, and included the re-institution of direct presidential elections in their agenda. The opposition's first action took place in the county of Pernambuco, led by Mozart de Abreu e Lima, on the same day that the Military Regime completed its 19th year, 31 March 1983. The manifestations that occurred in the Northeast of Brazil resulted from a manifesto by the ten opposition governors (nine from the PMDB and one from the PDT), which demanded the re-establishment of direct presidential elections.

The very next day, a commission supporting the Diretas Já was formed in the capital of São Paulo and gathered ten thousand people. They were frustrated with the rejection of the constitutional amendment from 25 April 1984, called Dantes de Oliveira. Many other commissions were formed between January and April 1984 and were given the name "Direct Now Campaign".

In April 1984, Neves gathered with more than 1,500,000 people in the Vale do Anhangabaú in support of the Diretas Já movement. Neves was the first one to give a speech and received a massive applause when he said: "The time has come for us to free our nation from this confusion that has overtaken the country in the past twenty years". He then continued to defend the approval of Congress's amendment, stating that "those members of the parliament who voted against the amendment would have to leave Congress since they no longer represented the people's interests".

Senator José Sarney, President of the PDS, was very aware of the risks surrounding such a large fragmentation inside his party, so he proposed to his affiliates, the realization of a pre-election that would determine the candidate to the presidency. His proposal was quickly repelled by the "malufistas" who interpreted it as a way to derail the leader's candidacy. This fact led Sarney to leave the PDS presidency and to abandon his party a few days afterwards. He was later followed by Jorge Bornhausen, who also left the party.

Governors from the PMDB and Leonel Brizola from the Democratic Labour Party (Brazil) PDT announced their support of Neves as a candidate from the opposition in the elections of the Electoral College (that was composed of the National Congress and representatives from the Legislative Assemblies). In contrast, Aureliano Chaves and Marco Maciel were removed from the dispute, which left Paulo Maluf and Mário Andreazza as candidates. However, Maluf's victory led his opponents to support Neves.

After an agreement was made between the PMDB and a dissident movement from the PDS called Liberal Front, it was established that Neves would be the candidate for president, and that José Sarney (former ARENA member and who had left the PDS to join the PMDB) would be the candidate for vice-president. The Liberal Front emerged in 1984 from a divergence in the PMDB, party which later became the Liberal Front Party, today's Democrats. This dissident movement was ignited in the PDS when Paulo Maluf, former governor of São Paulo, won the internal dispute inside the PDS against Minister of Home Affairs, Mário Andreazza. Maluf was then chosen by the PDS to be their candidate for President against Neves, in the Electoral college on 15 January 1985.

Neves secretly wanted businessman Antônio Ermírio de Moraes to be vice-president. Ermírio de Moraes, born in a traditional family from Pernambuco, was business leader in São Paulo. His father, José Ermírio de Moraes had been senator through the Brazilian Labour Party (PTB) in Pernambuco and was a friend of Getúlio Vargas. His secret was revealed and the possibility of Antônio becoming vice-president was discarded in São Paulo.

The PMDB had minority seats in the Electoral college, and for that reason, it needed to gain votes from the PDS to be able to elect a president.

At that time, the candidates for president and vice-president had to be from the same party, and party coalitions where not allowed. Sarney was able to affiliate himself to the PMDB because he had been senator through the National Renewal Alliance Party (ARENA) in 1978, party which had been extinct since then. Therefore, his change in parties was not considered by the existing electoral rules, as an infidelity worthy of losing a mandate, since Sarney was not leaving a party by which he had been elected. This was not the case with Marco Maciel, who could not change parties since he had been elected senator in Pernambuco through the PDS in 1982. Aureliano Chaves could not be a candidate for president through the PMDB, even though he had been elected vice-president through the ARENA in 1978, since he had been the President as a substitute for João Figueiredo, becoming therefore, ineligible for president. Aureliano was also ineligible for vice-president because at the time, re-election was not allowed.

Neves was cast as candidate for having approval by the military and for being considered a moderate. In the military arena, the support that former President Ernesto Geisel offered was very decisive. But Neves's moderation was a target of criticism by the Workers' Party (PT), which did not accept the electoral college.

Neves also gained influence inside the Democratic Social Party PDS when meeting with governors of the Northeast (all nine of them were elected by the PDS and were, in majority, politicians from a new generation that admired Neves) during the meetings with the Superintendency for the Development of the Northeast. Minas Gerais belonged to the SUDENE because its North region was part of the drought area known as "Drought Polygon". Many of these governors moved to the Liberal Front that later became the Liberal Front Party (PFL). Among Neves's admirers, was former Governor of Bahia, Antônio Carlos Magalhães.

Antônio Carlos reacted to the statements made by Air force Minister, Délio Jardim de Matos, who said that whoever abandoned the PDS candidate was a traitor. In response, Antônio Carlos accused Délio Jardim of being such traitor. This was the first time that a minister form the military had been challenged during the Military Regime. From then on, the adherence to Neves only grew. The Baiano leader, Antônio Carlos, then added: "To betray the Revolution of 1964 is to support Maluf for president".

In an interview with the newspaper Pequim in 1984, Neves described Maluf as "symboliz[ing] all of the negative things the Revolution did in the last twenty years."

Even though they were indirect elections, Neves still did many rallies in public places. And, in a speech made during his campaign in the city of Vitória in November 1984, he said: "To restore democracy is to restore the republic, it is to build a new republic, mission which I have received from the people and which will become reality by the power of not only a politician, but by of all the Brazilian citizens".

The Military Regime ended in 1985 after João Figueiredo's administration was over. The expression "New Republic" became the way in which the period after 1985 became known in Brazilian politics.

The Neves-Sarney alliance was then made official and members of the opposition went on the road to defend their proposals in rallies that were as popular as the ones during the Diretas Já campaign.

Neves, who was hailed as a conciliation candidate, was elected president by the Electoral College in 1985. He received 480 votes while Maluf received 180 votes and there were 26 abstentions. The majority of these abstentions came from parliamentarians from the Workers' Party. They disobeyed the guidance given by their party and were then removed from it for having voted in Neves. As a result, Congressmen Aírton Soares, José Eudes and Bete Mendes were expelled from the PT.

When the results from the elections were announced on 15 January 1985, Neves said on a speech: "Let us not be dispersed. Let us remain united as we were on public squares, with the same emotion, the same dignity and the same decision. As Tiradentes, that hero crazed by hope, used to say almost 200 years ago, we can make this country a great nation. Let's do that!" His victory was received enthusiastically by the population, and is still considered today as one of the most complex and successful works of "political ingenuity" in the history of Brazilian politics.

Soon after, the Workers' Party and the Central Única dos Trabalhadores (CUT) started making opposition to Neves. On 11 February 1985 edition of the newspaper Jornal da Tarde there was a headline that read: "The CUT and the PT declared war against Tancredo".

At the end of 1984 the polls showed that Neves had won the majority of the Electoral College. Fearing a maneuver from João Figueiredo that would extend his mandate two more years, and would establish direct elections for his successor, Neves went live on TV and declared that Maluf would waive his candidacy. Maluf reacted by guaranteeing that he would not. And so, with Maluf firmly planted in the dispute, João Figueiredo and the PDS were unable to change the rules of the successor's game.

As soon as Neves was elected, he made an international excursion where he met with several heads of state in the attempt of gaining support for his office, which was being considered uncertain. He only agreed to have surgical operation after several Heads of state had arrived in Brasília for his inauguration. The meetings with heads of state were a strategic move by Neves to make the process of re-democratization irreversible. Neves's maneuvers were so successful that they made even Ulysses Guimarães (referred to as "Mr. Diretas") abdicate his dispute in order to support him. Their political agreement had included Neves's future support of Guimarães in the next elections that would replace him and would be direct elections. This way, Guimarães gave up his candidacy to Neves.

== Illness and death ==
Neves had undertaken a very strenuous campaign agenda. He gathered the support of Congress and state governors, and travelled abroad as the elected president. He had been suffering strong abdominal pain during the days preceding his inauguration. Advised by his doctors to seek treatment, he said: "You can do whatever you want with me... after I take office." Neves feared that military hardliners would refuse to give power to the Vice President. He decided to only announce his illness on the day of his inauguration, 15 March 1985 after the heads of state who were supposed to be present had arrived in Brasília. That would have made it harder for a political rupture to occur. His concern with the assurance of the inauguration was echoed by the phrase he had heard from Getúlio Vargas regarding the subject: "It is not enough to win elections in Brazil, it is necessary to take office!"

In Brasília, during the religious ceremony at the Dom Bosco Sanctuary, he developed strong continuous abdominal pain. In the hospital, he told his cousin Francisco Dornelles – who had been appointed as Finance Minister – that he would refuse surgery if he didn't have the guarantee that outgoing President João Figueiredo would induct José Sarney. Dornelles promised his cousin that Sarney would be inducted. According to information compiled by the Getúlio Vargas Foundation, the maneuvers to bring Sarney to office were already under Ulysses Guimarães (President of the Chamber, PMDB-SP), and Leitão de Abreu's Chief of Staff of Brazil lead.

The official version said that Neves had diverticulitis, though later reports indicated that he had a benign but infected leiomyoma. The existence of a tumor was hidden by the doctors until the last minute, due to the possible impact that the word cancer would have during that age.

On 15 March, newly sworn in Vice President José Sarney assumed presidential powers and duties as acting president before the National Congress while Neves recovered. He read the statement that Neves had written for his inauguration, preaching national conciliation and the installation of a constituent national assembly. It read: The ceremony to transfer power took place at the Palácio do Planalto. President Figueiredo did not appear, refusing to give the presidential sash on to José Sarney since he was a substitute and not his elected successor. It was the official photographer of the palace, Gervézio Batista, who put the sash around Sarney.

On 28 June 1985 Sarney fulfilled the promise Neves had made during his campaign, to bring Message 330, which called for the convening of a new Constituent Assembly, to National Congress. This resulted in passage of Constitutional Amendment 26 on 27 November 1985. New constituents were chosen on 15 November 1986 and later took office on 1 February 1987, readily initiating the elaboration of the new Constitution of Brazil in 1988.

There was great tension at the time due to the possibility of the growing democratic opening being interrupted. In the event of Sarney not taking office, President of Chamber of Deputies, Ulysses Guimarães, would. Guimarães belonged to the PMDB and was not well accepted by the members of the military. The biggest risk was that the more conservative sectors of the military, the so-called "hardliners", were trying to destabilize the re-democratization process to maintain the Brazilian military government in power.

On the eve of 15 March, Guimarães, Fernando Henrique Cardoso (future President of Brazil), Sarney and the Minister of the Army Leônidas Pires Gonçalves had a meeting. During the meeting, Gonçalves's interpretation of the 1967 Constitution prevailed, and so, the National Congress decided on Sarney.

The Hospital da Base in Brasília was undergoing restoration when Neves was admitted, and had no ICU; this contributed to complications after Neves's surgery, and his health declined. He was transferred to the Hospital das Clínicas da Universidade de São Paulo in São Paulo. Neves had seven surgeries, and died of a generalized infection at 22:23 BRT on 21 April (same date as Tiradentes's death), at the age of 75. Rumors at the time said that Neves had been dead for days, and that his death had been concealed while a new government presided by Sarney could be formed and so the date of his death would coincide with Tiradentes's death.

There was great commotion in the nation, especially because Neves was the first civilian elected president since 1960, when Jânio Quadros was elected. He was also the first politician from the military opposition to be elected president since the military coup of 1964.

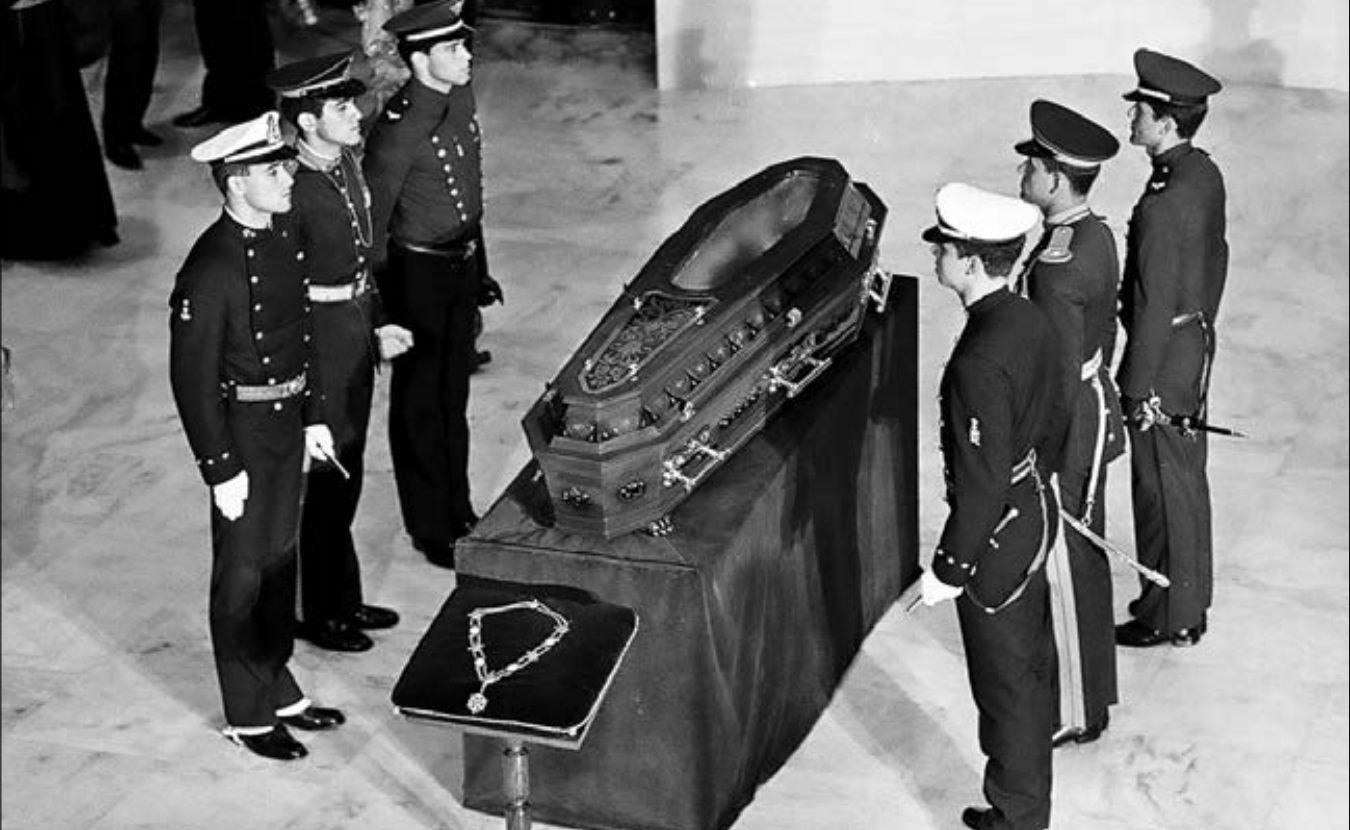
Six officers from the army, navy, and air force form a guard of honour around Neves's coffin during his state funeral, 24 April 1985

Neves's funeral was one of the largest funerals in Brazil's history. It was estimated that between São Paulo, Brasília, Belo Horizonte and São João del Rei, more than two million people saw the coffin in procession. Mineiro singer Milton Nascimento sang "Coração de Estudante" to mark the occasion. The elected president foresaw an epitaph during a conversation with a group of friends in the Senate: "Here lies Tancredo Neves unwillingly". It was never engraved on the tombstone that was placed beside the St. Francis of Assisi Church at the cemetery in São Paulo. His burial in São João del Rei was broadcast on national TV. Guimarães gave a speech before his grave, which was grave number 85 (in remembrance of the year of his election and death). There is a commemorative plaque at the cemetery from the President of France, François Mitterrand, who had met Neves during his visit to Europe.

In March 2008, Neves's grave was vandalized and the marble piece from the upper part of the tomb was broken. He was honored in São João del Rei with the installation of his statue placed next to the statue of Tiradentes In 2012, Neves's children requested a Habeas Data from the Federal Justice in Brasília. The Federal Medicine Council and the Regional Council of the State of Distrito Federal would have to render them all of the investigations, ethical-disciplinary inquiries, documents, and doctor's testimonials relative to the care delivered to the president.

The Neves family is represented by Historian and Researcher, Luís Mir, author of the book The Patient, The Tancredo Neves Case, and by attorneys Juliana Porcaro Bisol, Bruno Prenholato and Cláudia Duarte. According to them, the requested documentation will allow for a historical investigation of what really happened, especially because it would contain the identification of the doctors responsible for the President's treatment.

== Legacy and tributes ==
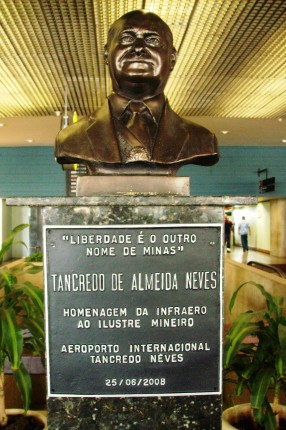
Monument in tribute to Neves

Twenty years after his death, the medical body of the Hospital da Base in Brasília revealed that they had not announced the correct report at that time, and that Neves's medical condition had not been diverticulitis, but a tumor. Although it was benign, the discovery of a tumor could have been interpreted as cancer back then. That would have caused unpredictable effects on the political development of that time.

The Vice President of the time, José Sarney, took office as President, bringing an end to the period of five governments that had been conducted by members of the Military.

Even without taking office, Neves is, by law, counted amongst the former Presidents of Brazil, by law 7.465, of 21 April 1986: "Citizen Tancredo de Almeida Neves, elected and not vested due to his death, will be figured in the gallery of those who have been anointed by the Brazilian nation, to the Supreme Justice, under all legal matters".

In 1990, the Tancredo Neves Memorial was opened in his hometown São João del Rei, where a narration of his personal and political journey can be found.

On 1 March 2010, a special stamp was created to celebrate Neves's 100th birthday. This event was part of a series of tributes that took place until his birth date, 4 March. During a tribute to his 100th birthday in Brasília, his bust was inaugurated in the Senate Noble Hall. He is remembered as "a conciliating and an able political articulator".

A city in Bahia was named Presidente Tancredo Neves in his honor. And, the capital of Bahia, Salvador, has its business and finance centers on Avenida Tancredo Neves. Tancredo Neves International Airport in Belo Horizonte is named for him. The Tancredo Neves Bridge connects the Brazilian city of Foz do Iguaçu with the Argentine Puerto Iguazú, crossing over the Iguassu River.

Neves wrote not only articles for newspapers such as Estado de Minas, O Correio and Diário de São João del Rei, but he was also author of The Parliamentary Regime and Brazil's Reality and The World Scene and National Security, published in the magazine Revista Brasileira de Estudos Políticos. He also wrote numerous speeches and opinions that were published in newspapers, magazines and parliamentary annuals.

On 24 February 1983 he took seat 12 in the Minas Gerais Academy of Arts having been sponsored by Alvarenga Peixoto to replace Alberto Donato.

He left two testimonials that were featured on books. The first book was written based on an interview he had given his niece, Lucília de Almeida Neves. It was titled Tancredo Neves, the Trajectory of a Liberal, and narrated his political trajectory until 1954 only, because he stopped the interview there in order to focus completely on the elections in the Electoral College that was taking place in 1985. The second interview-turned-book was titled Tancredo talks about Getúlio, where he gave testimonials about the late president, and his own political actions beside him.

A feature film and a biography were made about Neves's life. The film by João Batista de Andrade was titled A Céu Aberto, and the biography Tancredo Neves, the Trajectory of a Liberal was written by his niece Lucília de Almeida Neves Delgado and Vera Alice Cardoso. In 2011, the documentary titled Tancredo – The Crossing by Silvio Tendler was released.

In 2010, the book titled The Patient - the Tancredo Neves Case by Luís Mir was released. The book gathers documents obtained at Hospital da Base in Brasília and from the Heart Institute of Hospital das Clínicas da Universidade de São Paulo in São Paulo, where Neves died. The book shows a surgical guide that better explains his surgeries, and has testimonials from the specialists involved. It reveals what happened behind the scenes of the clinical case that altered the path of Brazilian democracy and shook the reputation of doctors in the country.

At the end of 2010, Minas Gerais Governor Aécio Neves, inaugurated the new branch of the State Government, denominated Administrative City Tancredo Neves.

In 2013, the Tancredo Neves Memorial was inaugurated in Brasília. It is located on the Panteão da Pátria in the Praça dos Três Poderes. The space features videos, digital media and original documents portraying steps of the period of the re-democratization of Brazil. It also showcases some of Neves's speech manuscripts, letters written by him and to him by personalities such as Juscelino Kubistchek and João Goulart, as well as material from the Diretas Já campaign, and his certificate as President.

== Family ==
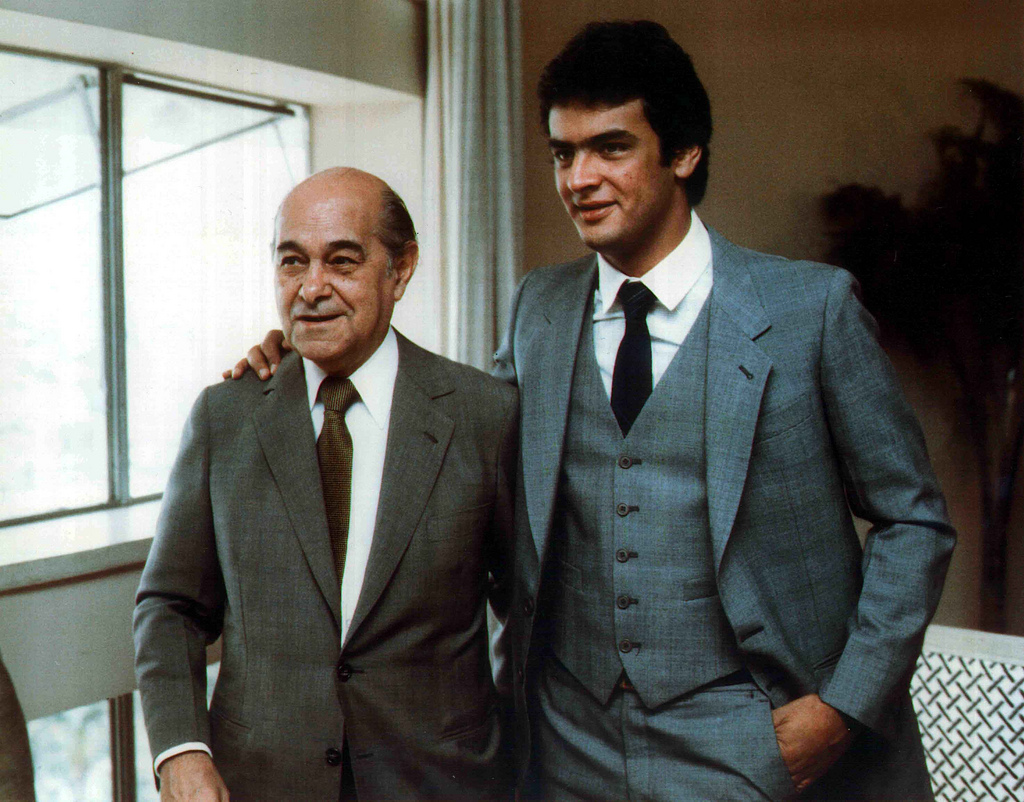
Neves (then Governor of Minas Gerais) with his maternal grandson Aécio in 1983

On 25 May 1938, Neves married Risoleta Guimarães Tolentino (20 July 1917 – 21 September 2003) with whom he had three children; one of them, Inês, married politician Aécio Ferreira da Cunha. Their son is the politician Aécio Neves.

Political offices
| Preceded by Negão de Lima | Minister of Justice and Interior Affairs; 1953–1954; 1961 (interim) | Succeeded by Miguel Seabra Fagundes |
| Preceded by José Martins Rodrigues | Minister of Justice and Interior Affairs; 1953–1954; 1961 (interim) | Succeeded by Alfredo Nasser |
| Preceded by Walter Moreira Salles | Acting Minister of Finance; 1962 | Succeeded by Walter Moreira Salles |
| Position re-established | Prime Minister of Brazil; 1961–1962 | Succeeded by Brochado da Rocha |
| Preceded by Francelino Pereira | Governor of Minas Gerais; 1983–1984 | Succeeded by Hélio Garcia |
| Preceded by João Figueiredo | President-elect of Brazil; 1985 | Succeeded by José Sarney |
Party political offices
| New political party | PMDB nominee for President of Brazil; 1985 (won) | Succeeded by Ulysses Guimarães (lost) |
