= Diretas Já =

1984 Brazilian civil movement

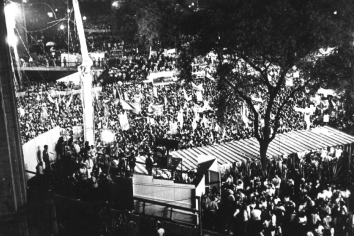
- Diretas Já demonstration in São Paulo on April 16, 1984.
- Date: March 1983 – April 1984
- Location: Major cities throughout Brazil
- Participants: Tancredo Neves, Leonel Brizola, Miguel Arraes, Ulysses Guimarães, André Franco Montoro, Dante de Oliveira, Mário Covas, Gérson Camata, Iris Rezende, Orestes Quércia, Luiz Inácio Lula da Silva, Eduardo Suplicy, Roberto Freire, Fernando Henrique Cardoso among others.
- Outcome: Indirect election of Tancredo Neves and approval of a Constituent Assembly

Diretas Já (Portuguese pronunciation: [dʒiˈɾɛtɐz ˈʒa], Direct (Elections) Now) was a civil movement in Brazil which demanded direct presidential elections.

== Participants ==
The movement brought together diverse elements of Brazilian society. Participants came from a broad spectrum of political parties, trade unions, civil, student and journalistic leaderships. Politicians involved included Ulysses Guimarães, Tancredo Neves, André Franco Montoro, Fernando Henrique Cardoso, Mário Covas, Teotônio Vilela, Dante de Oliveira, José Serra, Luiz Inácio Lula da Silva, Eduardo Suplicy and Leonel Brizola. The movement also included artists such as Milton Nascimento, Fernanda Montenegro, Gilberto Gil, Bruna Lombardi, Fafá de Belém, and Chico Buarque de Holanda. Journalists such as Henfil, Osmar Santos and Eliel Ramos Maurício covered the assemblies for periodicals Diário de Sorocaba and Folha de Itapetininga. Football team Corinthians, already well known for activism with their Corinthians Democracy movement, printed "Diretas Já" on the back of their jerseys. Sectors of the Catholic Church, as well as other religions, also supported the movement.

== First public protest ==
The first public protest for the Diretas occurred in the emancipated town of Abreu e Lima, in Pernambuco, on March 31, 1983. Periodicals of the state of Pernambuco organized members of the PMDB party in the city, followed by protests in the capital of the state of Goiás, Goiânia, on June 15, 1983, as well as the Charles Miller Plaza, in front of Pacaembu Stadium, on November 27, 1983, in São Paulo.

== Economic situation ==
The growth of the movement coincided with a deepening economic crisis, with an annual inflation of 239% in 1983. This led to the mobilization of class entities and unions. The movement linked representatives from diverse political backgrounds under the common cause of direct elections for president. Many pro-status quo politicians, sensitive to their base, had also formed a block of disagreement within the National Renewal Alliance Party (ARENA), the pro-government party, when the Democratic Social Party (PDS) was founded.

The following year, the movement gained critical mass and was able to mobilize openly. On the anniversary of the city of São Paulo (January 25), the first major assembly of the campaign for direct elections for president took place on Praça da Sé, a major public square adjacent to the São Paulo Cathedral, was made possible by André Franco Montoro, governor of São Paulo.

By this time the Military Regime had lost much prestige with the majority of the population. Low ranking members of the military, whose wages had fallen in real terms due to inflation, began voicing their discontent to their superiors.

On April 16, shortly before the vote in Congress which would enable direct elections for president, a final demonstration took place in São Paulo in the Anhangabaú Valley, where an estimated crowd of over 1.5 million people attended, in the largest political demonstration ever seen in Brazil.

During April 1984, President Figueiredo increased press censorship and promoted arrests and police violence. Nonetheless, a vote on the Diretas Já amendment (known as Dante de Oliveira law, after its author) took place on April 25, 1984. Despite 298 votes in favor, with 65 against, 112 pro-government deputies abstained, leaving the Chamber without a quorum, as a result of which the bill died.

Despite the bill's failure, the movement became a catalyst for various opposition forces and a voice for popular discontent. The re-democratization process ended with the return of civil power in 1985 and the approval of a new constitution in 1988, which called for the direct presidential elections in 1989, which were won by Fernando Collor de Mello, the first democratically elected president since 1961.

== Assemblies ==
This is a partial list in chronological order of the Diretas Já demonstrations:

| Date | Location | Number of participants | Notes |
|---|---|---|---|
| March 31, 1983 | Abreu e Lima, Pernambuco | — | As the first public event of Diretas Já, the number of participants was not high. |
| June 15, 1983 | Goiânia, Goiás | 5,000 | It took place on Praça do Bandeirante. |
| June 26, 1983 | Teresina, Piauí | — | — |
| August 12, 1983 | Pernambuco | — | It took place in several cities of the state. |
| November 27, 1983 | São Paulo, São Paulo | 15.000 | On this date, Senator Teotônio Vilela died. |
| December 9, 1983 | Ponta Grossa, Paraná | 1.000 | — |
| January 5, 1984 | Olinda, Pernambuco | — | — |
| January 12, 1984 | Curitiba, Paraná | 40,000 | This event included the participation of Juan Carlos Quintana, an alleged spokesman of Raúl Alfonsín. It was later discovered that he was an agent of the dictatorship, who infiltrated in order to give the impression that the movement began under international influence. |
| January 20, 1984 | Salvador, Bahia | 15,000 | — |
| January 21, 1984 | Vitória, Espírito Santo | 10,000 | — |
| January 21, 1984 | Campinas, São Paulo | 12,000 | — |
| January 25, 1984 | São Paulo, São Paulo | 300,000 | It took place on Praça da Sé. |
| January 26, 1984 | João Pessoa, Paraíba | 10,000 | — |
| January 27, 1984 | Olinda, Pernambuco | 30,000 | — |
| January 29, 1984 | Maceió, Alagoas | 20.000 | It took place on Praia da Pajuçara. |
| February 16, 1984 | Belém, Pará | 60,000 | — |
| February 16, 1984 | Rio de Janeiro, Rio de Janeiro | 60,000 | It was the first march of the Diretas, going from Candelária to Cinelândia. |
| February 17, 1984 | Recife, Pernambuco | 12,000 | A march took place. |
| February 18, 1984 | Manaus, Amazonas | 6,000 | — |
| February 19, 1984 | Capão da Canoa, Rio Grande do Sul | 50,000 | A march took place. |
| February 19, 1984 | Osasco, São Paulo | 25,000 | — |
| February 19, 1984 | Rio Branco, Acre | 7,000 | — |
| February 20, 1984 | Cuiabá, Mato Grosso | 15,000 | — |
| February 24, 1984 | Belo Horizonte, Minas Gerais | 300,000 | — |
| February 26, 1984 | São Paulo | — | Public events in 300 cities of the state. |
| February 26, 1984 | Aracaju, Sergipe | 30,000 | — |
| February 29, 1984 | Juiz de Fora, Minas Gerais | 30,000 | — |
| March 8, 1984 | Anápolis, Goiás | 20,000 | — |
| March 21, 1984 | Rio de Janeiro, Rio de Janeiro | 200, 000 | Another march took place, from Candelária to Cinelândia. |
| March 22, 1984 | Campinas, São Paulo | 20,000 | It was only a music concert, without any political speeches. |
| March 23, 1984 | Uberlândia, Minas Gerais | 40,000 | — |
| March 24, 1984 | Campo Grande, Mato Grosso do Sul | 40,000 | — |
| March 29, 1984 | Florianópolis, Santa Catarina | 20,000 | It took place outside the same church where the Novembrada, a confrontation between the military police and students, had occurred four years earlier. |
| April 2, 1984 | Londrina, Paraná | 50,000 | — |
| April 6, 1984 | Natal, Rio Grande do Norte | 50,000 | — |
| April 7, 1984 | Petrolina, Pernambuco | 30,000 | — |
| April 10, 1984 | Rio de Janeiro, Rio de Janeiro | 1,000,000 | It took place outside the Candelária Church. |
| April 12, 1984 | Goiânia, Goiás | 300,000 | It took place on Praça do Bandeirante. |
| April 13, 1984 | Porto Alegre, Rio Grande do Sul | 200,000 | — |
| April 16, 1984 | São Paulo, São Paulo | 1,500,000 | A march from Praça da Sé to Vale do Anhangabaú followed the event. It was the largest public demonstration in the history of Brazil at that time. |

== See also ==
- 1964 Brazilian coup d'état
- History of Brazil (1964–1985)
