= 1985 Brazilian presidential election =

- 15 January 1985

686 members of the electoral college 344 electoral votes needed to win
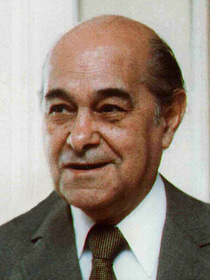

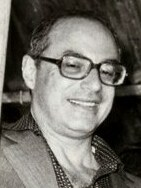
Candidate	Tancredo Neves	Paulo Maluf
Party	MDB	PDS
Running mate	José Sarney	Flávio Marcílio
Electoral vote	480	180
Percentage	72.73%	27.27%
President before election
João Figueiredo
PDS
Elected President
Tancredo Neves
(died before taking office)
MDB

Presidential elections were held in Brazil on 15 January 1985, the last to be held indirectly through an electoral college, and the last to be held under the military regime. The electoral college system was put in place so that the military elite that controlled the government could secure the election of the candidate chosen by the High Command of the Armed Forces as president. However, in 1985, due to the process of negotiated transition to democracy that started in the late 1970s, the politicians in the electoral college were placed under no coercion, and were allowed to choose the president of their choice.

Although Tancredo Neves of the Brazilian Democratic Movement Party was elected president, he became seriously ill one day before his inauguration and subsequently died, resulting in his running mate José Sarney becoming president.

== Background ==
Under the 1967–1969 constitution enacted by the military, the electoral college was composed of all the members of the Brazilian bicameral National Congress (formed by Senators and Federal Deputies) and also of a number of State Deputies who were especially elected by their peers in the State Assemblies for the purpose of serving as delegates of those Assemblies in the electoral college. The 1982 legislative elections had already taken place under the process of gradual restoration of democratic freedoms, and the opposition had a slim majority of seats in the Chamber of Deputies, but the governing party, allied with the Military Regime, still controlled the Senate (only a fraction of the composition of the Senate had been up for election in 1982, other senators had been elected indirectly in the late 1970s).

Two groups were disputing the succession of President João Figueiredo: the Democratic Alliance and the Democratic Social Party. The Democratic Alliance, which advocated the restoration of democracy through the creation of a new Constitution, launched the candidacy of Tancredo Neves from the Brazilian Democratic Movement (MDB). The MDB led the Alliance and was supported by the Liberal Front Party, a dissidence of the Democratic Social Party, and the Democratic Labour Party.

The Democratic Social Party, on the other hand, defended the legacy of the 1964 military regime, and launched the candidature of Paulo Salim Maluf, also a civilian, but one that was aligned with the military elite that controlled the regime.

The supporters of the regime, however, were weakened: they had even rebranded their party as the Democratic Social Party, abandoning the old name ARENA (National Renewal Alliance) in order to confuse voters at legislative elections and thus avoid a massive loss of seats. Also, in the nomination of the PDS's presidential candidate, Colonel Mário Andreazza was the preferred candidate of outgoing President General João Figueiredo, but the membership of the PDS was no longer disciplined: former São Paulo Governor Paulo Maluf defeated Andreazza in the Party's Convention, resulting in a split in the PDS. After Maluf's nomination, many members left the Party and joined the Opposition MDB (including José Sarney, who went on to become Tancredo Neves's running mate in a political deal that secured for the Opposition the votes of the electoral college members who defected from the PDS and joined the MDB).

In 1984, the Diretas Já movement, that sought the immediate restoration of direct popular elections for the Presidency of the Republic, failed, since, in spite of strong popular support and rallies, the Opposition to the military government failed to secure the two-thirds supermajority of votes in Congress, that was required to amend the 1967 Constitution, as amended and republished in 1969.

== Results ==
On 15 January 1985 the Electoral College gathered to vote. Tancredo Neves was elected president with 480 votes (73%) against only 180 (27%) given to Maluf. There were 26 abstentions, mostly from parliamentarians from the Workers' Party, which decided to maintain a neutral stance and support neither candidate. However, some of its members, such as actress and congresswoman Bete Mendes, voted for Neves, with three members (Airton Soares, Mendes and José Eudes) subsequently being expelled.

Candidate	Running mate	Party	Votes	%
Tancredo Neves	José Sarney	Brazilian Democratic Movement Party	480	72.73
Paulo Maluf	Flávio Marcílio	Democratic Social Party	180	27.27
Total			660	100.00
Total votes			660	–
Registered voters/turnout			686	96.21

== Aftermath ==
On 14 March 1985, just one day prior to his inauguration, president-elect Tancredo Neves fell ill with strong abdominal pain, and did not appear before Congress to take office as president on 15 March (the constitution required the oath of office to be taken before a joint session of the legislature). José Sarney, who had been elected vice-president, took office as vice-president on inauguration day, and immediately became acting president. This marked only the second time in Brazil's republican history that a sitting government peacefully transferred power to the opposition. On 21 April 1985, Neves died from a generalized infection. Although he was never technically president because he never took the constitutional oath, he died during his presidential term and Congress passed a special statute, directing that his name be included on the official list of Brazilian presidents as a matter of homage. Upon the death of the President-elect, acting president Sarney succeeded to the presidency.

The Democratic Alliance's promise of passing a constitutional amendment to the 1967-1969 constitution, summoning elections for a National Constituent Assembly was fulfilled on 27 November 1985, with the enactment of the 26th Amendment to the constitution inherited from the military regime era. Under that Amendment, the members of the 48th Legislature of Brazil's National Congress, which assembled on 1 February 1987 after the 1986 legislative elections, convened as a National Constituent Assembly, with unlimited powers to draft and enact a new constitution. The constitution was promulgated on 5 October 1988.
