= Bohn Gass =

Brazilian historian and politician

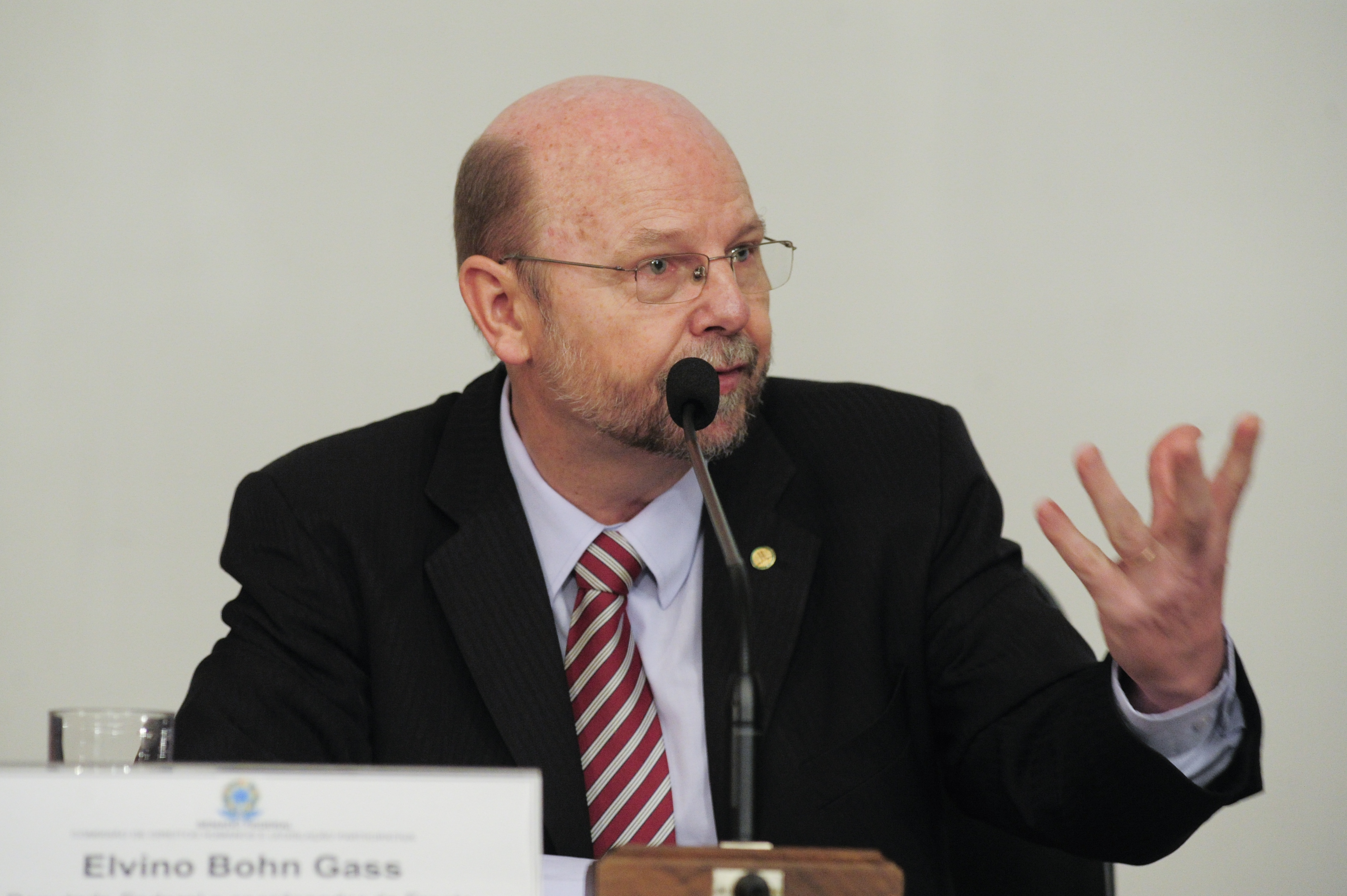
- Bohn Gass in 2023

Member of the Chamber of Deputies
- Incumbent
- Assumed office 1 January 2011
- Constituency: Rio Grande do Sul

Member of the Legislative Assembly of Rio Grande do Sul
- In office 1 February 1999 – 1 February 2011
- Constituency: At-large

Member of the Municipal Chamber of Santo Cristo
- In office 1 January 1997 – 1 February 2019
- Constituency: At-large

Personal details
- Born: Elvino José Bohn Gass; 5 February 1962 (age 64) Santo Cristo, Rio Grande do Sul, Brazil
- Party: PT (1984–present)
- Education: Northwest Regional University of the State of Rio Grande do Sul; Federal University of Rio Grande do Sul
- Profession: Family farmer, teacher
- Website: bohngass.com.br

Elvino José Bohn Gass (February 5, 1962) is a Brazilian family farmer, historian, teacher, and politician affiliated with the Workers' Party (PT). He is currently serving his fourth term as a federal deputy for Rio Grande do Sul.

== Biography ==
=== Early years and education ===
The son of Ervino Bohn Gass and Olga Bohn Gass, Bohn Gass was born in the municipality of Santo Cristo, in the interior of Rio Grande do Sul, in 1962. He majored in Social Studies and minored in History at the Northwest Regional University of the State of Rio Grande do Sul (UNIJUÍ).

He was president of the Santo Cristo Rural Workers' Union for two terms, the first between 1986 and 1989 and the second between 1992 and 1995. In 2008 she took a postgraduate course in Social Management at the Federal University of Rio Grande do Sul (UFRGS).

=== Politics ===
He joined the Workers' Party (PT) after starting his political activism in the student movement and in the Pastoral da Juventude, a Catholic social organization. In 1994 and ran for state representative in Rio Grande do Sul. Gass was unsuccessful after receiving 17,155 votes. After two years, he ran for the position of councilor in the city of Santo Cristo, and was elected after receiving 901 votes. He received the most votes in the election.

In 1998, he was elected to the state legislature of Rio Grande do Sul after winning 30,282 votes. In 2002, he was re-elected to the position of state deputy and Gass was the second most voted PT deputy in the election, behind Raul Pont. In this election, the PT doubled its number of seats in the Legislative Assembly of Rio Grande do Sul (ALRS), from 6 seats to 12. He won his third mandate, in 2006, after receiving 43,770 votes.

After three terms as a state representative, he ran for federal deputy for Rio Grande do Sul in 2010. With the PT's Tarso Genro elected governor of Rio Grande do Sul, Gass was elected federal deputy for the first time in 2010, after receiving more than 90,000 votes. In his first term in the Chamber of Deputies, he initially aligned with the ruralist caucus in an early vote on the Brazilian Forest Code but later diverged from them. He opposed a bill that did not allocate 100% of oil royalties to education drawn up by Congressman Carlos Zarattini, also from the PT.

In 2011, he voted against the proposal to raise the minimum wage to R$ 600, instead supporting the Dilma government's proposal of R$545. He also voted in favor of the expropriation of properties where forced labor was found, redistributing them for agrarian reform or social housing programs. Additionally, he voted against the mandatory budget allocation constitutional amendment.

In the 2014 election, the PT unsuccessfully tried to re-elect Tarso to the state government, while Bohn Gass was re-elected as a federal deputy. During his second term in the Chamber of Deputies, he voted against PL 4330, which allowed broader outsourcing in the labor market. He supported Provisional Measures 664 and 665, which were part of Dilma Rousseff’s fiscal adjustment plan, tightening rules for survivor pensions and Unemployment insurance. He opposed the impeachment of Dilma Rousseff and voted in favor of the removal of Eduardo Cunha (PMDB) from office.

He also opposed removing Petrobras obligation to participate in all pre-salt oil exploration blocks and voted against the spending cap constitutional amendment. He rejected the high school education reform and opposed the labor reform of 2017. However, in the second round of voting, he supported recognizing vaquejada (a traditional rodeo-style event) as a cultural practice.

Additionally, he voted against the criminal charges filed by the Prosecutor General’s Office against then-President Michel Temer, and voted against the federal intervention in public security in Rio de Janeiro in 2018.

In the 2018 state elections, the PT had Miguel Rossetto as its gubernatorial candidate (he didn't make it to the second round – for the first time since the 1990 election), while Bohn Gass was re-elected as a federal deputy for a third term. In his third term in the chamber, voted against Provisional Measure 867 (which, according to environmentalists, would change the Forest Code by giving amnesty to deforesters); in favor of criminalizing those responsible for dam collapses; against the Pension Reform PEC and in favor of excluding teachers from its rules; in favor of increasing the party funding; against the suspension of the mandate of Congressman Wilson Santiago, accused of corruption; in favor of the anti-crime package drawn up by Sergio Moro, against the autonomy of the Central Bank; in favor of maintaining the imprisonment of deputy Daniel Silveira; against the privatization of Eletrobras.

In 2021, he became the party's leader in the Chamber of Deputies, replacing Enio Verri. As party leader, he put together an impeachment petition that was dubbed the 'super petition' against Jair Bolsonaro, as it unified 123 petitions made during his government into a single petition. The document was presented to the president of the Chamber of Deputies, Arthur Lira, and contained 23 crimes of responsibility with 45 signatories, including politicians, social movements and civil society organizations.

While the PT launched the name of Edegar Pretto for governor of Rio Grande do Sul, in 2022, failing to advance to the second round, Gass was elected to his fourth term in Brasília. The largest caucus elected in the state in the election was the PT with six seats. During his time in office, he voted in favor of the tax reform and in favor of Pé-de-Meia. In the 2026 election, he was elected to a fifth term after receiving more than 110,000 votes, making him the second-highest vote-getter in the PT, behind only Maria do Rosário.

==== Electoral performance ====
Year	Election	Position	Party	Coalition	Substitutes	Votes	Result	Ref.
1994	Gubernatorial election in Rio Grande do Sul	State Deputy	PT	PT / PCdoB / PSB / PPS / PV / PSTU	—N/a	17,155	Substitute (64th most voted, 11th in the coalition)	
1996	Municipal election in Santo Cristo	Councilor	PT	no proportional coalition	Genoveva Hass (PT), Jorge Nonnemacher (PT)	901 (9.09%)	Elected (most voted candidate)	
1998	Gubernatorial election in Rio Grande do Sul	State Deputy	PT	PT / PCdoB / PCB / PSB	Jussara Cony (PCdoB), José Gomes (PT)	30,282 (0.69%)	Elected (33rd most voted, 8th in the coalition)	
2002	Gubernatorial election in Rio Grande do Sul	State Deputy	PT	PT / PCdoB / PCB / PMN	Miriam Marroni (PT), Roque Graziottin (PT)	60,578 (1.13%)	Re-elected (5th most voted, 2nd in the coalition)	
2006	Gubernatorial election in Rio Grande do Sul	State Deputy	PT	PT / PCdoB	Julio Quadros (PT), Luís Fernando Schmidt (PT)	43,770 (0.81%)	Re-elected (28th most voted, 6th in the coalition)	
2010	Gubernatorial election in Rio Grande do Sul	Federal Deputy	PT	no proportional coalition	Paulo Ferreira (PT), Fabiano Pereira (PT)	90,096 (1.58%)	Elected (23rd most voted, 7th in the party)	
2014	Gubernatorial election in Rio Grande do Sul	Federal Deputy	PT	no proportional coalition	Ronaldo Zülke (PT), Ivar Pavan (PT)	100,841 (1.83%)	Re-elected (26th most voted, 7th in the party)	
2018	Gubernatorial election in Rio Grande do Sul	Federal Deputy	PT	no proportional coalition	Marco Maia (PT), Claudir Nespolo (PT)	102,964 (1.87%)	Re-elected (12th most voted, 4th in the party)	
2022	Gubernatorial election in Rio Grande do Sul	Federal Deputy	PT	PT / PCdoB / PV	Reginete Bispo (PT), Anacleto Zanella (PT)	131,881 (2.14%)	Re-elected (8th most voted, 3rd in the party)	
2026	Gubernatorial election in Rio Grande do Sul	Federal Deputy	PT	PT / PCdoB / PV		111,196 (1.82%)	Re-elected (13th most voted, 2nd in the party)	

== Personal life ==
Gass is married to teacher Érica, with whom he has two children. He has a Catholic background.
