= Companhia Carris Porto-Alegrense =

Brazilian public transportation company

Companhia Carris Porto Alegrense
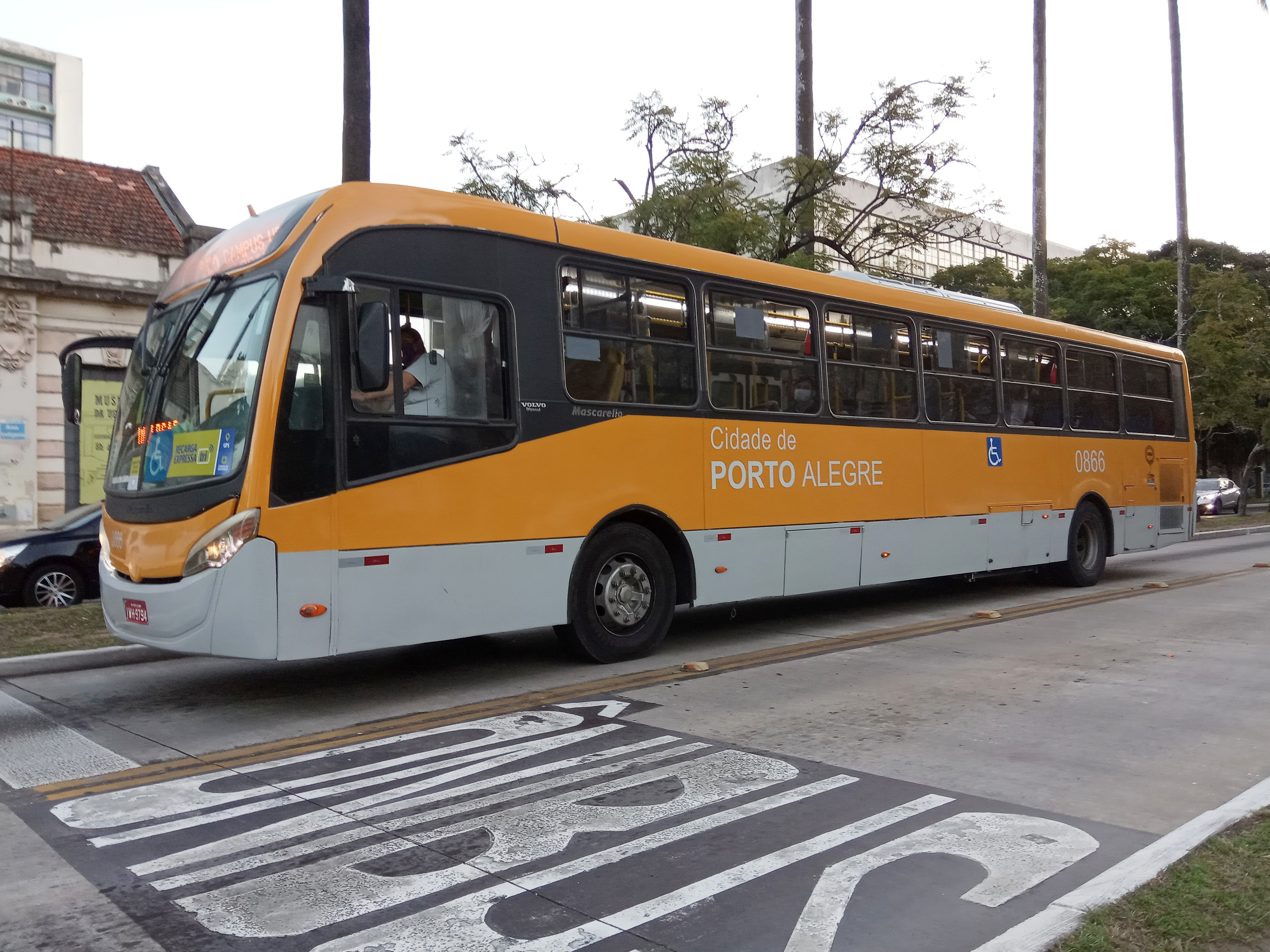
- Mascarello GranVia BRS Volvo B290R Bus
- Company type: Private
- Founded: June 19, 1872; 153 years ago
- Headquarters: Porto Alegre, Rio Grande do Sul, Brazil
- Products: Public Transportation
- Website: http://www.carris.com.br/

Companhia Carris Porto-Alegrense, also known as Carris, is one of the operating companies of Porto Alegre's public transportation, which also includes the consortiums Viva Sul, Mob, Via Leste, and Consórcio Mais. Its fleet is formed by 347 buses and serves a large part of the city, with about 30 lines.

Founded in 1872, in 1953 it became a mixed economy public company under the controlling interest of the City Hall of Porto Alegre, which held 99.9% of the shares. Carris was considered by the National Association of Public Transportation as the best urban bus company in Brazil in 1999 and 2001. In 2022 it was privatized, amidst many protests.

== History ==
Carris is the oldest public transportation company in the country in activity, and was created with the authorization of Emperor Dom Pedro II, through a decree published on June 19, 1872. At the time, Porto Alegre was a quiet little town of only 34,000 inhabitants that had just celebrated its 100th anniversary. It initially operated mule-drawn streetcars, but in 1908, the company inaugurated electric streetcars service, which would only be deactivated in 1970. The streetcars were dominant until the 1920s, when the first automobiles powered by gasoline, kerosene, or oil began to circulate. In 1926, it started to offer bus transportation. In 1928, it was bought by the American company Electric, Bond & Share, receiving its current name, and on November 29, 1953, the company was taken over by the city government.

In the late 1960s, the company had several trolleybuses (electric buses) that replaced the streetcars; the vehicles were equipped with FNM chassis, Massari body, and Villares electrical components. In 1970, the last electric streetcars still operated, on the Teresópolis, Partenon and Glória lines; it retired on March 8 with festivities. In this decade, Carris operated the first air-conditioned buses in the history of Porto Alegre. The vehicles operated a selective service that served the region of the Bela Vista neighborhood and were also equipped with a waitress, coffee and newspaper on board. Some trolleybuses that operated in the city of Araraquara for the CTA, belonged to Carris and were in use until the 2000s. In 1974, a school for drivers was set up.

In 1980, the single fare was implemented. In 2007, electronic ticketing was introduced and the vehicles started running on biodiesel. Recently, thematic lines were created; the Tourism Line in the Historic Center in 2004; Social Line for schoolchildren and social entities in 2009; Black Territories Line in 2010; Friendly Pet Line, for animals of needy families, and Operation Safe Ballad of the C4 Line in 2011. In this year, its Documentation and Memory Unit was inaugurated. Also in this decade, investments were made in fleet renewal, passenger safety and comfort, and employee qualification. In 2014, it was certified as a Citizen Company by the Regional Accounting Council of the State of Rio de Janeiro. The Carris company launched the city's circular and transversal lines. It was the first company in Porto Alegre to use vehicles that facilitated access to disabled people, initially with hydraulic elevators.

According to the financial statements released by the company, Carris recorded a deficit of R$74.2 million in 2016, a value that decreased to R$43 million the following year and R$19.2 million in 2018. In 2019, the company recorded a profit for the first time since 2012. In 2021, amid great controversy, Carris was privatized.

== Acknowledgment ==
Carris is the only municipal institution to win the Federal Government's National Public Management Award and, in 2005, it got the first place in the category Efficient Public Company in the Top of Mind Research, held in Porto Alegre.

In 2014, it received the title of Citizen Company, from the Regional Accounting Council of the State of Rio de Janeiro.

== Corruption ==
In 2013, an internal investigation denounced the embezzlement of almost one million reais from Carris through fraud in electronic ticketing. In 2018, the Public Ministry released a complaint that Ivsem Gonçalves, who had held a commissioned position in the company, had embezzled 1.7 million reais from the company through compensation unduly paid to a deceased man. The money served, among other purposes, to make electoral donations, on behalf of the deceased, to campaigns of MDB candidates, including that of Governor José Ivo Sartori in 2016 and that of the candidate for mayor of Porto Alegre in 2016, Sebastião Melo.

== Purchase of new buses ==
Carris' biggest acquisitions occurred in 1987, when more than 50 new monoblock vehicles with Marcopolo and Thamco bodies arrived, equipped with Mercedes-Benz mechanics. In 2006, 62 new Neobus buses Mega 2006 Mercedes-Benz OF-1722M arrived. Throughout 2008, 76 new buses arrived, among them: Mega 2006 Low Entry with Agrale chassis; Millennium II and Viale, both Volkswagen 17-260 EOT chassis; and Urbanuss Pluss Articulated Volvo. In 2010, 82 new vehicles were purchased, such as Neobus Mega 2006 Articulated Mercedes-Benz O500MA (7 vehicles) and Gran Viale Low Entry Volvo and Mercedes-Benz (75 vehicles with air conditioning). The largest acquisition in the last five decades occurred in 2020, with the arrival of 98 Mascarello Gran Via Midi buses, with Mercedes-Benz chassis.

In January 2019, 83 Carris vehicles turned 13 years old and could no longer operate, according to a municipal law changed the previous year, which increased the useful life of the collectives from ten to twelve years. The company launched an invitation to tender for the renewal of the fleet in March, followed by a decree signed in May by Marchezan Junior to increase the useful life of the buses from twelve to fourteen years.

Despite the promise that new buses would be circulating in October, the difficulty in obtaining financing has delayed the purchase. In November, the City Council authorized the company to contract almost 41 million reais of credit for the purchase of 87 buses, and the municipal administration promised that the buses would be on the streets in February of the following year. However, a new public notice was only launched in February of the following year, when the legislation required the exchange of 97 buses. The new buses only started running in August 2020, about a year and a half later than promised by the city administration.

== Privatization ==
During the campaign in 2016, Marchezan Junior denied that he had any intention of privatizing Carris. However, in June 2017, the mayor stated that Carris could be privatized. The following month, he again maintained that the company should be privatized or that it should bid out lines. In June 2018, the city government hired a consulting firm to analyze Carris and the mayor again argued that privatization was one of the options for the company.

Marchezan's successor, Sebastião Melo, continued the privatization project. Amidst many protests by employees and the community, the privatization of Carris was approved by the City Council on September 8, 2021, authorizing the city to sell its assets and grant the lines to private companies. The eight amendments, all from the opposition, were rejected. The city may also "concede, in whole or in part, its participation in the company, the control of shares on the stock exchange, its power to decide on its behalf and to choose who will run the company, transform, merge, divide, slice, incorporate, liquidate, dissolve, extinguish or deactivate the company. It even has the right to accept to be replaced when it comes time to enjoy some benefit or receive some credit from some financing". In short, the main argument was that the company was loss-making, outdated, and unable to adapt to new demands. The city government claimed that in 2022 it would have to invest half a billion reais to cover the accumulated debts.

Even before privatization became effective, the proposal had already received numerous criticisms. A strike was organized by employees in protest, a petition circulated, and 16 entities and unions came together in a Broad Front in Defense of Carris and Quality Transportation. However, it was a common opinion that public transportation was in great difficulty, with an old fleet, a sharp reduction in the number of users, and expensive fares. The City Hall insisted on privatization as the only possible solution, and guaranteed that the population would continue to be served without any loss, but the Broad Front offered several management alternatives to reverse the crisis and keep the company public. Critics still have many uncertainties about the quality and accessibility of services in this new stage. Carris operates 22 lines and serves 25.3% of Porto Alegre's 423,000 bus users, according to data from 2021. Before the COVID-19 pandemic, which reduced passengers worldwide, it served about 193,000 passengers. Some problems stem in part from broader contexts, such as the pandemic and the global economic crisis, but mismanagement has also been pointed out. Critics also argue that recent governments have adopted a practice of deliberately scrapping public services in order to justify their concession to the private sector by organizing a large program of privatizations.

The Union of Federal Judiciary and Public Ministry Workers in Rio Grande do Sul published a note claiming that the official justifications are lies and part of a process "that resonates with the destruction promoted at the federal level by the government of Jair Bolsonaro". Carris is "a city's patrimony and fundamental for the search for transport democratization". Fabricio Loguércio, director of the union, said that "the fight in defense of the public Carris is, in fact, a fight in defense of public transportation. Carris, founded in 1872, was once an example of public transportation. It has won awards as the best public transportation company in Brazil. It has always served to regulate the system in Porto Alegre. However, after a sequence of disastrous administrations, with several corruption scandals (according to the media), it was being scrapped. Despite all this, it is still the best one in Porto Alegre". According to André Augustin, from the Observatório das Metrópoles,

Unfortunately, in the last few years, the successive neoliberal administrations at Porto Alegre's City Hall have promoted its destruction. The quality fell, but even so it remained above the competition. In 2021, the average age of the Carris fleet was 5.2 years, against 7.7 years for the private companies (above the allowed by law). In addition, 94% of Carris buses had air conditioning, against 41% of the private ones. It was also Carris that saved the bus system during the pandemic, when private companies broke contracts and started abandoning the most loss-making lines. To guarantee the right to transportation, foreseen in the Constitution, Carris took over these lines - in an indirect subsidy to its competitors, who could operate only the profitable lines. This made Carris's losses increase, which was used as an argument by the mayor Sebastião Melo to end Carris.

The losses arose after Fortunati handed over the management of Carris to the PMDB, the party of his vice-president, Sebastião Melo. Among other scandals, more than one and a half million reais were embezzled by the company's financial coordinator, who then made several donations to his party's campaigns, including Melo's own. When he became mayor, Sebastião Melo used the damage started during his term as vice-mayor to argue that Carris could no longer be public. Then, he sent a bill to the City Council asking not for privatization, but a carte blanche to do whatever he wanted to destroy Carris. [...]

Just as happened a century ago, transportation and sanitation must serve not to meet the needs of the population, but to guarantee the profits of the providers of these services and also help the valuation of urban land. It is not, therefore, an absence of the state, but a strong state action to build a city that generates profit for certain sectors.

== Presidents ==
Carris presidents are appointed by the mayor of Porto Alegre.

| Year | President | Mayor | | | |
|---|---|---|---|---|---|
| 1993 - 1994 | Luiz Carlos Bertotto | Tarso Genro (PT) | | | |
| 1995 - 1998 | Túlio Luiz Zamin | Tarso Genro and Raul Pont (PT)|- | 1999 - 2002 | Maria Cristina Utzig Piovesan | Tarso Genro and João Verle (PT) |
| 2005 - 2010 | Antônio Lorenzi | José Fogaça (PPS and PMDB) | | | |
| 2010 - 2011 | João Pancinha | José Fortunati (PDT) | | | |
| 2011 - 2016 | Sérgio Zimmermann | José Fortunati (PDT) | | | |
| 2017 | Luís Fernando Ferreira | Nelson Marchezan Júnior (PSDB) | | | |
| 2017 - 2019 | Helen Machado | Nelson Marchezan Júnior (PSDB) | | | |
| 2019 - 2021 | César Griguc | Nelson Marchezan Júnior (PSDB) | | | |
| 2021 - 2024 | Maurício Gomes da Cunha | Sebastião Melo (MDB) | | | |
| 2024 - Present | Leonel David Bortoncello | Sebastião Melo (MDB) | | | |

== See also ==
- History of Porto Alegre
