= Raul Carrion =

Brazilian politician and trade unionist

Raul Kroeff Machado Carrion
- Raul in 2023 at a pro-Palestine rally

City Councillor of Porto Alegre
- In office 1 January 2001 – 31 January 2007

Member of the Legislative Assembly of Rio Grande do Sul
- In office 1 February 2007 – 31 January 2015
- Constituency: Rio Grande do Sul

Personal details
- Born: December 22, 1945 (age 80) Porto Alegre, Rio Grande do Sul, Brazil
- Party: Communist Party of Brazil
- Spouse: Elvira Ballester Lafertt (m. 1972; died 2025)
- Education: Federal University of Rio Grande do Sul (chemical engineering, withdrew 1967; chemistry, interrupted 1971); Pontifical Catholic University of Chile (chemistry, interrupted 1973); Federal University of Rio Grande do Sul (history, graduated 1998)
- Occupation: Historian labor union leader writer politician
- Known for: Political and union activism against the Brazilian military dictatorship; historical writings on the Communist Party of Brazil in Rio Grande do Sul
- Website: raulcarrion.com.br

Raul Kroeff Machado Carrion (December 22, 1945) is a Brazilian historian, labor union leader, writer, and politician. He served as a city council member in Porto Alegre and twice as a state deputy for Rio Grande do Sul, having been an active member of the Communist Party of Brazil (PCdoB) for more than 50 years.

== Biography ==
Raul Carrion was born in the city of Porto Alegre on December 22, 1945, the son of Erna Maria Kroeff Carrion, a teacher, and Francisco Machado Carrion, a lawyer who taught at the Federal University of Rio Grande do Sul (UFRGS). He attended elementary and high school at traditional schools in the capital city of Porto Alegre, such as Colégio Farroupilha and Colégio Anchieta. He became politically active at age 17, inspired by the movements for the Reformas de Base, a series of left-leaning reforms, of then-President João Goulart, and joined the Christian leftist movement known as Ação Popular.

After passing the college entrance exam, he enrolled at the UFRGS in 1964 to study chemical engineering. He soon began to get involved in activism within the university, through student councils and the National Union of Students (UNE). In 1967, he dropped out of the chemical engineering program to devote himself to political life and the labor movements in Porto Alegre, joining the transportation and metalworkers’ unions. In 1969, he secured a job as a machine operator at a shoe component factory in the city of Novo Hamburgo, in the interior of Rio Grande do Sul. There, he became involved in labor unions. Also that year, with the merger of Ação Popular-ML into the Communist Party of Brazil (PCdoB), Carrion became a party activist. In 1970, he re-enrolled at the UFRGS, this time to study chemistry.

In 1971, due to his political and union activism, Carrion was arrested by the Brazilian military dictatorship. As a result, he had to abandon his course and stop his studies. At the Department of Political and Social Order, he was subjected to torture methods such as the “pau de arara” and electric shocks after being accused of being a propagandist for the PCdoB and allegedly delivering ammunition to another party activist. After his release from torture, he went into exile in Chile, where he had a brother-in-law. There, he sought help from a professor at UFRGS, Ernani Maria Fiori of the Philosophy Department, who had been expelled and stripped of his teaching credentials due to his political views. Fiori was teaching at the Pontifical Catholic University of Chile (UC Chile) and secured a spot for Carrion in the chemistry program.

In 1973, following Augusto Pinochet’s coup in Chile, which ousted the then-president and Socialist Party leader Salvador Allende, Carrion was forced to flee to Argentina in search of political asylum. After getting married in Chile, he went into hiding in Argentina, where he organized the party. Following Jorge Rafael Videla’s 1976 coup in Argentina, Carrion returned to Brazil, traveling clandestinely to Goiânia. His wife was unable to return and remained in Argentina. It was not until 1979, with the passage of the Amnesty Law, that his wife was able to return safely to Brazil, and the couple returned together to Porto Alegre.

During the 1980s, Carrion began working in the metalworking industry, where he became involved in the labor movement. He worked at various factories in the electronics and metalworking sectors and also participated in the Diretas Já campaign. After the dictatorship came to an end, in the 1986 elections, Carrion was nominated as the PCdoB’s candidate for the Senate. However, his alternate, José Loguércio, had not yet turned 35, and the ticket was rejected.

In 1988, he ran for mayor of Porto Alegre on the PCdoB ticket, on a ticket with José Loguércio; however, they received only 2,671 votes, and he was the candidate with the fewest votes that year. In 1989, he traveled throughout Rio Grande do Sul, campaigning for Luiz Inácio Lula da Silva (PT) to become president against Fernando Collor de Mello (PRN).

In 1992, he ran for city councilor in Porto Alegre, but was named first alternate and served as a councilor on a few occasions. In 1996, he returned to his studies and took the UFRGS entrance exam for the history program. He graduated in 1998, and at his suggestion, his class invited economist and leader of the Landless Workers' Movement (MST), João Pedro Stédile, to serve as their guest of honor. His thesis was titled “The Communist Party of Brazil in Rio Grande do Sul—1922–1929.”

In 2004, he ran for city councilor in Porto Alegre and was elected with 8,405 votes. His coalition comprised the Workers’ Party (PT), the Communist Party of Brazil (PCdoB), the Brazilian Socialist Party (PSB), and the Brazilian Communist Party (PCB), which elected Tarso Genro as mayor of the city.

In 2004, he ran for reelection to the city council, receiving 11,651 votes, the fourth-highest total in that election. The PCdoB elected four more city council members in that election: Pedro Dias, Arthur Bloise, and Manuela d'Ávila. In that election, the PCdoB formed a coalition with the PT in support of candidate Raul Pont, who was defeated by José Fogaça of the Popular Socialist Party (PPS).

In the 2006 state election, following a decision by his party, he ran for state representative and was elected with 41,549 votes. In 2010, he ran for reelection as state representative and was re-elected with 34,791 votes In 2010 state election, he was one of the state deputies from Rio Grande do Sul who voted in favor of a 73% raise in their own salaries in December, a fact that inspired a critical song titled “Gangue da Matriz,” composed and performed by musician Tonho Crocco, whose lyrics name the 36 representatives (including Raul Carrion) who supported this self-granted pay raise; Giovani Cherini (PDT), who was president of the Legislative Assembly of Rio Grande do Sul (ALRS) at the time, filed a complaint against the musician. Cherini argued that it was a crime against his honor and that the song title was extremely aggressive and made reference to criminals who had killed the young man Alex Thomas. At the time, Adão Villaverde (PT), who later became Cherini’s successor as president of t ALRS, expressed his dissatisfaction, disagreeing with Cherini’s decision, but in August of that same year, Giovani Cherini himself filed a motion to dismiss the case against the musician, arguing that he was not a victim in the proceedings (his name did not appear in the lyrics, since, as president of the Rio Grande do Sul legislature at the time, he could not vote) and that he defended freedom of expression. At the time, Tonho received support from a company that put up 20 billboards throughout the capital, Porto Alegre, as well as immense support on social media.

Back in 2013, he took stock of his political career and decided not to run for reelection or seek new office. However, he stated that he would not abandon his political activism.

In 2019, he released his autobiography, Raul Carrion – A Luta Vale a Pena! published by Anita Garibaldi.

== Personal life ==
He married Elvira Ballester Lafertt, a teacher and political activist, in 1972; she died in June 2025. Elvira already had a seven-year-old daughter, who became Raul’s stepdaughter.

== Selected works ==
=== Books ===
- Luz e Sombras: Ensaios de Interpretação Marxista
- Os Fios de Ariadne: Ensaios de Interpretação Marxista
- Os Trabalhos e os Dias: Ensaios de Interpretação Marxista
- As Portas de Tebas: Ensaios de Interpretação Marxista
- Globalização, Neoliberalismo, Privatizações — Quem Decide Este Jogo?
- Século XXI — Barbárie ou Solidariedade?
- A Crise do Capitalismo Globalizado na Virada do Milênio

=== Reports and pamphlets ===
- Os Lanceiros Negros na Revolução Farroupilha
- Histórico da Luta pela Moradia do Parque dos Mayas: das Grandes Ocupações em 1987 até a Negociação Final em 2007
- Relatório da Delegação de Deputados da Assembleia Legislativa do Estado do Rio Grande do Sul ao Vietnã
- PCdoB 90 Anos: em Defesa da Democracia, da Soberania Nacional, dos Direitos dos Trabalhadores e do Socialismo
- Relatório: Missão Oficial da Assembleia Legislativa do Estado do Rio Grande do Sul à Palestina e Israel
- Relatório: Missão Oficial da Assembleia Legislativa do Estado do Rio Grande do Sul à República Popular da China
- Raul Carrion: 50 Anos de Militância Política e Revolucionária
- Cartilha da Lei Maria da Penha
- Revolução Farroupilha: a Mais Longa Revolta Republicana Enfrentada pelo Império Centralizador e Escravocrata
- Coluna Prestes: 90 Anos (1924–2014)
- 50 Anos do Golpe Militar no Brasil
- Relatório da Viagem à República Popular Democrática da Coreia
- Estatuto Estadual da Igualdade Racial
- Relatório: Visita de uma Delegação da Assembleia Legislativa do Rio Grande do Sul à República de Cuba
- Cartilha dos Direitos Fundamentais do Trabalhador
