= Timeline of Porto Alegre =

Historical timeline of the city Porto Alegre in Brazil

The following is a timeline of the history of the city of Porto Alegre, in the state of Rio Grande do Sul, Brazil.

== Prior to 20th century ==
- 1743 – Porto dos Cazaes founded by Azoreans.
- 1770 – Settlement becomes official residence of governor Jose Marcellino de Figuereido; renamed "Porto Alegre."
- 1773 – Câmara Municipal (town council) convenes.
- 1779 – Matriz de Porto Alegre (church) construction begins.
- 1789 – Palacio de Barro built.
- 1803 – Porto Alegre becomes a vila.
- 1807 – Capital of Portuguese colonial Sao Pedro do Rio Grande moves to Porto Alegre from Rio Grande.^{(pt)}
- 1822 – Porto Alegre attains city status.
- 1824 – Palacete do Visconde de Pelotas (residence) built.
- 1825 – German immigrants arrive.
- 1827 – Diário de Porto Alegre newspaper begins publication.
- 1835 - Captured by rebel forces.
- 1836 - Recaptured by Imperial forces; besieged between June and September.
- 1837 - Beginning of the second siege in May.
- 1838 - End of the second siege in February. Beginning of the third siege in June.
- 1840 - End of the third siege in December.
- 1854 – Ponte de Pedra (bridge) built.
- 1858 – Praça do Comércio and São Pedro Theatre founded.
- 1864 – Horse-drawn tram begins operating.^{(pt)}
- 1869 – Public Market built.
- 1871 – Biblioteca Pública do Estado (Rio Grande do Sul) (library) founded.
- 1872
  - Companhia Carris Porto-Alegrense (urban transport entity) formed.
  - Population: 43,998.
- 1878 – Sociedade Filarmônica Porto Alegrense (musical group) formed.
- 1881 – Exposição Brasileira-Allemã (international exposition) opens.
- 1890 – Felicíssimo Manuel de Azevedo becomes mayor.
- 1892 – O Exemplo newspaper begins publication.
- 1895 – Correio do Povo newspaper begins publication.
- 1898 – Velodrome built.
- 1900 – Population: 73,574.

== 20th century ==
- 1901
  - Town Hall of Porto Alegre (city hall) built.
  - Academia Rio-Grandense de Letras (learned society) founded.
  - Exposição Agropecuária e Industrial do Rio Grande do Sul de 1901 (exposition) held.
- 1903 – Grêmio Foot-Ball Porto Alegrense founded.
- 1906:
  - Porto Alegre general strike.
  - Arquivo Público do Estado do Rio Grande do Sul (regional archives) headquartered in city.
- 1908 – Electric tram begins operating.^{(pt)}
- 1909 – Sport Club Internacional (football club) founded.
- 1908 – Instituto de Belas Artes (art school) founded.
- 1910 – Roman Catholic Archdiocese of Porto Alegre established.
- 1913 – Population: 150,343.
- 1920 – Instituto Histórico e Geográfico do Rio Grande do Sul (learned society) founded.
- 1921 – Piratini Palace built.
- 1925:
  - Banda Municipal de Porto Alegre (musical group) formed.
  - Diário de Notícias newspaper begins publication.
- 1927 – Auditório Araújo Vianna (auditorium) opens.
- 1928:
  - Usina do Gasômetro (power plant) commissioned.
  - Bank of the Rio Grande do Sul established.
  - Cine Theatro Capitólio (cinema) opens.^{(pt)}
- 1934 – Universidade de Porto Alegre established.
- 1935:
  - Farroupilha Park opens.
  - 20 September: Farroupilha Revolution centennial fair opens.
- 1937 – Usina do Gasômetro 384-foot chimney erected.
- 1940 – Palácio do Comércio built.
- 1941 – Flood.
- 1950:
  - Penitenciária Feminina Madre Pelletier (prison) begins operating.
  - Orquestra Sinfônica de Porto Alegre (musical group) formed.
  - Population: 394,151.
- 1954:
  - Biblioteca Pública Infantil Central (children's library) founded.
  - Estádio Olímpico Monumental (stadium) opens.
- 1955:
  - Porto Alegre Book Fair begins.
  - Rio Grande do Sul Museum of Art opens.
- 1958:
  - Palácio Farroupilha built for the Legislative Assembly of Rio Grande do Sul.
  - Porto Alegre Botanical Garden opens.
- 1959:
  - Centro Histórico, Porto Alegre neighborhood created.
  - Central Prison begins operating.
- 1960:
  - Edifício Santa Cruz (hi-rise) built.
  - Population: 641,173.
- 1961 – Federal University of Health Sciences of Porto Alegre founded.
- 1963 – 1963 Summer Universiade sport contest held in city.
- 1964 – Zero Hora newspaper begins publication.
- 1969 – Estádio Beira-Rio (stadium) opens.
- 1970:
  - Hospital de Clínicas de Porto Alegre inaugurated.
  - Population: 903,175.
- 1972 – Rebuilding of Metropolitan Cathedral completed.
- 1974 – Monument to the Azoreans erected.
- 1976:
  - 27 April: Fire.
  - City joins the newly formed Federação das Associações de Municípios do Rio Grande do Sul (regional city association).
- 1978 – Biblioteca de Porto Alegre (library) established.
- 1979 – Museu de Porto Alegre (museum) founded.
- 1985:
  - Porto Alegre Metro begins operating.
  - November: Porto Alegre municipal election, 1985 held.
- 1987 - Centro Administrativo Fernando Ferrari (government center) completed.
- 1988 – Arquivo Histórico de Porto Alegre Moysés Vellinho (city archives) founded.
- 1989 – Participatory budgeting begins.
- 1991 – Population: 1,263,239.
- 1997 – Bienal do Mercosul (art exhibit) begins.
- 1999 – City website online (approximate date).
- 2000:
  - City joins the União das Cidades Capitais Luso-Afro-Américo-Asiáticas (city association).
  - Zona Rural de Porto Alegre abolished.

== 21st century ==
- 2001 – In January, the first World Social Forum of counter-hegemonic globalizers meets in Porto Alegre.
- 2002 – World Social Forum meets again in Porto Alegre.
- 2003 – World Social Forum meets yet again in Porto Alegre.
- 2005 – Festival de Cinema Fantástico de Porto Alegre begins.
- 2010 – José Fortunati becomes mayor.
- 2011 – 25 February: Cycling incident occurs in Cidade Baixa.
- 2012 – Arena do Grêmio (stadium) opens.
- 2013 – Parada Gráfica (cultural event) begins.
- 2014 – in June, part of 2014 FIFA World Cup (football contest) was held in Porto Alegre.
- 2016:
  - October: The 2016 Porto Alegre municipal election was held.
  - Population: 1,481,019.
- 2017 – Nelson Marchezan Júnior becomes mayor.

== Images ==
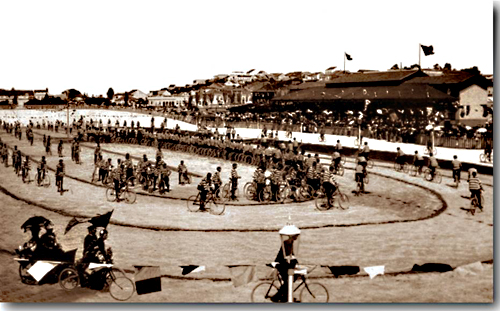
Velodrome, built 1898 (photo c. 1900)

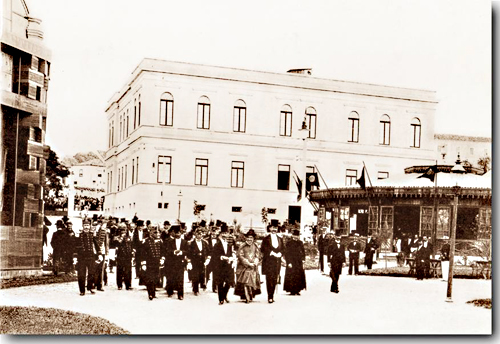
Opening of exposition, 1901

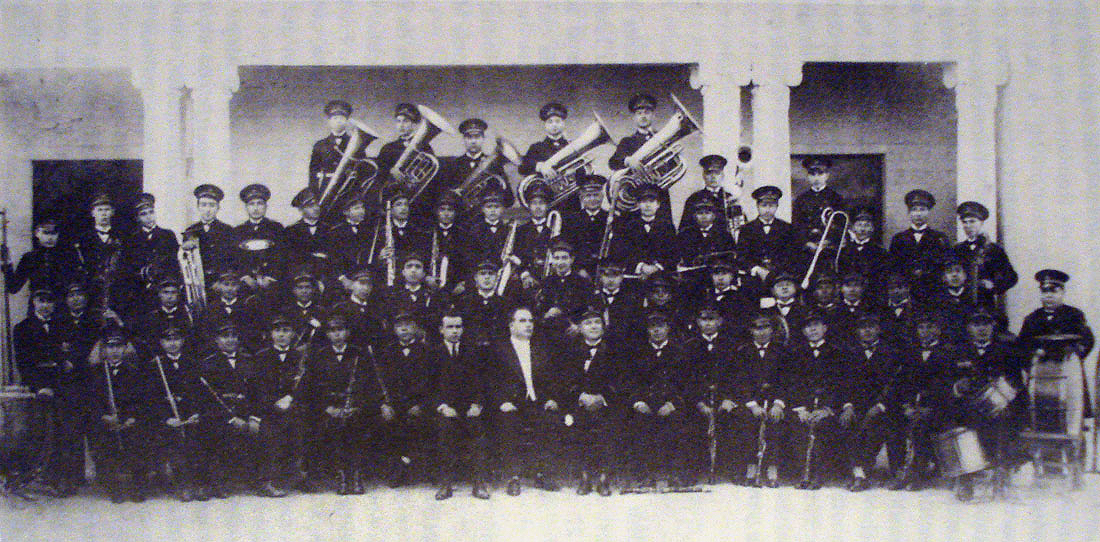
City Band, 1925

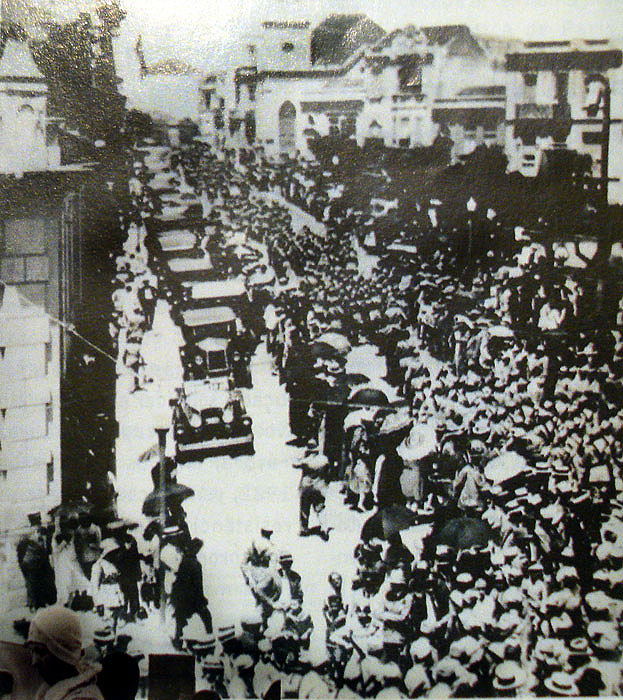
Revolution of 1930 in Porto Alegre

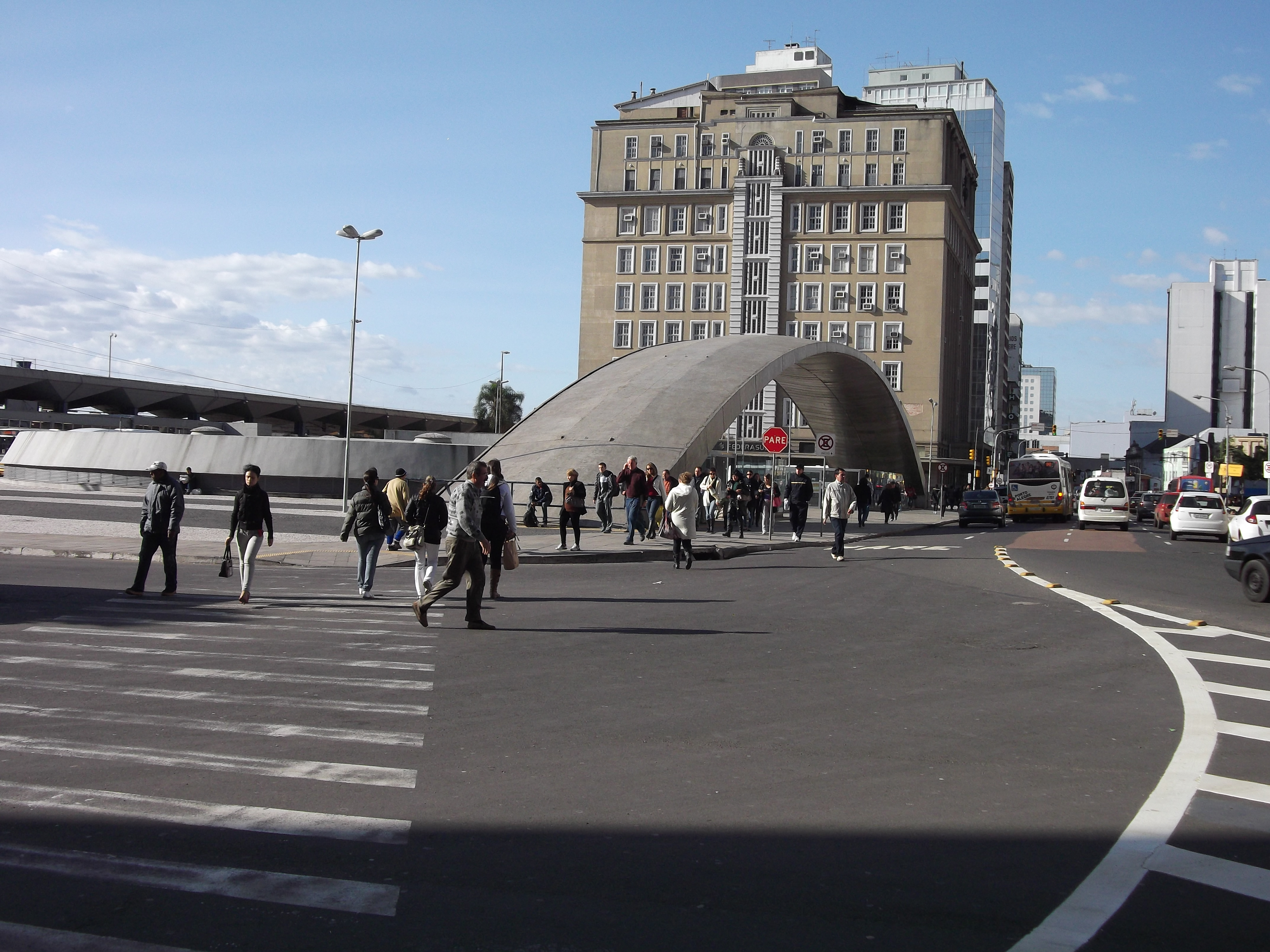
View of Palácio do Comércio, built 1940 (taken in 2011)

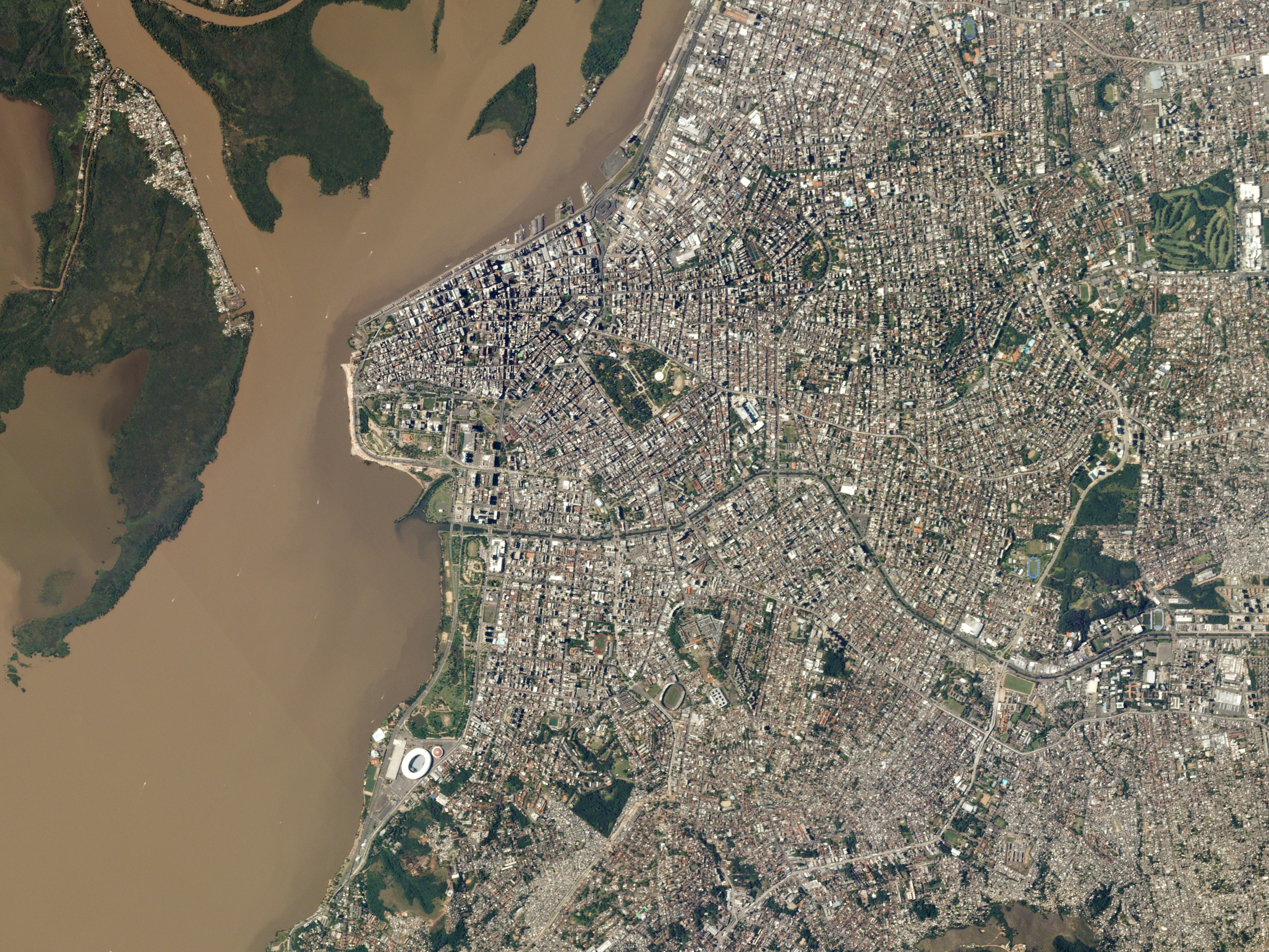
Aerial view of Porto Alegre, 2016

== See also ==
- History of Porto Alegre
- List of mayors of Porto Alegre
- History of transport in Porto Alegre
- History of classical music in Porto Alegre
- Arquivo Histórico do Rio Grande do Sul (regional archives)

== Bibliography ==
in English

- Michael George Mulhall; E.T. Mulhall (1877). "Port Alegre". Handbook of Brazil. Buenos Ayres. hdl:2027/mdp.39015014192523.
- "Porto Alegre" . Encyclopædia Britannica. Vol. 22 (11th ed.). 1910. p. 123.
- de Sousa Santos, Boaventura (December 1998). "Participatory Budgeting in Porto Alegre: Toward a Redistributive Democracy". Politics & Society. 26 (4): 461–510. doi:10.1177/0032329298026004003. hdl:10316/10839. S2CID 220787756.

in Portuguese

- Bento, Cláudio Moreira (1989). Porto Alegre - Memória dos Sítios Farrapos e a Administração de Caxias (PDF) (in Portuguese).
- Domingos de Araujo e Silva (1865). "Porto-Alegre". Diccionario historico e geographico da provincia de S. Pedro ou Rio Grande do Sul (in Portuguese). Rio de Janeiro: Laemmert. p. 77+.
- Manuel Pinheiro Chagas, ed. (1882). "Porto-Alegre". Diccionario Popular (in Portuguese). Vol. 10. Lisbon: Joaquim Germano de Sousa Neves. p. 36.
- Antônio Álvares Pereira Coruja (1888). Anno historico sul-rio-gran-dense em forma de ephemerides (in Portuguese). Rio de Janeiro: Jose Dias de Oliveira.
- Antonio de Azevedo Lima (1890). Synopse geographica, historica e estatistica do municipio de Porto Alegre [Synopsis of the geography, history and statistics of the municipality of Porto Alegre] (in Portuguese). Porto Alegre: Gundlach & C.a.
- Aquiles Porto-Alegre (1918). Homens Illustres do Rio Grande do Sul [Illustrious Men from Rio Grande do Sul] (in Portuguese) (2nd ed.). Livraria Selbach – via HathiTrust.
- Krawczyk, Flávio (24 April 2012). "Arte incidental - as mostras de artes plásticas em Porto Alegre entre 1875 e 1903" [Incidental art - plastic art exhibitions in Porto Alegre between 1875 and 1903]. Porto Arte (in Portuguese). 8 (14). doi:10.22456/2179-8001.27725.
- Luccas, Luis Henrique Haas (2000). "Arquitetura moderna em Porto Alegre: uma história recente" [Modern Architecture In Porto Alegre: a recent history]. Arqtexto (in Portuguese): 22–30. hdl:10183/22141.
- Sérgio da Costa Franco (2006). Porto Alegre: guia histórico (in Portuguese) (4th ed.). Editora da UFRGS.
- Mazo, Janice; Gaya, Adroaldo (May 2006). "As associações desportivas em Porto Alegre, Brasil: espaço de representação da identidade cultural teuto-brasileira" [Sports associations in Porto Alegre, Brazil: space for the representation of the German-Brazilian cultural identity]. Revista Portuguesa de Ciências do Desporto (in Portuguese). 6 (2): 205–213. doi:10.5628/rpcd.06.02.205.
- Winter, Leonardo Loureiro; Junior, Luiz Fernando Barbosa; Mânica, Sólon Santana (2008). "O Conservatório de Música do Instituto de Belas Artes do Rio Grande Do Sul: Fundação, Formação e Primeiros Anos (1908-1912)" [The Conservatory of Music of the Institute of Fine Arts of Rio Grande Do Sul: Foundation, Formation and Early Years (1908-1912)]. Revista do Conservatório de Música (in Portuguese) (1).
- Sérgio da Costa Franco (2013). Porto Alegre ano a ano: uma cronologia histórica: 1732-1950 (in Portuguese) (2nd ed.). Letra & Vida.
