= Government of Porto Alegre =

The government of Porto Alegre, bound to the Porto Alegre City Charter, is a mayor-council form of government, which is mandated by the Brazilian Constitution of 1988. The government of Porto Alegre is responsible for primary education, healthcare, libraries, parks and open spaces, sanitation, water supply, and youth correctional services.

The Mayor of Porto Alegre is elected for a four-year term, and vested all executive powers. Councillors are also elected for four-year terms. The Porto Alegre City Council is a unicameral body elected by open list system.

== Executive branch ==
The executive branch is represented in the office of Mayor of Porto Alegre, who is elected by direct vote for four-year terms. The mayor is only entitled to re-election once. The mayor appoints several secretaries. The deputy mayor, elected as the running mate of the mayor, performs the function of acting mayor whenever needed. The mayor may assign tasks to the deputy mayor.

The current mayor is José Fogaça, who was elected in 2004 with 431,820 votes (53.32% of all valid votes) in a run-off election. His election was a huge loss to the Worker's Party, of which all Porto Alegre's mayors between 1988 and 2004 were members. The current deputy mayor is Eliseu Santos, who is also the Health Secretary. Eliseu Santos promoted several polemical changes in the Porto Alegre health system. Despite being a doctor himself he confronted the doctors who work for the city health system in order to obtain more "productivity". Even though the doctors organized strikes, the intended changes aimed by the deputy mayor were carried out.

=== Cabinet membership ===
As of September 24, 2006, the membership for Porto Alegre cabinet is as follows:

- City Hall Press Office: Anilson Costa
- Secretary of Accessibility and Social Inclusion: Tarcízio Cardoso
- Secretary of Administration: Sônia Mauriza Vaz Pinto
- Secretary of Culture: Sergius Gonzaga
- Secretary of Education Marilú Fontoura de Medeiros
- Secretary of Environment: Beto Moesch
- Secretary of Health: Eliseu Santos
- Secretary of Human Rights and Urban Security: Kevin Krieger
- Secretary of Management: Clóvis Magalhães
- Secretary of Political Affairs and Local Government: Toni Proença
- Secretary of Production: Idenir Cecchim
- Secretary of Public Works: Maurício Dziedrick
- Secretary of Sports, Recreational Activities, and Leisure: Márcio Bins Ely
- Secretary of Treasury: Cristiano Roberto Tatsch
- Secretary of Urban Mobility: Luís Afonso Senna
- Secretary of Urban Planning: Isaac Ainhorn
- Secretary of Youth Affairs: Mauro Zacher
- Emergency Management Office: Sidnei Viapiana da Silva
- Office of the Attorney-General of Porto Alegre: Mercedes de Moraes Rodrigues
- Office of Budget: João Portella Pereira
- Office of Investment and Financial Resources Attraction: Cláudio Gandolfi
- Office of Tourism: Angela Baldino
- Public Sewage Department: Ernesto da Cruz Teixeira

== Legislative branch ==
All legislative powers are vested in the Porto Alegre City Council. The city council is a unicameral, open list, 36-member body. Council members are elected for four-year terms, with no term limit or re-election restriction.

There are six committees in the council; committee membership is defined by political party distribution in the council.

- Committee on Constitution and Justice
- Committee on Economy, Treasure, Budget, and Mercosur
- Committee on Urbanization, Transportation, and Housing
- Committee on Education, Culture, and Youth Affairs
- Committee on Consumer and Human Rights
- Committee on Health and Environment

== Official symbols of Porto Alegre ==
The official symbols of Porto Alegre are the anthem, city seal, and flag.

=== Porto Alegre anthem ===
The Porto Alegre anthem was composed by Breno Outeral, and declared the city's official anthem by the Municipal Ordinance 8451 on July 24, 1984. Below are the lyrics in Portuguese:

Porto Alegre Valerosa
Porto Alegre "Valerosa"
Com teu céu de puro azul
És a jóia mais preciosa
Do meu Rio Grande do Sul
Tuas mulheres são belas
Têm a doçura e a graça
Das águas, espelho delas,
Do Guaíba que te abraça
E quem viu teu sol poente
Não esquece tal visão
Quem viveu com tua gente
Deixa aqui teu coração.

=== Porto Alegre city seal ===
The Porto Alegre city seal was designed by Francisco Bellanca, who was commissioned by former mayor Ildo Meneghetti. Bellanca's design for city seal was approved by law on January 22, 1953. The seal contains several symbols of Portuguese colonization and traditions.

=== Porto Alegre's flag ===
Porto Alegre's flag was created on July 14, 1974 by Municipal Act 3893, which was signed into law by former mayor Telmo Thompson Flores. The flag is white, and has the Porto Alegre city seal at its center.
