= Raul Pont =

Brazilian historian and politician (born 1944)

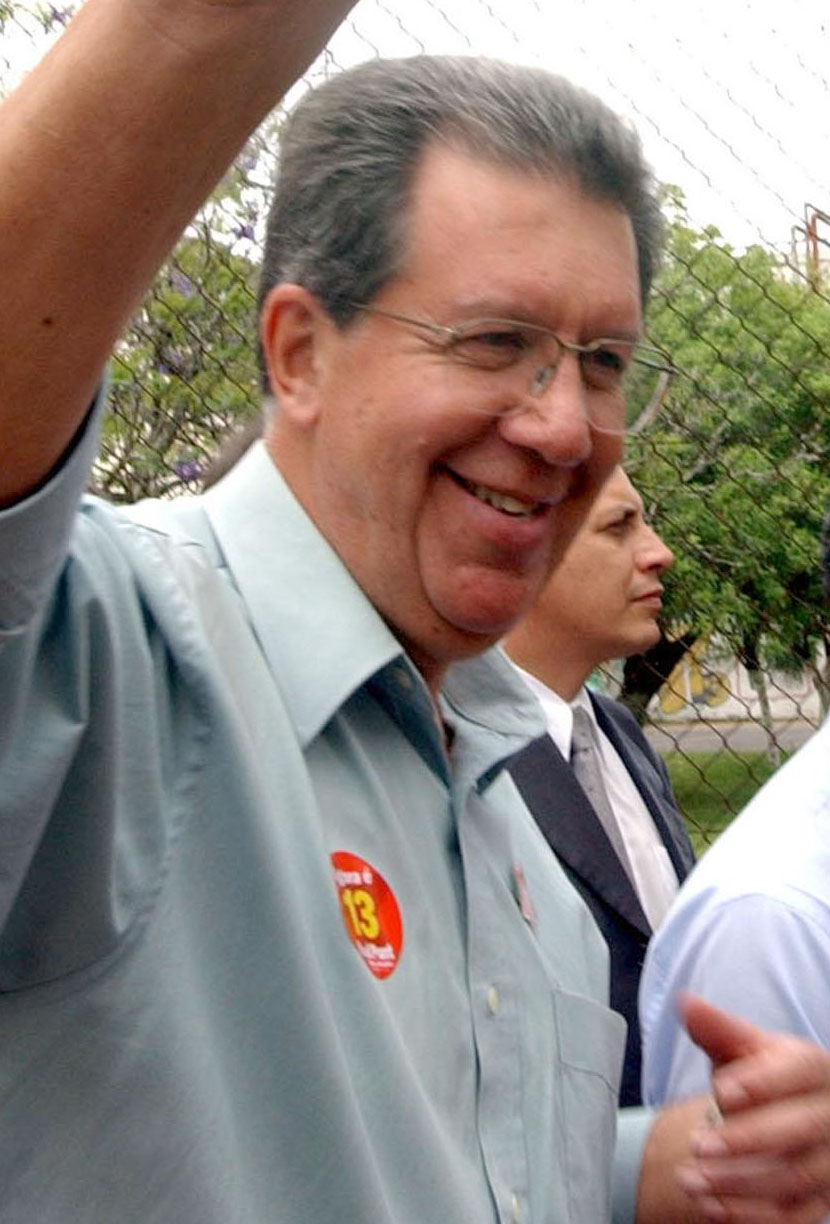

Mayor of Porto Alegre
- In office January 1, 1997 – January 1, 2001
- Deputy: José Fortunati
- Preceded by: Tarso Genro
- Succeeded by: Tarso Genro

Deputy Mayor of Porto Alegre
- In office January 1, 1993 – January 1, 1997
- Deputy: Tarso Genro
- Preceded by: Tarso Genro
- Succeeded by: José Fortunati

Federal Deputy for Rio Grande do Sul
- In office February 1, 1991 – April 1, 1992

State Deputy of Rio Grande do Sul
- In office February 1, 2003 – January 31, 2015

Personal details
- Born: 14 May 1944 Uruguaiana, Rio Grande do Sul
- Party: PT (1980–present)
- Occupation: Historian and university professor

Raul Jorge Anglada Pont (May 14, 1944) is a Brazilian historian and politician, founder of the Workers' Party (PT). He was a student leader, union activist, university professor, state and federal deputy, as well as the 39th mayor of Porto Alegre, between 1997 and 2001.

== Biography ==
=== Early years and education ===
He was born in Uruguaiana, in the interior of Rio Grande do Sul. He moved to the capital, Porto Alegre, to begin his studies at the Federal University of Rio Grande do Sul (UFRGS) in the 1960s.

As a history student at UFRGS, he became involved in politics as a student activist and was elected president of the Central Student Directory (DCE) in 1968. He was persecuted during the military dictatorship for his involvement with left-wing groups and moved to the city of São Paulo. He was kidnapped and imprisoned by the dictatorship in São Paulo after teaching a preparatory course for university entrance exams in the Liberdade neighborhood.

He was imprisoned for more than a year between the Department of Political and Social Order (DOPS) in São Paulo, the DOPS in Porto Alegre and Presídio Island, where the dictatorship sent political prisoners in Rio Grande do Sul during the dictatorship.

After his imprisonment, he took part in the Institute of Political, Economic and Social Studies (Iepes), an organization linked to the Brazilian Democratic Movement (MDB). He moved to São Leopoldo to become an assistant professor at Unisinos, where he stayed from 1977 to 1991 on the Social Sciences course. At the end of the 1970s, he took part in founding the newspaper Em Tempo.

=== Politics ===
In the early 1980s, he became involved in the union mobilizations that would culminate in the emergence of the Workers' Party (PT). He was one of the party's founders, serving as general secretary and president of the Rio Grande do Sul PT, a member of the national executive and treasurer.

While the PT was trying to establish itself as a political force in the state, he was a candidate for the Senate of Rio Grande do Sul in 1982. Three years later, in 1985, he was the party's candidate for mayor of Porto Alegre, the state capital. In the election, he came third, beaten by Alceu Collares (PDT) and Carrion Júnior (PMDB).

In 1986, he was elected a constituent state deputy - the PT's most voted candidate. He was leader of the caucus in the Legislative Assembly of Rio Grande do Sul (ALRGS) for the first two years of his mandate. After his state mandate, he ran for federal deputy for Rio Grande do Sul in Brasília. In the election, he was one of the four party members elected.

In 1988, the polls took the PT to the Porto Alegre mayoralty, with Olívio Dutra, for the first time. In 1992, then deputy Tarso Genro was elected mayor on a ticket with Raul Pont as his deputy. There was a tradition in the PT's municipal office in Porto Alegre that the deputy mayor elected on the ticket would run for mayor of the capital in the following election. It was no different in 1996, when Pont, then Tarso's deputy, ran for mayor, with José Fortunati completing the ticket.

Before that, in 1994, he ran for the Senate for the second time, without success. Elected in the first round in 1996 with 55% of the valid votes, Raul Pont continued the PT's hallmarks in the administration of Porto Alegre, such as participatory budgeting. During his administration, the PT began its most grandiose project in the capital, the construction of the 3rd perimetral, an expressway that connects the south to the north without passing through the city center. Started in 1998, the Perimetral spent the entire first half of the 2000s under construction, being completed at the end of 2006.

With the approval of re-election in 1997, the PT decided to hold internal preliminary elections for the 2000 municipal elections, breaking with the tradition of automatically nominating the deputy mayor. Raul Pont, José Fortunati and Tarso Genro competed. Tarso was chosen and was elected to the PT's fourth consecutive term in Porto Alegre. Tarso Genro won the election and kept the PT in power in Porto Alegre.

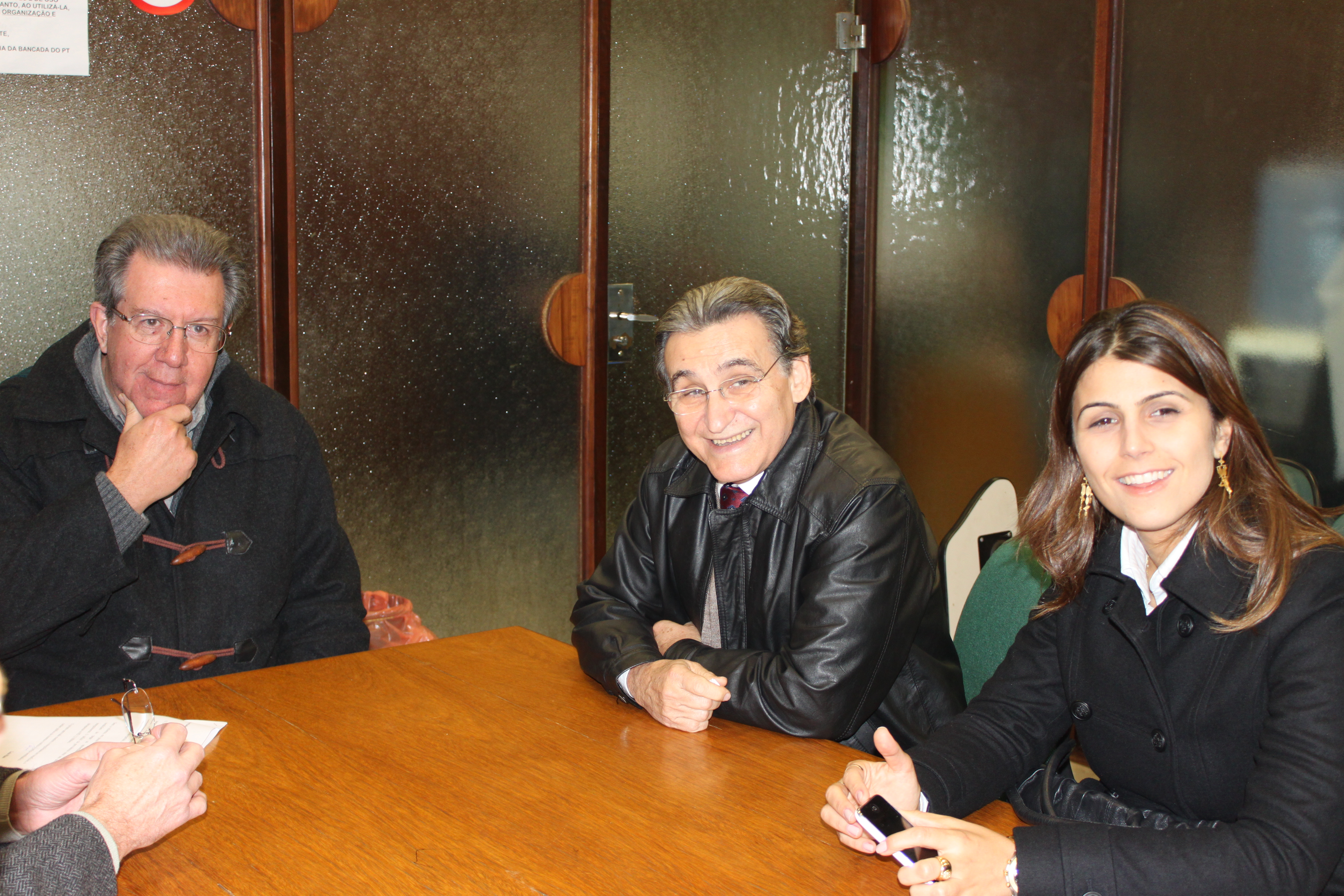
From left to right: Raul Pont, Renato Rabelo and Manuela d'Ávila at a meeting of the Worker's Party (PT) and Communist Party of Brazil (PCdoB).

In the 2002 elections, Raul Pont was elected state deputy and returned to the ALRGS, he was the second most voted in the election. In the same year, Tarso Genro resigned as mayor to run for governor, but was defeated, weakening the PT influence in the state capital.

In 2004, the previously unchallenged PT dominance in Porto Alegre was under threat. Tarso's resignation, the lack of charisma of his deputy João Verle, and the unpopular PT federal government led the Porto Alegre party leadership to nominate Raul Pont for the mayoral election, as he had been the most popular mayor in the city in recent decades. Pont won the first round with 37.62% of the valid votes but was defeated in the runoff by José Fogaça of the Socialist People's Party (PPS). With broad support from opposition parties, Fogaça secured 53.32% of the valid votes, ahead of Pont, who received 46.68%.

In 2005, Pont ran for the national presidency of the PT. As a member of the Democracia Socialista, a faction with limited influence in the Palácio do Planalto, Pont was among the PT members advocating for the party's renewal. He was the most voted opposition candidate in the internal elections and advanced to the runoff against the establishment candidate Ricardo Berzoini of the Campo Majoritário, but was ultimately defeated.

In the 2006 elections, Pont was elected state deputy with 73,286 votes (1.22% of the total valid votes), achieving the third-highest vote count for the position, the highest among PT candidates, and the highest among re-elected candidates. He was re-elected in 2010 elections as state deputy with 65,430 votes. Pont did not seek re-election in 2014.

In 2016, he ran again for mayor of Porto Alegre. He finished in third place and did not advance to the second round. In the second round, he chose not to support either Sebastião Melo (PMDB) or Nelson Marchezan Júnior (PSDB). In the 2022 presidential election, he opposed the alliance between Luiz Inácio Lula da Silva and Geraldo Alckmin. Despite the alliance's disagreement with Alckmin, he supported Lula's ticket in the election.

In 2023, he received the title of 'Deputy Emeritus' from the ALRGS.

== Electoral performance ==
Electoral Performance of Raul Pont
| Year | Election | Position | Party | Coalition | Substitutes | Votes | Result | Ref. |
|---|---|---|---|---|---|---|---|---|
| 1982 | Gubernatorial election in Rio Grande do Sul | Senator | PT | PT | Avani Keller, José Losada | 47,234 | Not elected | |
| 1985 | Municipal election in Porto Alegre | Mayor | PT | PT | Vice: Clóvis Ilgenfritz | 68,429 | Not elected (3rd place) | |
| 1986 | Gubernatorial election in Rio Grande do Sul | State Deputy | PT | PT | —N/a | 37,171 | Elected (most voted in PT) | |
| 1990 | Gubernatorial election in Rio Grande do Sul | Federal Deputy | PT | PT | —N/a | 68,947 (1.29%) | Elected (4th in PT) | |
| 1994 | Gubernatorial election in Rio Grande do Sul | Senator | PT | PT / PSB / PCdoB | —N/a | 664,167 (14.74%) | Not elected (3rd place) | |
| 1996 | Municipal election in Porto Alegre | Mayor | PT | PT / PCdoB / PSB | —N/a | 305,836 (55.04%) | Elected (1st round) | |
| 2002 | Gubernatorial election in Rio Grande do Sul | State Deputy | PT | PT / PCdoB / PMN | Miriam Marroni (PT), Roque Graziottin (PT) | 77,086 (1.44%) | Elected (2nd most voted) | |
| 2004 | Municipal election in Porto Alegre | Mayor | PT | PT / PCdoB / PSB | —N/a | 262,430 (37.62% 1st round; 46.68% 2nd round) | Not elected (1st in 1st round, lost runoff) | |
| 2005 | PT National Presidency | President | PT | Democracia Socialista | —N/a | 105,257 (48.4%) | Not elected (2nd place, lost runoff) | |
| 2006 | Gubernatorial election in Rio Grande do Sul | State Deputy | PT | PT / PCdoB | Julio Quadros (PT), Luís Fernando Schmidt (PT) | 73,286 (1.22%) | Re-elected (3rd most voted, 1st in PT) | |
| 2010 | Gubernatorial election in Rio Grande do Sul | State Deputy | PT | PT / PCdoB | Adão Villaverde (PT), Stela Farias (PT) | 65,430 (1.08%) | Re-elected (26th most voted, 5th in PT) | |
| 2016 | Municipal election in Porto Alegre | Mayor | PT | PT / PCdoB | —N/a | 83,806 (12.09%) | Not elected (3rd place) | |
