= Nik Neves =

Brazilian artist

- Born: 1976 (age 48–49); São Paulo, Brazil
- Education: Escola de Comunicação, Artes e Design; Federal University of Rio Grande do Sul; Autonomous University of Barcelona; School of Visual Arts
- Known for: Illustration, graphic art
- Website: Official website

Nik Neves (born 1976) is a Brazilian illustrator and graphic artist based in Porto Alegre (Brazil) and Berlin (Germany).

== Early life and education ==
Neves was born in São Paulo (Brazil), but grew up in Porto Alegre. He graduated in Advertising from Escola de Comunicação, Artes e Design (FAMECOS) in 2001, and received a second bachelor's degree in Visual Arts at the Instituto de Artes, Federal University of Rio Grande do Sul (UFRGS) in 2003. In 2004 he studied Illustration at the Autonomous University of Barcelona's Centre for Art and Design (EINA). After that, he continued his education studying lettering, typography and comics at School of Visual Arts (SVA) in New York.

== Work ==
Neves began working systematically as illustrator after he completed Curso Abril de Jornalismo in 2001. The first years of his career were more focused on editorial illustration, but soon after he started working also for publishing and advertising. Neves’ drawings have been published in Lonely Planet, National Geographic, Rolling Stones, Vogue, Le Monde, Descobrir Catalunya, Playboy, Runners. He has had major independent and corporate clients such as Brooklyn Industries, United Nations Food and Agriculture Organization, Hearst Corp, Condé Nast, Academy of Motion Picture Arts and Sciences (the Oscars), the Academy Awards (the Oscars), and H&M.

Highlighted and featured works are the minimalist book cover of the Brazilian edition of Infinite Jest by David Foster Wallace, and the book Declaração de amor (Declaration of Love), with poems by Carlos Drummond de Andrade, both for Cia das Letras.

In 2011, he illustrated the children book O imperdível menino que perdia tudo" by the author Marcelo Pires.

In 2013 his work was selected in the American Illustration annual 32 and by the Society of Illustrators 56th annual, being exhibited at the Society's building in New York in 2014.

== Comics ==
Since 2006 Neves works in his project and magazine Inútil (meaning “useless”, in Portuguese), where he develops and bring together his comics and more personal works. His work was also published in independent magazines such as C’est Bon Culture (Sweden), Strapazin (Switzerland), +Soma (Brazil), and Larva (Colombia). In 2013, along with Rafael Sica and Museu do Trabalho, he conceived and organized the first editions of the Independent Publication fair Parada Gráfica, which happens once a year in Porto Alegre, Brazil.
