= Márcio Thomaz Bastos =

Minister of Justice of Brazil (1935–2014)

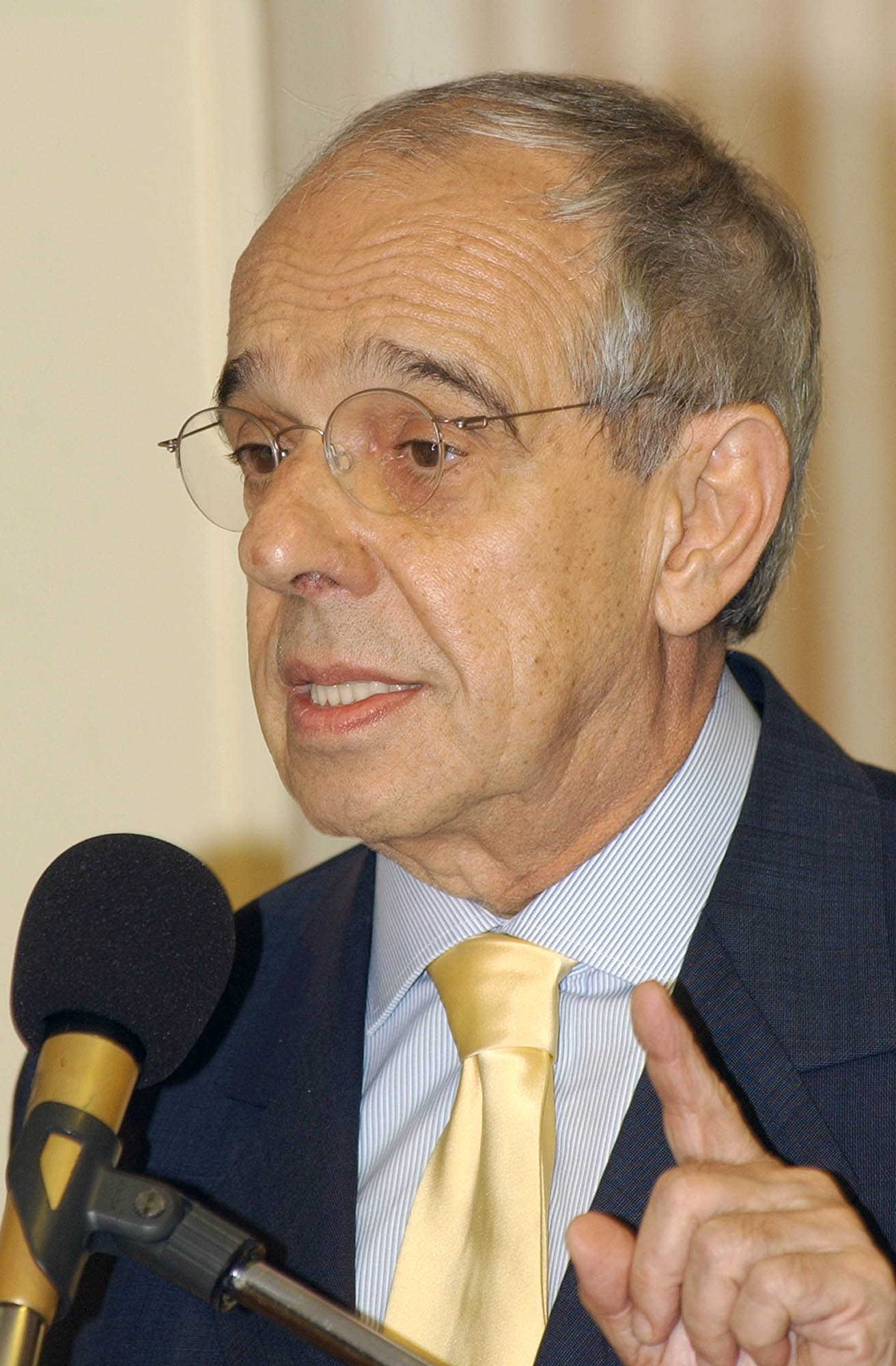
Márcio Thomaz Bastos

Márcio Thomaz Bastos (30 July 1935, in Cruzeiro, São Paulo – 20 November 2014, in São Paulo) was a Brazilian jurist who served as the Minister of Justice of Brazil from 2003 to 2007.

Political offices
Preceded by Paulo de Tarso Ramos Ribeiro	Minister of Justice; 2003–2007	Succeeded by Tarso Genro
