= Elton Welter =

Brazilian politician (born 1968)

Member of the Chamber of Deputies
- Incumbent
- Assumed office 14 March 2023
- Preceded by: Enio Verri
- Constituency: Paraná

Personal details
- Born: 23 November 1968 (age 57)
- Party: Workers' Party (since 1996)

Elton Carlos Welter (born 23 November 1968) is a Brazilian politician serving as a member of the Chamber of Deputies since 2023. He was a member of the Legislative Assembly of Paraná from 2003 to 2011 and from 2013 to 2015.
