= Mayor of Porto Alegre =

Head of the Porto Alegre, Brazil municipal government

The Mayor of Porto Alegre, Brazil, is the Chief Executive of the city. Mayors serve a four-year term, limited to one re-election. Mayoral activities are regulated by Sections IV, V, VI, Chapter VI of Porto Alegre City Charter. The current mayor is Sebastião Melo, since January 1st 2021; he is the 45th mayor of Porto Alegre.

Porto Alegre City Charter provides a succession line for any case of office vacancy. The first in line is the Deputy Mayor of Porto Alegre (who is elected in the same ticket of the Mayor), next is the Speaker of Porto Alegre City Council and, lastly, the Porto Alegre Attorney-General.

== Duties of the Mayor of Porto Alegre ==
Section V, Chapter VI enumerates duties of the Mayor of Porto Alegre. In general, the mayor has broad powers over Porto Alegre's bureaucracy, as Porto Alegre is set up to be in a strong mayor-council type of government. These are the duties of the Mayor of Porto Alegre, as set forth by Article 94, Section V, Chapter VI of Porto Alegre City Charter:

1. Appoint and dismiss Secretaries, Directors of the several Departments, and everyone in charge of Porto Alegre's public bodies
2. Sign into law bills passed by Porto Alegre City Council, enacting ordinances for execution of several Acts of City Council
3. Veto bills passed by City Council
4. Disposal of municipal administration
5. Dispose on civil servants, except for those under jurisdiction of City Council
6. Report annually to City Council on public works
7. Sponsor bills whose purposes are
  - Hiring of new servants, pay rises
  - Legal situation of civil servants
  - Creation and management of bodies under Mayor's jurisdiction
8. Reply, no later than 45 days after filing, to questions raised by City Council and several other bodies
9. Stand for Porto Alegre
10. Take loans with prior City Council approval
11. Issue condemnation orders
12. Propose selling or leasing of government-owned assets with City Council approval
13. Propose deals, agreements beneficial for Porto Alegre
14. Propose administrative division of Porto Alegre
15. Bring lawsuits disputing constitutionality of Acts
16. Buy stocks, raise capital for public-owned enterprises
17. Declare state of emergency
18. Nominate NGOs for supervision alongside government entities
19. Reply, no later than 45 days after filing, about the feasibility of bills

== List of mayors of Porto Alegre ==
| Mayor | Term | Party |
|---|---|---|
| Alfredo Augusto de Azevedo | October 12, 1892 - January 3, 1896 | PRR |
| João Luiz de Farias Santos | January 3, 1896 - October 10, 1896 | PRR |
| Febeliano da Costa | October 15, 1896 - March 15, 1897 | PRR |
| José Montaury | March 15, 1897 - October 15, 1924 | PRR |
| Otávio Rocha | October 15, 1924 - February 27, 1928 | PRR |
| Alberto Bins | February 27, 1928 - October 22, 1937 | PRR |
| José Loureiro da Silva | October 22, 1937 - September 15, 1943 | Independent |
| Antônio Brochado da Rocha | September 15, 1943 - May 14, 1945 | Independent |
| Clóvis Pestana | May 14, 1945 - November 6, 1945 | PSD |
| Ivo Wolf | November 6, 1945 - February 21, 1946 | PDC |
| Egídio Soares da Costa | February 21, 1946 - November 11, 1946 | PSD |
| Conrado Rigel Ferrari | November 11, 1946 - March 27, 1947 | PSD |
| Gabriel Pedro Moacyr | March 27, 1947 - July 15, 1948 | PSD |
| Ildo Meneghetti | July 15, 1948 - February 1, 1951 | PSD |
| Elyseu Paglioli | February 1, 1951 - November 17, 1951 | PTB |
| José Antonio Aranha | November 17, 1951 - January 1, 1952 | PTB |
| Ildo Meneghetti | January 1, 1952 - July 3, 1954 | PSD |
| Ludolfo Boehl | July 3, 1954 - September 13, 1954 | UDN |
| Manoel Osório da Rosa | September 13, 1955 - January 31, 1955 | PL |
| Manoel Sarmanho Vargas | January 31, 1955 - October 3, 1955 | PTB |
| Martim Aranha | January 3, 1955 - January 1, 1956 | UDN |
| Leonel Brizola | January 1, 1956 - December 29, 1958 | PTB |
| Tristão Sucupira Vianna | December 29, 1958 - January 1, 1960 | PTB |
| Loureiro da Silva | January 1, 1960 - January 1, 1964 | PDC |
| Sereno Chaise | January 1, 1964 - May 8, 1964 | PTB |
| Célio Marques Fernandes | May 9, 2004 - April 13, 2004 | ARENA |
| Renato Souza | April 13, 1965 - June 9, 1965 | MDB |
| Célio Marques Fernandes | June 9, 1955 - May 31, 1969 | ARENA |
| Telmo Thompson Flores | May 31, 1969 - April 8, 1975 | ARENA |
| Guilherme Socias Villela | April 8, 1975 - April 8, 1983 | ARENA |
| João Antonio Dib | April 8, 1983 - January 1, 1986 | ARENA |
| Alceu Collares | January 1, 1986 - January 1, 1989 | PDT |
| Olívio Dutra | January 1, 1989 - January 1, 1993 | PT |
| Tarso Genro | January 1, 1993 - January 1, 1996 | PT |
| Raul Pont | January 1, 1997 - January 1, 2001 | PT |
| Tarso Genro | January 1, 2001 - April 4, 2002 | PT |
| João Verle | April 4, 2002 - January 1, 2005 | PT |
| José Fogaça | January 1, 2005 - March 30, 2010 | MDB |
| José Fortunati | March 30, 2010 - January 1, 2017 | PDT |
| Nelson Marchezan Júnior | January 1, 2017 - January 1, 2021 | PSDB |
| Sebastião Melo | January 1, 2021 - Present | MDB |

== See also ==
- Government of Porto Alegre
- List of Porto Alegre municipal elections
- Timeline of Porto Alegre
- List of mayors of largest cities in Brazil (in Portuguese)
- List of mayors of capitals of Brazil (in Portuguese)

== Notes ==
- "Galeria dos Ex-Prefeitos." Prefeitura de Porto Alegre. 16 Sept. 2006 <https://web.archive.org/web/20081029145202/http://www2.portoalegre.rs.gov.br/infocidade/default.php?p_secao=23>.
- Lei Orgânica - Atualizada Até a Emenda Nº 24 (Emenda Nº 23 Em Anexo)." Câmara Municipal de Porto Alegre. 16 Sept. 2006 <http://www.camarapoa.rs.gov.br/biblioteca/integrais/LOMatualizadaatéEmenda24_Emenda23emAnexo.htm>.
