= Santo Cristo =

Municipality in Rio Grande do Sul, Brazil

Coordinates: 27°49′26″S 54°39′46″W

- Municipality
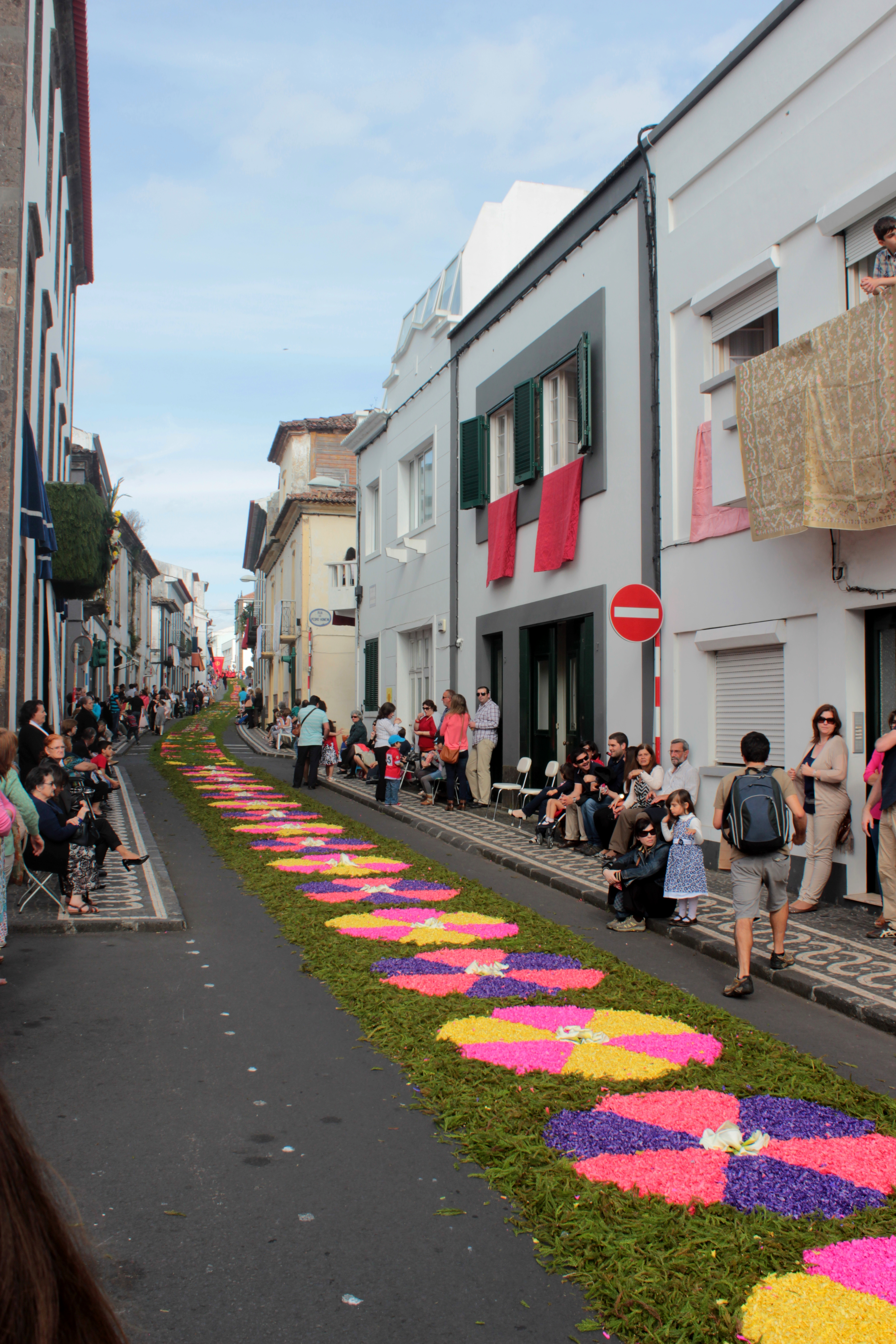

- Flag Coat of arms

- Location of Santo Cristo in Rio Grande do Sul
- Country: Brazil
- Region: South
- State: Rio Grande do Sul
- Mesoregion: Noroeste Rio-Grandense
- Microregion: Santa Rosa
- Founded: 28 January 1955

Government
  - Mayor: Adair Philippsen (MDB, 2021 - 2024)

Area
  - Total: 367.202 km^{2} (141.777 sq mi)

Population (2021)
  - Total: 14,177
  - Density: 38.608/km^{2} (99.995/sq mi)
- Demonym: Santocristense
- Time zone: UTC−3 (BRT)
- Website: Official website

Santo Cristo is a municipality in the state of Rio Grande do Sul, Brazil. As of 2020, the estimated population was 14,216.

The municipality would be partially flooded by the proposed Panambí Dam.

== See also ==
- List of municipalities in Rio Grande do Sul
