= João Verle =

Brazilian politician and economist

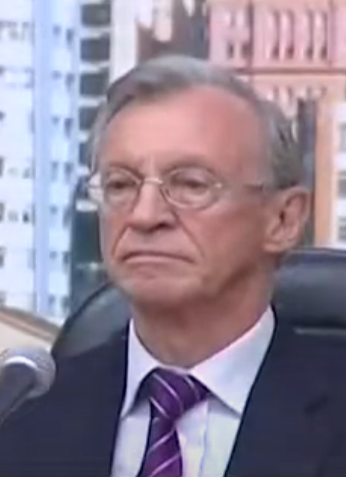

Mayor of Porto Alegre
- In office April 4, 2002 – January 1, 2005
- Preceded by: Tarso Genro
- Succeeded by: José Fogaça

Personal details
- Born: November 29, 1939 Caçador, Santa Catarina, Brazil
- Died: November 7, 2015 (aged 75) Porto Alegre, Rio Grande do Sul
- Party: PT

João Acir Verle (November 29, 1939 – November 7, 2015) was a Brazilian economist and politician. He served as the 41st Mayor of Porto Alegre from 2002 to 2005.
