= José Fortunati =

Brazilian lawyer and politician (born 1955)

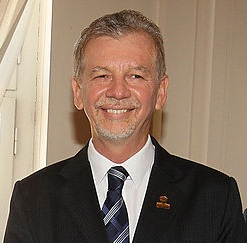
- Fortunati in 2012

64th Mayor of Porto Alegre
- In office March 30, 2010 – January 1, 2017
- Preceded by: José Fogaça
- Succeeded by: Nelson Marchezan Júnior

Personal details
- Born: October 24, 1955 (age 70) Flores da Cunha, Rio Grande do Sul, Brazil
- Party: PT (1980–2002); Democratic Labour Party (PDT)

José Alberto Reus Fortunati (born October 24, 1955 Flores da Cunha, Rio Grande do Sul) is a Brazilian lawyer, politician, and member of the Democratic Labour Party (PDT). Fortunati served as the Mayor of Porto Alegre from March 30, 2010, to January 1, 2017. He won re-election in 2012 with 65.2% of the vote in the city's mayoral election.

Fortunati was previously a member of the national Chamber of Deputies from 1990 to 1996.

== See also ==
- List of mayors of Porto Alegre
- Timeline of Porto Alegre
