= Monument to the Azoreans =

- Monumento aos Açorianos
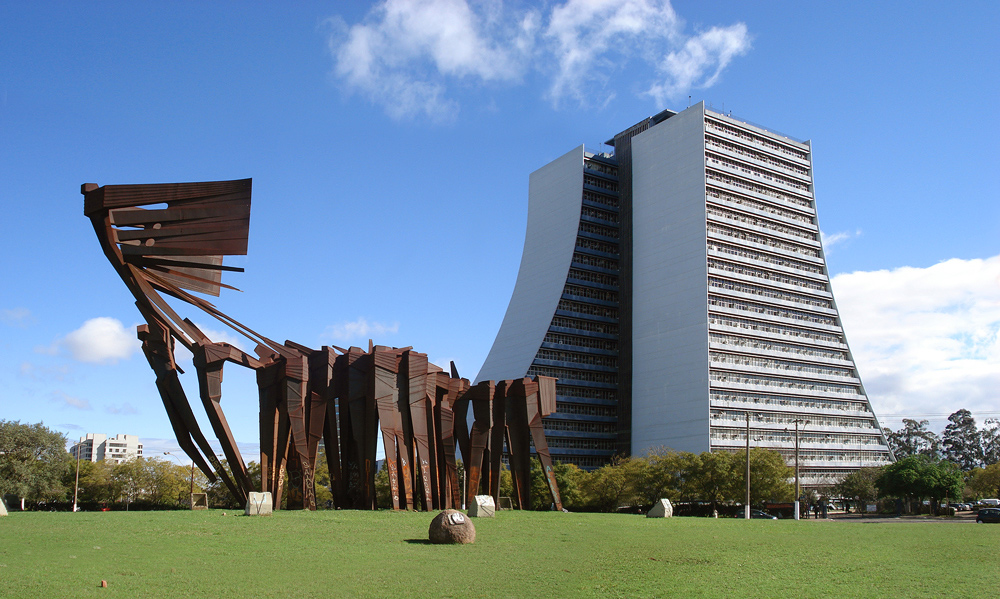
- Interactive map of the Monument to the Azoreans area

General information
- Location: Av. Loureiro da Silva, 1155, Porto Alegre, Brazil
- Coordinates: 30.03901°S 51.22955°W
- Inaugurated: March 26, 1974

Height
- Height: 17 m (56 ft)

Technical details
- Material: Steel
- Size: 24 m

Design and construction
- Architect: Carlos Tenius

The Monument to the Azoreans (Portuguese: Monumento aos Açorianos) is a public art monument in full time exhibition in Porto Alegre, state of Rio Grande do Sul, Brazil, in honor of the arrival of the first sixty Azorean couples that populated the city in 1752. It was inaugurated on March 26, 1974, in the city's 206th anniversary. The monument is 17 meters high and 24 meters wide.

This metallic sculpture is located in one of the most famous plazas in the city, the Azoreans' Plaza (Portuguese: Largo dos Açorianos), close to the State's administrative center. Built in 1973, made of steel and inspiried in futuristic aesthetic, it is an artwork created by the sculptor Carlos Tenius, and resembles a caravel, composed of intertwined human bodies and, in its front, a winged figure that resembles the mythological Greek character Icarus, representing the victory of reaching a new country having traveled through the sea.

The monument has an inscription reading "Never would those Azorean couples have dreamt that, from the seed they had thrown to the soil, the splendor of this city would grow."

== Location ==
The official location of the Monument to the Azoreans is in the Azoreans' plaza, where the Stone Bridge (Portuguese: Ponte de Pedra), sometimes called Azores' Bridge (Portuguese: Ponte dos Açores), itself an important historical monument for the Brazilian history, is also located. The plaza was originally built as part of the Guaíba lake embankment.

== Revitalization ==
In the middle of 2013 the monument was walled off by the city to protect it from vandalism. In 2016, the first phase of the plaza's restoration was started.

This monument's restoration was concluded in 2019, after 3 years of work. It included the revitalization of the plaza, as well a water mirror in two different levels connected by a small waterfall, plus a new illumination system. In the same year, the Porto Alegre city council released a public notice for adoption of the sculpture. The Order of Attorneys of Brazil adopted it, and committed to a 12-month term, with the possibility of a renewal when the term expires. In December 2020, the adoption was renewed for another year.
