= 2010 Rio Grande do Sul gubernatorial election =

- October 3, 2010
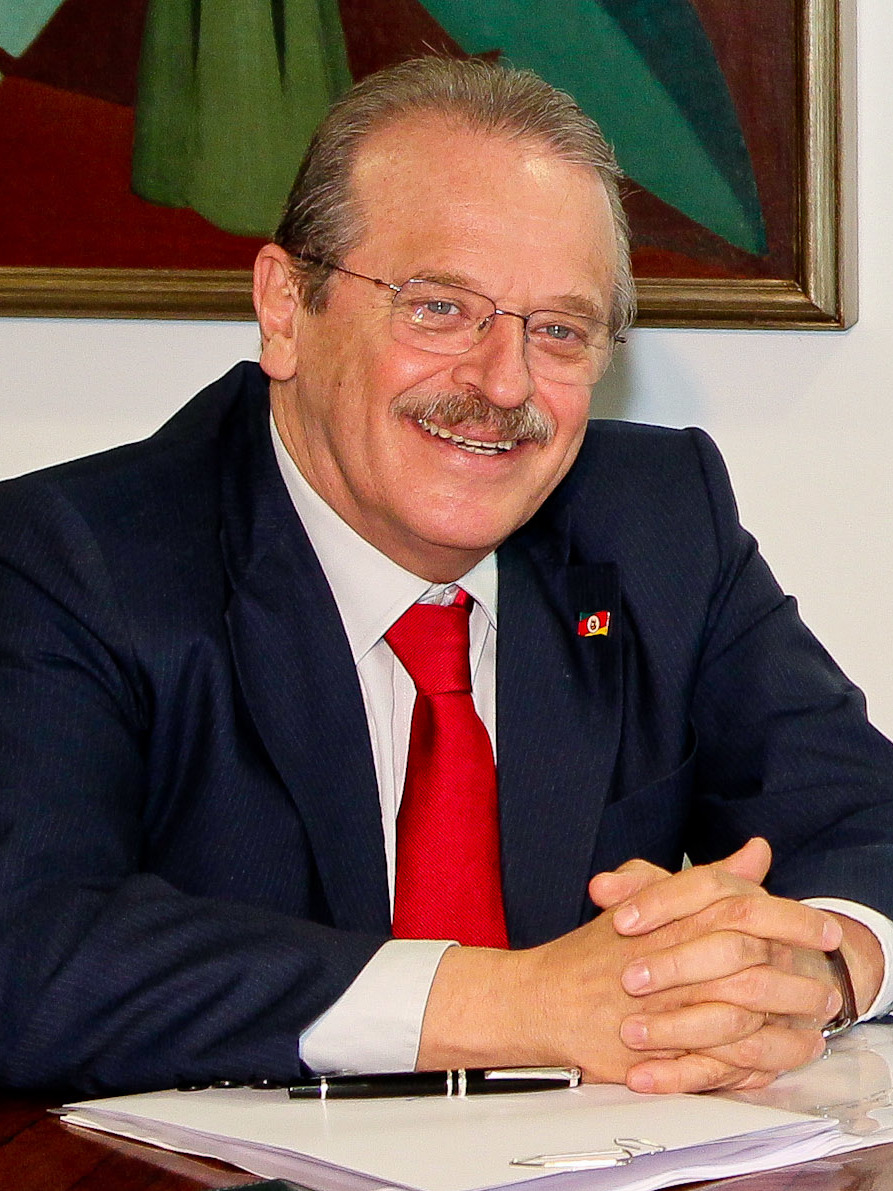

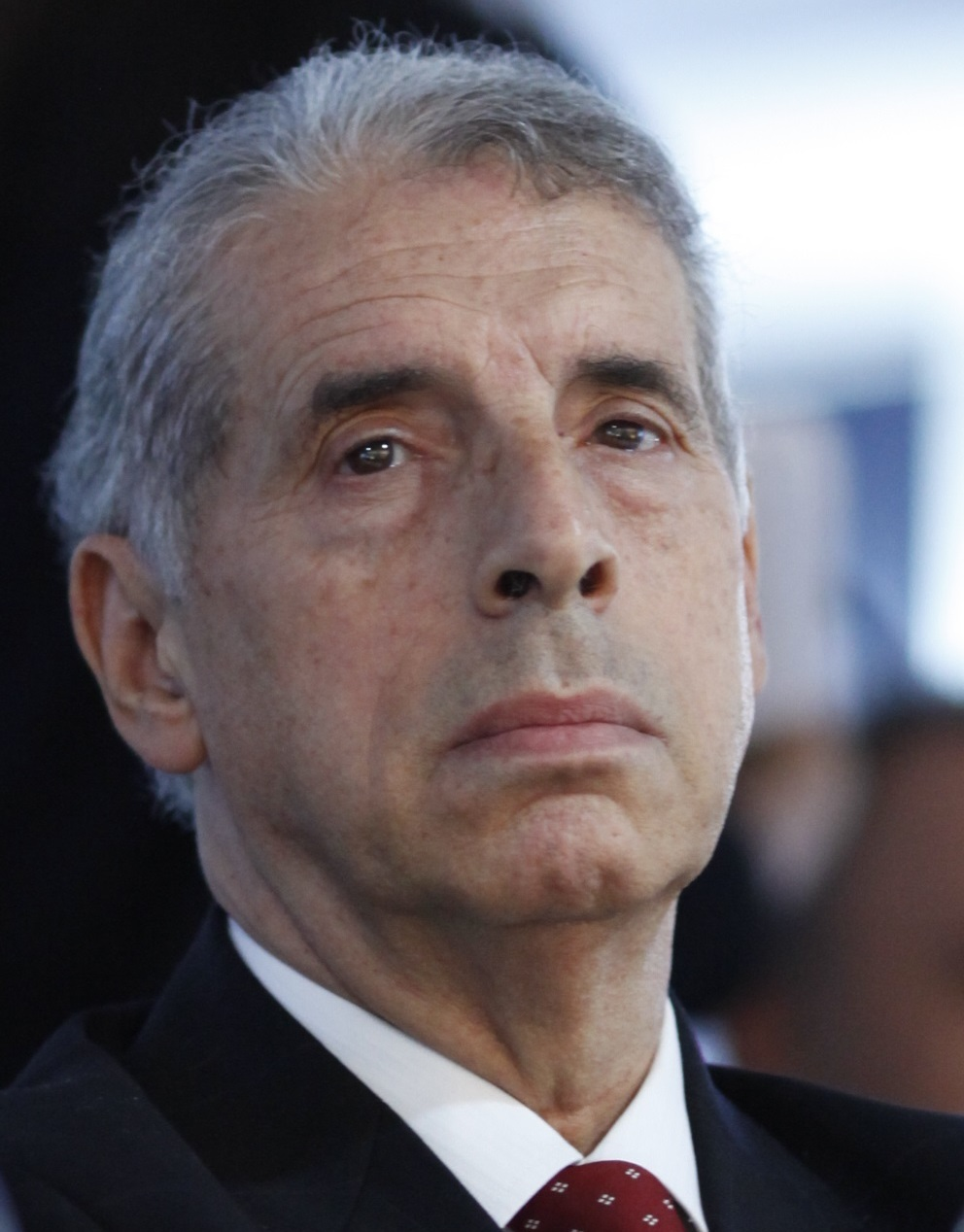

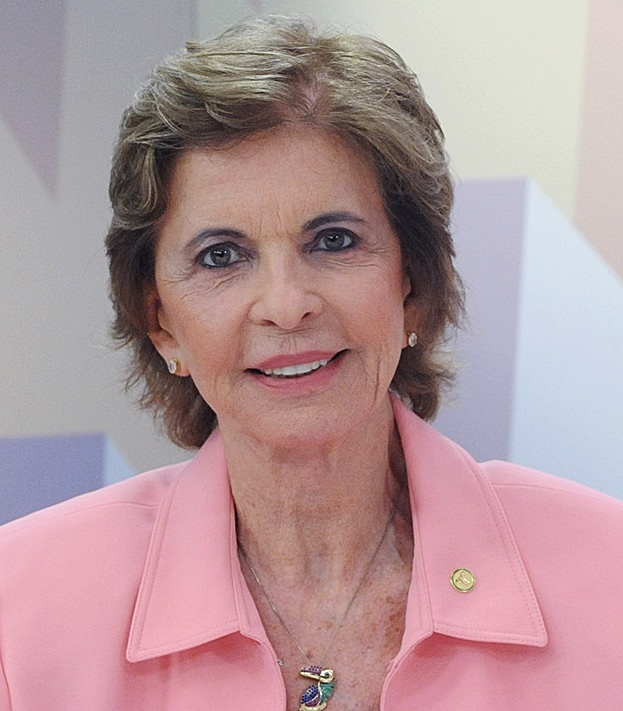
Nominee	Tarso Genro	José Fogaça	Yeda Crusius
Party	PT	MDB	PSDB
Running mate	Beto Grill	Pompeo de Mattos	Berfran Rosado
Popular vote	3,146,460	1,554,836	1,156,386
Percentage	54.35%	24.74%	18.40%
Governor before election
Yeda Crusius
PSDB
Elected Governor
Tarso Genro
PT

The state elections in Rio Grande do Sul in 2010 were held at the same time as Brazil's federal elections October 3. Since 1994, as a result of a constitutional amendment that reduced the presidential term to four years, all federal and state elections in Brazil are held on the same date. The state elections decide governors and the membership of the State Legislative Assemblies. Additionally, members of Congress are elected by the people of each state.

== The Election ==
The Democratic Labour Party (PDT) was divided between José Fogaça and Tarso Genro(supported by sectors linked to the City of Porto Alegre) and Tarso Genro (with the support of the Minister of Labour Carlos Lupi), decided to opt for Fogaça, since the party took over the City of Porto Alegre. The Progressive Party, which was divided between Beto Albuquerque, José Fogarty, Luis Augusto Lara and Yeda Crusius, decided to support the governor. The Socialist People's Party (PSP) by indicating that he had decided to support Yeda backtracked. According to the blog of journalist Polybius Braga, the Brazilian Republican Party (PRB) supported the reelection of Yeda Crusius. The Democrats (DEM) decided to integrate the candidacy of Luis Augusto Lara PTB. The Communist Party of Brazil (PCdoB) received proposals from the pre-applications for PT and the PSB, however, to support Mrs Manuela d'Ávila candidacy for mayor of Porto Alegre in 2012. The Progressive Party released the journalist Ana Amélia Lemos as a pre-candidate for the Senate. The PTB launched the candidacy of lawyer Luiz Francisco Correa Barbosa (Barbosinha) to the Senate. Jose Alberto Wenzel withdrew from the Senate race to run for a seat at the House of Representatives. Former vice-governor Vicente Bogo, journalist Adroaldo Streck and alternate state representative Mauro Sparta are the candidates of PSDB. Congressman Eliseu Padilha, aspirant to the Senate for the PMDB, dropped out of contention with Germano Rigotto. In the meeting, Congressman Beto Albuquerque announced that it is no longer pre-candidate for the State Government. The Brazilian Socialist Party (BSP) and Communist Party decided to support the candidacy of Genro. The socialist Grill Beto, former mayor and candidate for the State Government in 2006, is the candidate for lieutenant governor by the plate. The Republic Party, which had confirmed alliance with Lara, backtracked and decided to support Genro. The Communist Party chose Abigail Pereira, candidate for vice-mayor of Caxias do Sul in 2008 as a postulant to the Senate on the same plate of Paul Paim. After giving up the alliance with Yeda and have decided to support Luis Augusto Lara, the Socialist People's Party reattaches the alliance with the PSDB and indicates the running mate of Yeda. Ana Amélia Lemos is the only candidate for the Senate by the coalition. Luis Augusto Lara quit the application to the State Government by coalition PTB-DEM. The Christian Labour Party (PTC) withdrew the nomination of John Charles Robinson to the State Government to support Major Aroldo Medina, the Progressive Republican Party (PRP). Medina ran for Governor of the State in 2002 by Liberal Party. The Christian Social Democratic Party (PSC) Humanist Party of Solidarity (PHS) and Labour Party of Brazil (PTdoB) closed alliance with Yeda Crusius. The PTB, which is related to the DEM for Federal, withdrew the candidacy of Luiz Barbosa Francisco for Senate. The Communist Party tried to make a deal with the PSOL, but without success. Without the alliance, the Communists launched Humberto Carvalho as a candidate for the State Government. The Brazilian Labour Renewal Party (PRTB) registered the candidacy of José Guterres to the State Government, but the party has denied the registration application TRE. Coalitions have names already: Awakening Farrukhabad, Together by the Rio Grande, Popular Unity by Rio Grande and Rio Grande Confirms. Five applications were made without presenting coalition: Charles Schneider, the Party of National Mobilization (PMN), Humberto Carvalho, PCB, Julio Flores, the Unified Socialist Workers' Party (PSTU), Montserrat Martins, the Green Party (PV) and Peter Streets, the Party of Socialism and Liberty (PSOL).
