= Enio Verri =

Brazilian politician (born 1961)

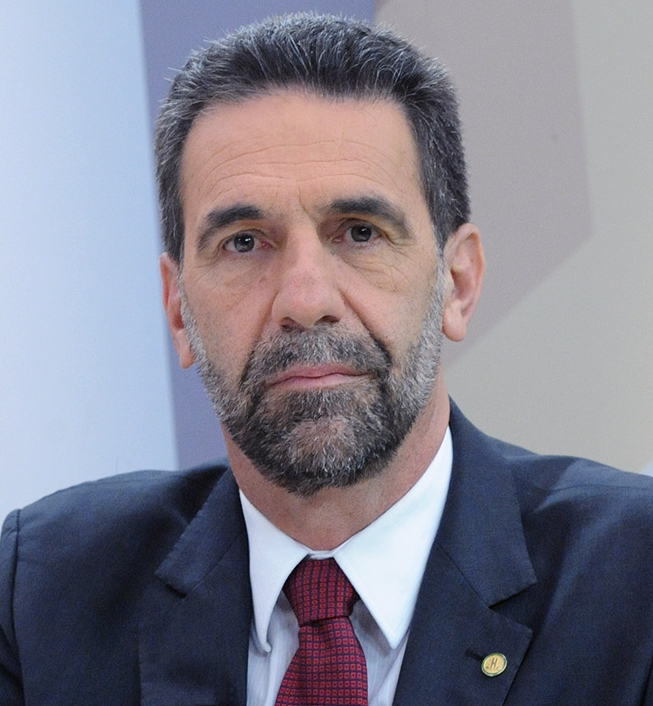
- Verri in 2017

Member of the Chamber of Deputies
- In office 1 February 2015 – 14 March 2023
- Succeeded by: Elton Welter
- Constituency: Paraná

Personal details
- Born: 27 March 1961 (age 65)
- Party: Workers' Party (since 1985)

Enio José Verri (born 27 March 1961) is a Brazilian politician serving as director general of Itaipu Binacional since 2023. From 2015 to 2023, he was a member of the Chamber of Deputies.
