= Parada Gráfica =

Parada Gráfica is a fair and festival for independent publishers and graphic artists. It happens every year in the city of Porto Alegre, Brazil, at Museu do Trabalho.

The first event took place in 2013, and was conceived and organized by Brazilian artists Nik Neves and Rafael Sica, together with Hugo Rodrigues (director and curator of Museu do Trabalho). It included a homage to artist Fabio Zimbres.

In 2014, the second edition took place, bringing together more than 40 exhibitors from South America. The festival attracted a large amount of public attention. This year, MZK was the artist who received a homage with a solo exhibition at Galeria Península.

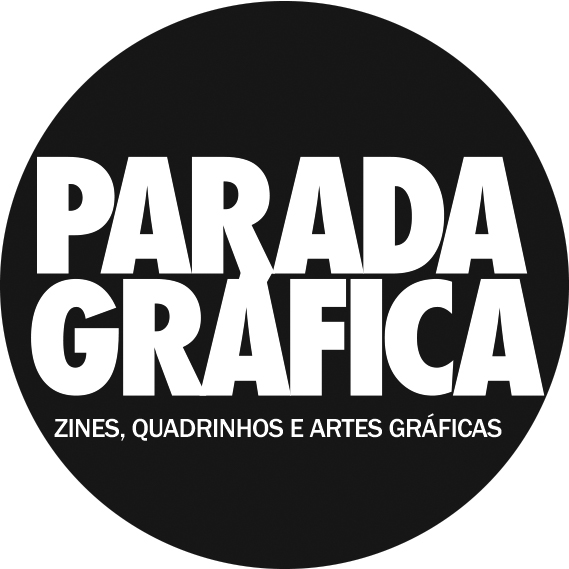

The third edition of Parada Gráfica was in 2015, growing more in numbers of participants and visitors.

Every year, there are open workshops dedicated to engraving and graphic arts in general.

Aligned with the global independent art scene, the city of Porto Alegre incorporated this event as one of the most relevant in its agenda.
