= 2006 Rio Grande do Sul gubernatorial election =

← 2002	1 October 2006 (first round); 29 October 2006 (runoff)	2010 →
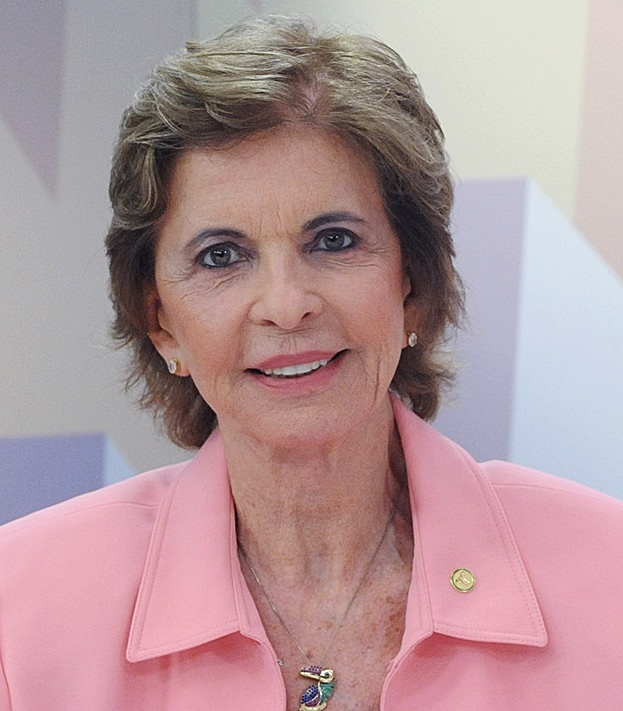

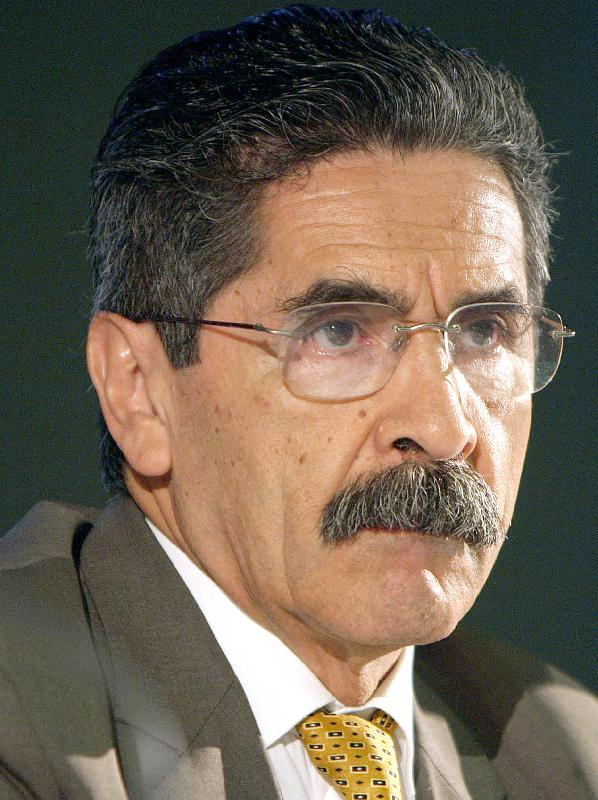
Nominee	Yeda Crusius	Olívio Dutra
Party	PSDB	PT
Running mate	Paulo Feijó	Jussara Cony
Popular vote	3,377,973	2,884,092
Percentage	53.94%	46.06%
Governor before election
Germano Rigotto
MDB
Elected Governor
Yeda Crusius
PSDB

Most major parties launched gubernatorial candidates for the 2006 elections in Rio Grande do Sul:

- PMDB: Incumbent governor Germano Rigotto in coalition with the PTB, which provided vice-gubernatorial candidate Sonia Santos. Rigotto finished third.
- PT: Former governor and Minister for the Cities Olívio Dutra in coalition with PC do B, which provided as vice-gubernatorial candidate the state deputy Jussara Cony. Olívio lost in the second round of vote.
- PSDB: Federal deputy and former Minister of Planning Yeda Crusius, in coalition of PPS, PFL and many smaller parties. Ms. Crusius won the election after a run-off.
- PDT: Federal deputy and former governor Alceu Collares
- PP: Former Minister for the Agriculture Francisco Turra
- Other parties to field candidates include PSOL, PSB, PCO, and PV.

== Opinion polls ==
Porto Alegre newspaper Correio do Povo published on 15 July 2006 an opinion poll with the following results:

- Germano Rigotto: 28.1%
- Olívio Dutra: 20.8%
- Yeda Crusius: 14.5%
- Alceu Collares: 9.6%
- Francisco Turra: 4.2%

A new poll was published by Correio do Povo on 23 September 2006:

- Germano Rigotto: 29.2%
- Olívio Dutra: 23.4%
- Yeda Crusius: 19.7%
- Francisco Turra: 6.0%
- Alceu Collares: 4.5%

In the end, Mr. Rigotto finished the first round in the third place, opening the way for a run-off between Crusius and Dutra, which the PSDB candidate won.
