= Parliamentary amendment =

Brazilian public budgetary process

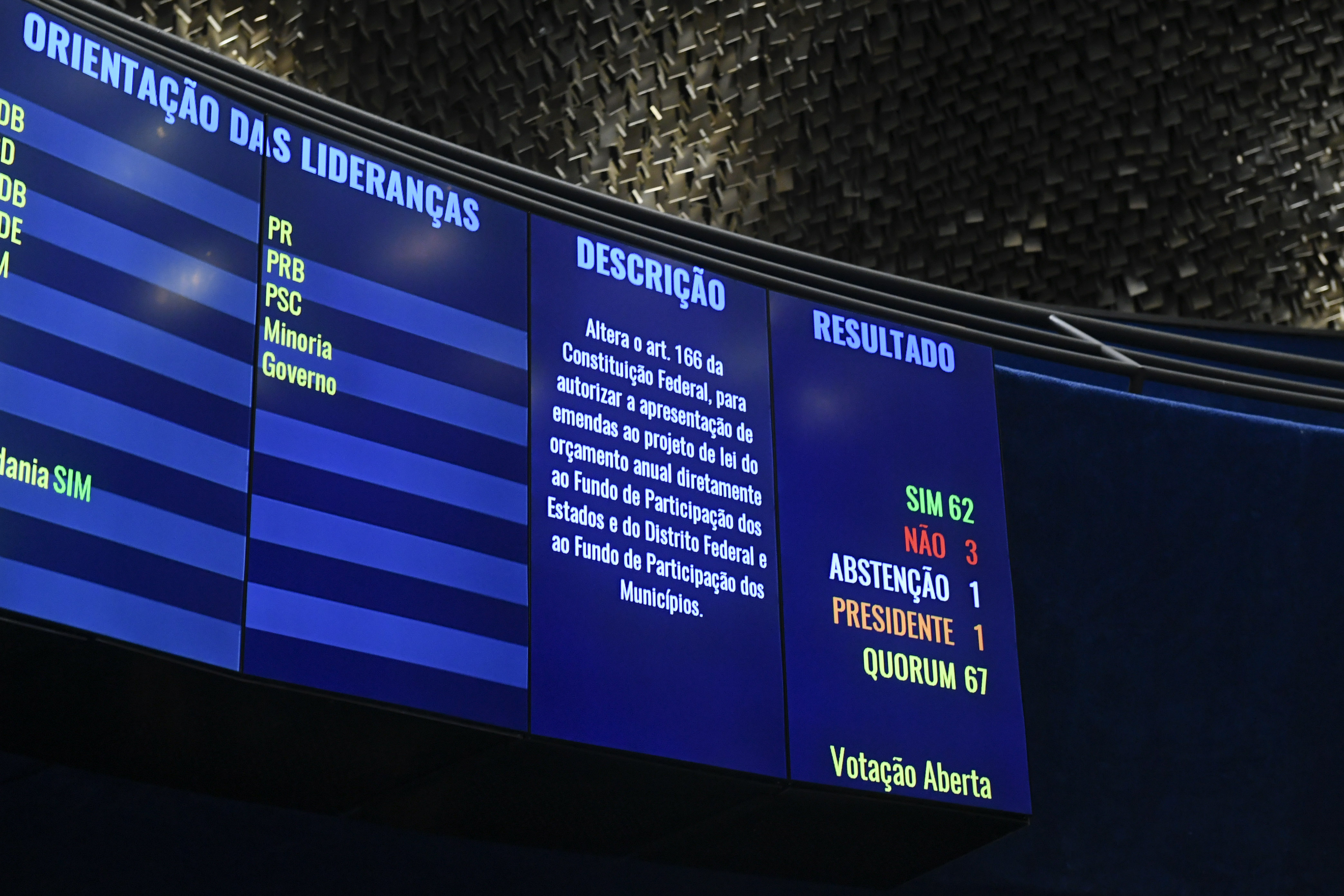
Voting on the budget in the Federal Senate.

In Brazilian politics, a parliamentary amendment (in Portuguese: emenda parlamentar) is a way of allocating public budget resources, legally indicated by members of the National Congress and state legislative assemblies for specific purposes, generally related to the thematic and electoral interests of each parliamentarian. These amendments are part of the General Budget of the Union (OGU) and are a way for parliamentarians to directly influence the allocation of public resources.

Before 2015, amendments were not mandatory, and the Executive could ignore the allocation given by parliamentarians. Constitutional Amendment No. 86, however, introduced the so-called mandatory amendments, which must be complied with by the Executive up to a percentage ceiling established by the Budget Guidelines Law (LDO). Congress expanded the process in 2019, also making the so-called "bench amendments" mandatory.

== Types of parliamentary amendments ==
- Individual: proposed by individual members of parliament. Since 2015, these amendments have become mandatory, meaning that the government is obliged to implement them, except in cases of technical impediments or legal justifications.
- Bench: Presented collectively by state or regional benches. They are aimed at projects that benefit more than one municipality or region of a state.
- By committee: Presented by the permanent committees of the Chamber or Senate. They seek to serve specific sectors, such as health, education, or infrastructure.
- Rapporteur's: proposed by the budget rapporteur, generally to meet interests negotiated between Congress and the federal government. These amendments are more controversial, due to their lack of transparency and their connection to the so-called secret budget.

== Criticism ==
Parliamentary amendments, although important for decentralizing resources and meeting local demands, face several criticisms, such as lack of transparency, use as an instrument of political negotiation between the government and Congress, lack of strategic planning, risk of regional inequality, dependence on municipalities and potential for irregularities.
