= Yeda Crusius =

Brazilian economist and politician (born 1944)

Yeda Rorato Crusius
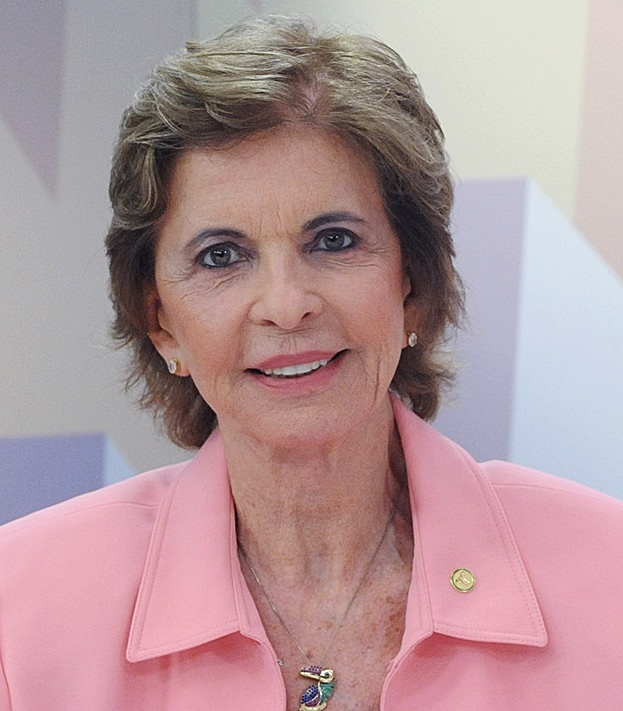
- Crusius in 2017

Federal Deputy for Rio Grande do Sul
- In office 5 January 2017 – 1 February 2019
- In office 1 February 1995 – 1 January 2007

Governor of Rio Grande do Sul
- In office 1 January 2007 – 1 January 2011
- Vice Governor: Paulo Feijó
- Preceded by: Germano Rigotto
- Succeeded by: Tarso Genro

Minister of Planning, Budget and Coordination of the Presidency
- In office 26 January 1993 – 10 May 1993
- President: Itamar Franco
- Preceded by: Paulo Roberto Haddad
- Succeeded by: Alexis Stepanenko

Personal details
- Born: 26 July 1944 (age 82) São Paulo, São Paulo, Brazil
- Party: PSDB
- Spouse: Carlos Augusto Crusius
- Occupation: Economist

Yeda Rorato Crusius (born July 26, 1944) is a Brazilian economist and professor who served as governor of the Brazilian state of Rio Grande do Sul from January 1, 2007, until December 31, 2010. She was the first female governor of the state. She wrote her autobiography.

== Background and political associations ==
She graduated in Economics from the University of São Paulo and Vanderbilt University. She has been living in Porto Alegre since 1970, when she married Carlos Augusto Crusius. In 1990, she joined PSDB. She directed the Faculty of Economics of the Federal University of Rio Grande do Sul, where she taught.

== Court cases ==
Crusius was accused of environmental crimes during her tenure as Rio Grande do Sul governor but was acquitted by Gilmar Mendes. She was also prosecuted for alleged corruption and money laundering activities in 2006 and 2010 involving the Odebrecht Group. This Brazilian conglomerate was accused of making payments for Crusius' congressional campaign. The In 2019, the 3rd Federal Court of Santa Maria, Rio Grande do Sul, convicted her for administrative misconduct over a fraud scheme that involved Rio Grande do Sul State Traffic Department (Detran-RS), the Technology and Science Support Foundation (Fatec), and the Educational and Cultural Foundation for Development.
