= Tarso Genro =

Brazilian politician (born 1947)

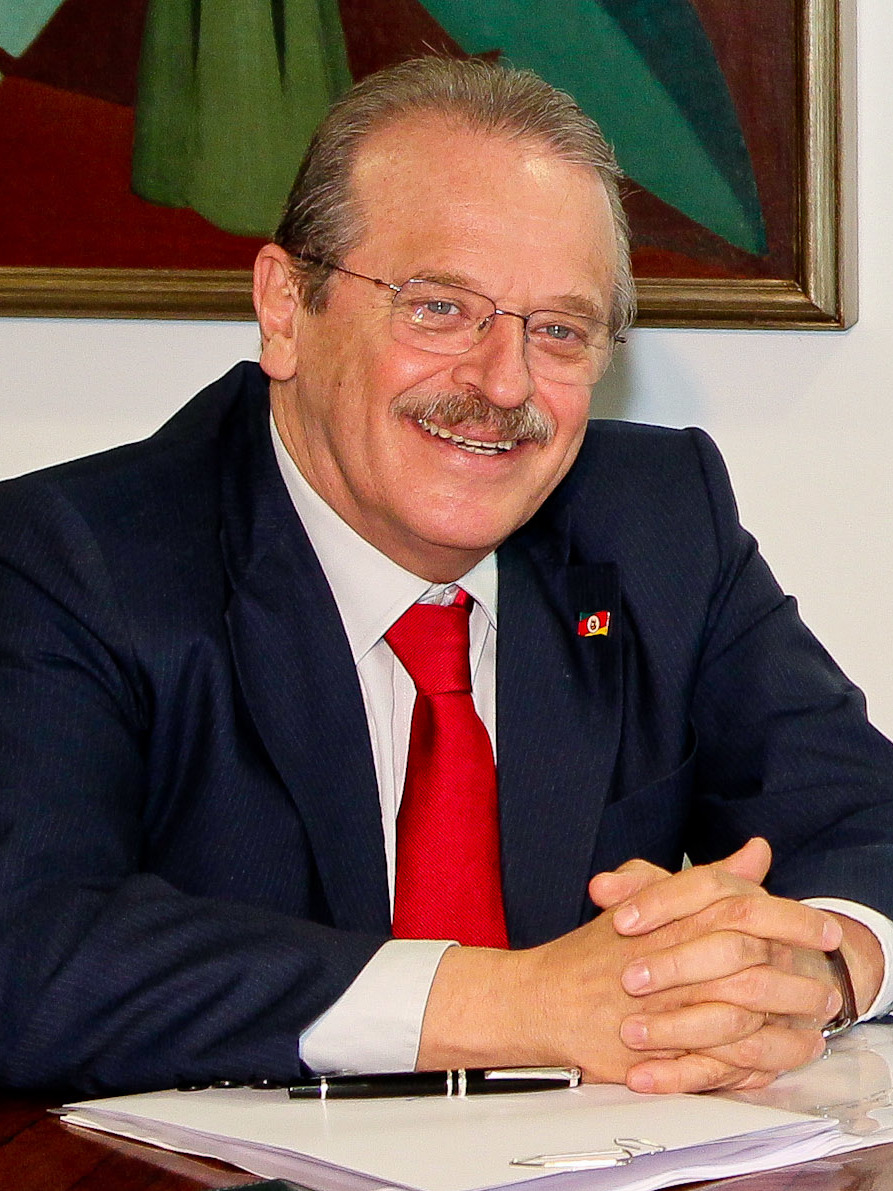

Governor of Rio Grande do Sul
- In office 1 January 2011 – 1 January 2015
- Vice Governor: Beto Grill
- Preceded by: Yeda Crusius
- Succeeded by: José Ivo Sartori
Other positions
Minister of Justice
In office 16 March 2007 – 10 February 2010
President	Luiz Inácio Lula da Silva
Preceded by	Márcio Thomaz Bastos
Succeeded by	Luiz Paulo Barreto
Minister of Institutional Relations
In office 3 April 2006 – 16 March 2007
President	Luiz Inácio Lula da Silva
Preceded by	Jaques Wagner
Succeeded by	Walfrido dos Mares Guia
National President of the Workers' Party
In office 9 July 2005 – 11 October 2005
Preceded by	José Genoino
Succeeded by	Ricardo Berzoini
Minister of Education
In office 27 January 2004 – 29 July 2005
President	Luiz Inácio Lula da Silva
Preceded by	Cristovam Buarque
Succeeded by	Fernando Haddad
Mayor of Porto Alegre
In office 1 January 2001 – 4 April 2002
Vice Mayor	João Verle
Preceded by	Raul Pont
Succeeded by	João Verle
In office 1 January 1993 – 1 January 1997
Vice Mayor	Raul Pont
Preceded by	Olívio Dutra
Succeeded by	Raul Pont
Federal Deputy for Rio Grande do Sul
In office 6 April 1990 – 1 February 1991
Constituency	At-large
In office 11 January 1989 – 2 March 1989
Constituency	At-large
Vice Mayor of Porto Alegre
In office 1 January 1989 – 1 January 1993
Mayor	Olívio Dutra
Preceded by	Glênio Peres
Succeeded by	Raul Pont

Personal details
- Born: 6 March 1947 (age 79) São Borja, Rio Grande do Sul, Brazil
- Party: PT
- Spouse: Sandra Krebs Genro
- Children: Luciana; Vanessa
- Education: Federal University of Santa Maria

Tarso Fernando Herz Genro (born 6 March 1947) is a Brazilian politician from the southern state of Rio Grande do Sul. An associate of Luiz Inácio Lula da Silva, Genro was a leader of the Workers' Party (PT) in the 2000s.

== Biography ==
=== Early years ===
Genro was born to a working-class family in São Borja, Rio Grande do Sul, Genro was active in politics from a young age. In the early 1980s, Genro was a spokesman for the Communist Revolutionary Party (PRC) along with his brother, Adelmo Genro Filho.

As a member of the Workers' Party (PT), he was elected deputy mayor of Porto Alegre by the "Popular Front". He accumulated the positions of vice mayor and government secretary. In 1992, Genro was elected to the position of Mayor of Porto Alegre, though he lost reelection in 1996. In 1998, he was speculated to be a potential presidential candidate for the PT in the place of Lula, though Lula ended up running

== Personal life ==
His daughter, Luciana Genro, is a socialist politician in Brazil who served as the presidential candidate of the Socialism and Liberty Party (PSOL) in 2014. Fernando Marcel Genro Robaina, his grandson, is a former Brazilian footballer.

Political offices
Preceded by Olivio Dutra	Mayor of Porto Alegre; 1993–1997; 2001–2002	Succeeded by Raul Pont
Preceded by Raul Pont	Mayor of Porto Alegre; 1993–1997; 2001–2002	Succeeded by João Verle
Preceded by Cristovam Buarque	Minister of Education; 2004–2005	Succeeded by Fernando Haddad
Preceded by Jaques Wagner	Minister of Institutional Relations; 2006–2007	Succeeded by Walfrido dos Mares Guia
Preceded by Márcio Thomaz Bastos	Minister of Justice; 2007–2010	Succeeded by Luiz Paulo Barreto
Preceded by Yeda Crusius	Governor of Rio Grande do Sul; 2011–2015	Succeeded by José Ivo Sartori
Political offices
Preceded by José Genoino	National President of the Workers' Party; 2005	Succeeded by Ricardo Berzoini
