= José Fogaça =

Brazilian politician (born 1947)

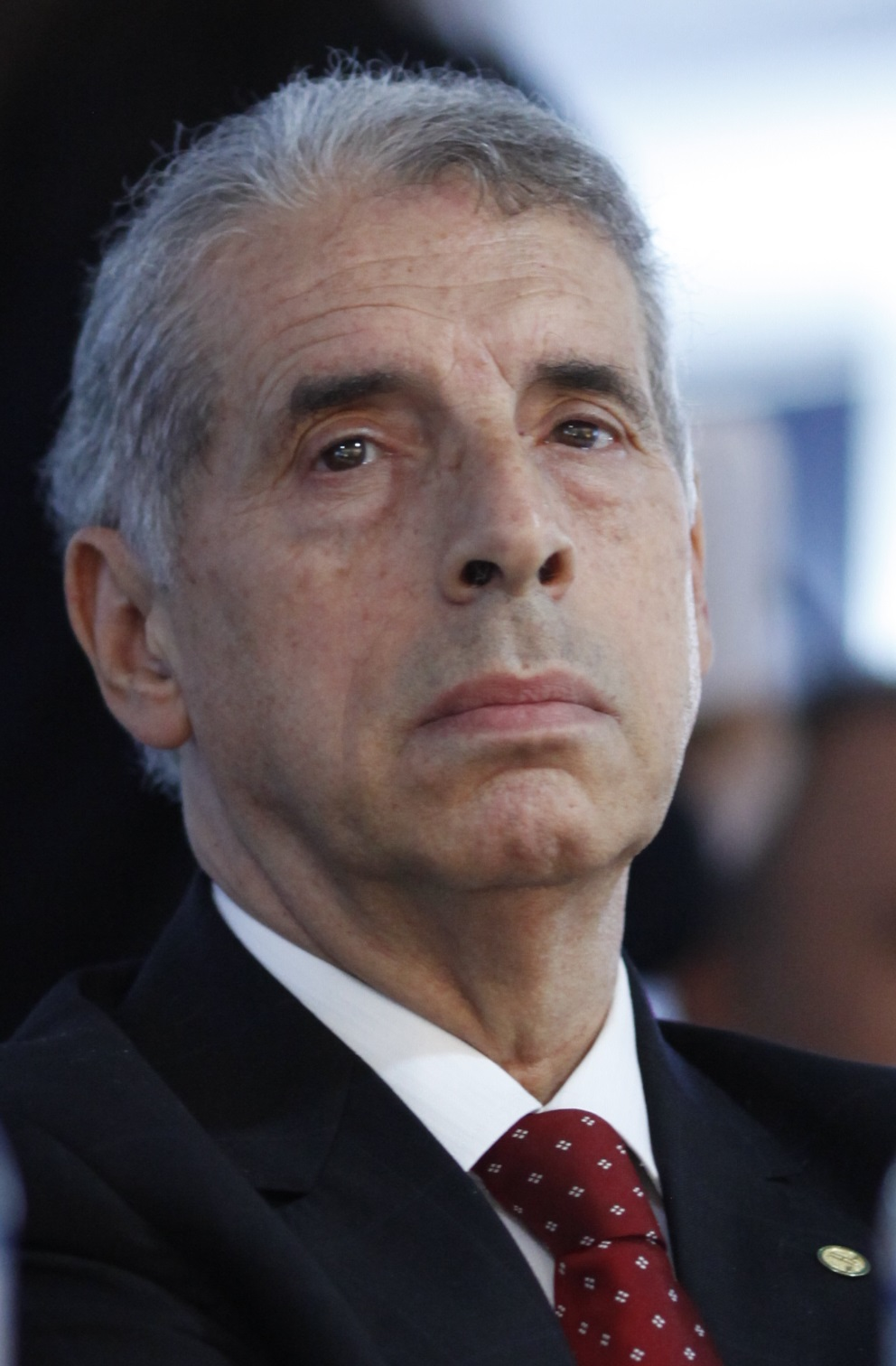
José Fogaça in November 2015.

José Alberto Fogaça de Medeiros (born 1947) is a Brazilian politician who has been the mayor of Porto Alegre, Brazil, a state deputy, federal deputy and senator.

He is a graduate of the Catholic University of Rio Grande do Sul and taught at the College of Rio Grande, before becoming a TV and print journalist.

He is a member of the PMDB, having been elected in 2004 as mayor on behalf of the Socialist People's Party. He has pledged to continue the participatory budgeting system introduced under the PT and his mandate expires in 2008.

He is married to the singer Isabela Fogaça.

== Political career ==
- 1979-1982: State Deputy, Rio Grande do Sul
- 1983-1986: Federal Deputy, Chamber of Deputies of Brazil
- 1987-2003: Senator, Senate of Brazil
- 2005-2009: Mayor of Porto Alegre

He is longlisted for the 2008 World Mayor award.

== See also ==
- List of mayors of Porto Alegre
- Timeline of Porto Alegre
