= Lipika Singh Darai =

Indian filmmaker, director and sound recordist

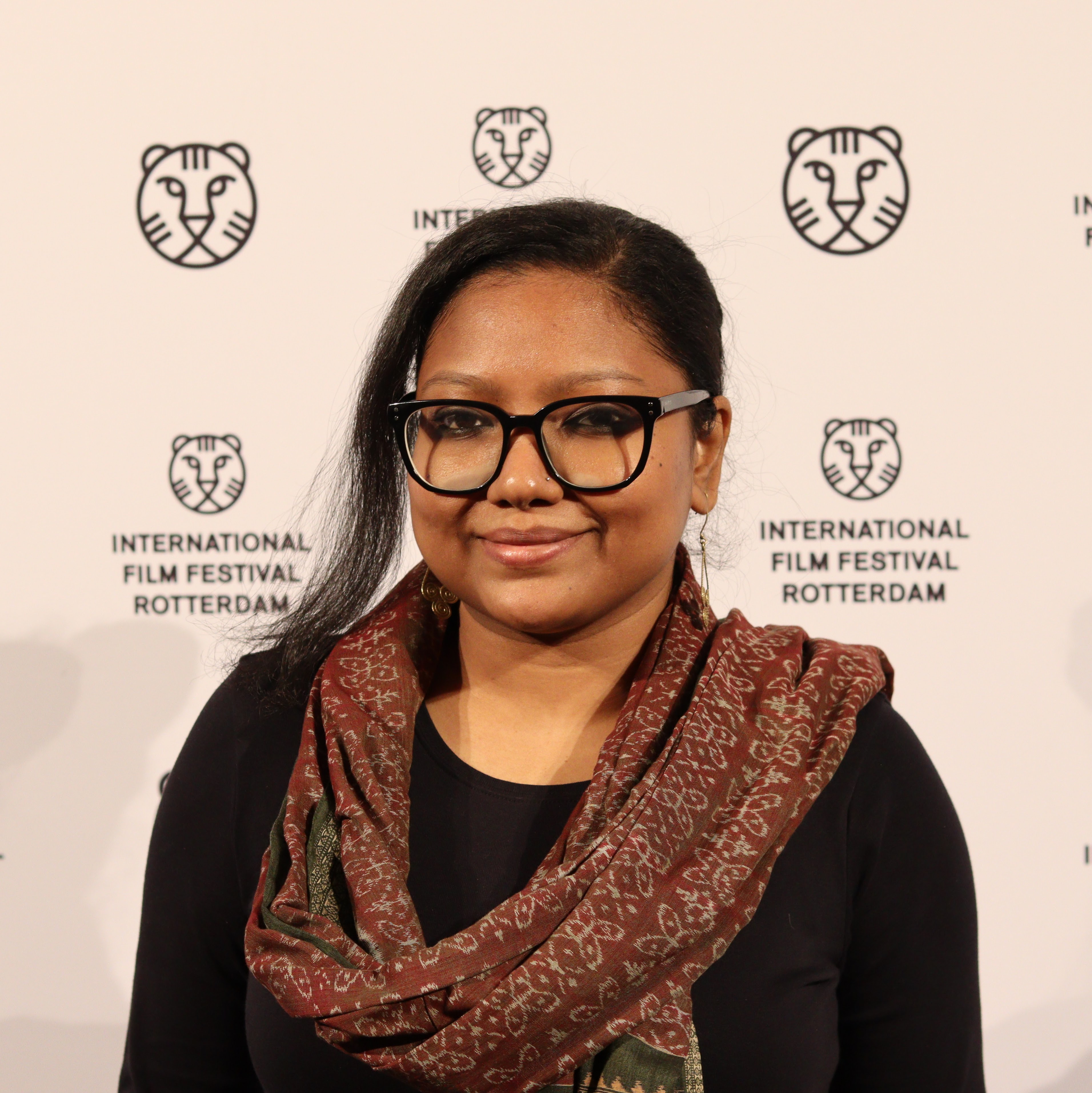
- Lipika Singh Darai at the IFFR 2023
- Born: Damasahi, Mayurbhanj district, Odisha, India
- Occupations: Filmmaker, Film Director, Film Editor
- Partner: Writer
- Awards: Four National Film Awards

Lipika Singh Darai is an Indian filmmaker, editor and sound recordist from Odisha. Lipika has received four National Film Awards for direction, sound recording, and narration in the non-feature section. Her documentary Night and Fear (2023) premiered at the International Film Festival Rotterdam in Ammodo Tiger Short competition. She is developing her debut fiction feature Birdwoman which has received the Hubert Bals Development Fund 2023. She is one of the ten creative talents in BAFTA Breakthrough-India 2023.

== Early life and education ==
Darai was born in Damasahi, Odisha, India to both parents from the Ho indigenous community. She is based in Bhubaneswar.

Darai graduated from Film and Television Institute of India (FTII) in 2010, specialising in sound recording and design.

== Career ==
=== Recording ===
Darai started her career as a sound recordist for a Hindi short film Gaarud, receiving the 57th National Film Awards for audiography in 2010 in the non-fiction category when she was a student at FTII.

=== Direction ===
In 2012, Darai directed her debut film Eka Gacha Eka Maṇisha Eka Samudra (English: A Tree a Man a Sea) in Odia. In 2014, she made film essay Kankee O Saapo (Dragonfly and Snake) which won the National Film Awards in the narration / voice-over category. In 2015, she directed Some Stories Around Witches, produced by Public Service Broadcasting Trust, a film about the humanitarian crisis surrounding the cases of witch-hunts in Odisha, India. Her short fiction film The Waterfall (2017), produced by LXL Ideas, made for schools across India, focuses on the struggle to protect a dying waterfall and received the National Award for Best Educational Film. In 2021, she directed Backstage. This Odia film depicts different styles of puppetry of Odisha highlighting the work of master rod-puppeteer Maguni Charan Kuanr, Rabana Chhaya / Shadow puppeteers of Odash village (Ravan Chhaya Natya Sansada Team) , Gouranga Charan Dash (Shadow Pupeeteer), Sakhi Kandhei Nacha puppeteers (glove puppeteers) Abhay Singh, Parameshwar Singh, Sridhar Singh, Kedar Singh and Team, as well as the string puppeteers of Ganjam District, including Chaitanya Behera and his team. The film also tries to look at these puppeteers' art forms in the context of the caste system in India. In 2023, she made her second film essay called Raati o Bhaya (Night and Fear) produced by writer/producer Subravanu Das.

=== Art and Research Projects ===
Lipika assisted Indraneel Lahiri in a year long Research Project (2012-2013) on Puppetry of Odisha. The research work was conducted with a fellowship under National Folklore Support Centre, Chennai.

Lipika was selected among various Artists across India for a project called Listening to the city under City as Studio Programme (2013) by the Centre for the Study of Developing Societies's Sarai Project.

Lipika participated in Seoul Biennale of Architecture and Urbanism in 2017as a filmmaker and Visual Artist with her film essay Dragonfly and Snake.

Lipika authored the essay "Making Films from and about the Margins" in Resistance in Indian Documentary Film, published by Edinburgh University Press, in 2024, a book that explores various forms of resistance in contemporary Indian documentary cinema.

== Filmography ==
Year	Films	Language	Role	Producer	Awards	
2010	Gaarud	Hindi, Maratthi	Audiographer	FTII		
2012	A Tree a Man a Sea	Odia	Director	Veenu Bhushan Vaid	National Film for Best Debut Film of a Director (Non-Feature Category)	
2014	Kankee O Saapo	Odia	Director/Editor	Indranaal Lahiri	National Film Award for Best Narration/voice-over (Non-Feature Category)	
2015	Some Stories Around Witches	Odia	Director/Editor	PSBT, India		
2016	In the Shadow of Time	Odia	Editor	IGNCA		
2017	The Waterfall	English, Odia and Hindi Version	Director/Editor	LXL Ideas, India	National Film Award for Best Educational Film (Non-Feature Category)	
2018	The Sound Man Mangesh Desai	Hindi, English	Editor	WIMPTSEA		
2021	Backstage	Odia	Director/Editor	Films Division, India		
2023	Night and Fear	Odia	Director/Editor	Subravanu Das		
2023	B and S	Odia, English	Director/ Cinematographer/ Editor	Rough Edges		yet to be released
