= Atchutapuram pharmaceutical factory explosion =

2024 industrial disaster in Southern India

- Date: August 21, 2024
- Time: 2:15 p.m. (IST)
- Location: Andhra Pradesh Industrial Infrastructure Corporation campus, Anakapalli, Visakhapatnam, Andhra Pradesh, India
- Cause: Reported electrical fire
- Deaths: 18+
- Injuries: 41+

An explosion at an Escientia Advanced Sciences pharmaceutical manufacturing facility in the Atchutapuram Special Economic Zone in the Anakapalli district near Visakhapatnam in Andhra Pradesh on 21 August 2024 killed at least 18 people. Fifty more were injured.

== About the Factory ==
Essential is an Indian pharmaceutical manufacturing company that constructs active pharmaceutical ingredients as well as intermediary products. The 40-acre facility unit was constructed on the Andhra Pradesh Industrial Infrastructure Corporation campus with a ₹200 crore budget and began production in April 2019.

Around 400 workers made up of two shifts were working in the factory at the time of the explosion.

== Explosion ==
At around 2:15 p.m. IST on 21 August 2024, an explosion believed to be caused by an electrical fire occurred at the facility. Due to the explosion occurring at lunchtime, a much higher casualty number was averted. At least 18 people were killed in the explosion and resulting fire, while 41 more suffered injuries, of which several were described as "severe chemical burns".

Several fire engines were dispatched to put out the resulting fires, and 13 people trapped inside the facility were rescued. Thick smoke surrounding the facility impeded rescue and fire extinguishing operations.

== See also ==
- List of explosions
- 2024 Rajkot gaming zone fire
- 2024 Thane explosion
- 2024 Virudhunagar explosions
