= 2024 Lonavala waterfall tragedy =

- Date: 30 June 2024; 2 years ago
- Location: Lonavala, Maharashtra, India
- Deaths: 5

The 2024 Lonavala waterfall tragedy occurred on June 30, 2024, when five people, including four children, were swept away by sudden flooding near a waterfall close to Bhushi Dam in Lonavala, Maharashtra, India.

== Tragedy ==
On the day of the incident, 16–17 family members from Sayyad Nagar in Pune’s Hadapsar area were having a picnic near the waterfall. The group trekked about 2 km up the hilly area adjacent to the Bhushi Dam.

Due to intense rainfall, the water level rose suddenly, catching the picnickers off guard. Ten people were swept away by the strong currents, but five were rescued by nearby villagers and official rescuers.

== Response and safety measures ==
Following the incident, the Pune district administration imposed prohibitory orders at several popular picnic spots, including Bhushi Dam and the Pavana Dam, to ensure the safety of tourists. These orders were effective from July 2 to July 31, 2024.

Additional safety measures include the deployment of lifeguards, installation of warning signs, and strict monitoring of visitor activities in hazardous areas.

== Public reaction ==
The tragedy led to widespread grief and raised concerns about the safety of popular tourist destinations in the region. Locals and tourists alike called for better safety infrastructure and more stringent regulations to prevent such incidents in the future.

The incident also prompted discussions on social media about the responsibility of tourists to heed safety warnings and the need for authorities to enforce safety protocols more rigorously.
