= ITL Cosmos Group =

United Arab Emirates business conglomerate

The ITL Cosmos Group is a business conglomerate based in Dubai, U.A.E. that was founded in 1953. The group was led by the Chairman, Dr. Ram Buxani, a veteran NRI entrepreneur.

== History ==
ITL was founded in 1953. In 1958, within 5 years, it obtained a Decree of Incorporation from the late Ruler of Dubai and Prime Minister of the United Arab Emirates, Sheikh Rashid Bin Saeed Al Maktoum and is the first Company in Dubai to receive this royal decree. This was during the time when Dubai was still a part of the Trucial States. Even as of 1959, it had only four employees in this small outpost office led by Mr. Murij Manghnani, and ran as a subsidiary unit of the Intra Group. In fact, Intra Group was linked to the Chotirmall Group, a large trading corporation established in 1875 and based in Hong Kong, that mainly operated in Asia-Pacific and particularly Japan and South-East Asian markets such as Indonesia and Singapore.

During the early 1950s, ITL focussed only on textile business, specializing in textiles imported from the Far East (primarily from Japan, China and India) and exporting them mainly to Iran and the region. Later on, ITL diversified into other businesses, such as authorized distributors of products from foreign companies. In 1960, ITL opened its first Cosmos department store in Dubai, that later on became the group's flagship chain of stores. The group had been official distributors of the Japanese brands Sharp, Minolta, Rhythm, Remington Products, and TDK for several decades. In the 1970s, the group diversified into hospitality and food business, and later on into IT. Eventually, by the 21st century, the group revamped its business strategies and streamlined its operations multiple times, in order to stay afloat despite the intense competition fueled by Dubai's rapid rise as a global city.
