= 2024 Jivitputrika tragedy =

Drownings in Bihar during Hindu festivities

- Date: September 26, 2024
- Location: Bihar, India
- Type: Drownings during ritual ceremonies
- Cause: 2024 India floods, festivities occurring outside of state-designated ghats
- Deaths: 46 (37 children, 7 women)

The 2024 Jivitputrika tragedy refers to the drowning of at least 46 people, most of whom were children, in rivers and bodies of water that had flooded with ongoing torrential rainfall on 26 September 2024. The deaths occurred across 15 districts in Bihar located in eastern India during the festivities of Jivitputrika.

== Background ==
Jivitputrika is a three-day-long Ancient Hindu festival which is celebrated from the seventh to ninth lunar day of Krishna-Paksha in Ashvin month primarily in the Indian states of Uttar Pradesh, Bihar and Jharkhand. The festival involves a tradition of mothers fasting without water for well-being of their sons, after which they travel to bodies of water where they bathe, immerse the branches of sacred fig tree in a river or stream, and put a flower garland on the neck of their child who often accompanies them to the water.

Concurrently with Jivitputrika festivities in 2024, significant monsoon rainfall impacted multiple regions of India, causing widespread flooding and the swelling of rivers and other bodies of water such as the Kopili, Barak, and Kushiyara. Hundreds of thousands of civilians were displaced by flooding and hundreds more were killed as a result of flooding.

== Tragedy ==
The Bihar Disaster Management Authority reported on 26 September 2024 that at least 46 people had been killed after drowning or being swept away in swollen rivers and bodies of water while engaging in rituals. Of those killed, 37 were children and seven were women.

Victims were reported in the districts of Arwal, Aurangabad, Buxar, East and West Champaran, Gopalganj, Kaimur, Muzaffarpur, Nalanda, Patna, Rohtas, Samastipur, Saran, Siwan, and Vaishali. Aurangabad district reported eight deaths, the highest total as of 26 September. Seven drowned in Kaimur district, four of whom were teenagers. In Saran, Kalyanpur village reported five deaths while Chhapra reported the drownings of five children. Motihari in East Champaran reported five drownings in the Somvati River by the Kalyanpur block. Five drowned in Patna, four of whom were women, and four girls were swept away and drowned in the Sone River. A women and her child drowned together in a pond in Vrindavan.

== Responses ==
The Bihar State Government announced that 400,000 rupees (US$4,784) would be given to the families of victims as compensation.

District Magistrate of Aurangabad Srikant Shastri stated that while Bihar state had prepared staff to manage and oversee state-designated ghats of bodies of water where Jivitputrika festivities were assigned to, he stated that drownings occurred in non-designated bodies of water by local ghats. District Magistrate of Saran Aman Samir insisted that all celebrators go to designated ghats for festivities to prevent potential drownings. An anonymous Bihar Disaster Management Authority official said that many of the participants had ignored the dangerously elevated water levels, resulting in the tragedy.

Many families of the deceased blamed disaster management organizations for not deploying crowd management staff by any of the locations where victims drowned. Rashtriya Janata Dal spokesperson Mrityunjay Tiwary expressed disdain towards the state government for not arranging emergency staff and resources to all ghats where festivities were taking place instead of only deploying to state-designated locations.
