= 2024 Surat building collapse =

2024 accident in Surat, India

- Date: 6 July 2024
- Location: Surat, Gujarat
- Cause: Building collapse
- Deaths: 7
- Injuries: 15

On 6 July 2024, following heavy rains, a residential building collapsed on the outskirts of Surat in the Indian state of Gujarat. Seven people were killed and more than 15 were injured.

== Incident ==
At 14:30 IST on 6 July 2024, a residential building collapsed on the outskirts of Surat in Gujarat. The six storey building collapsed following heavy rains. Seven people were killed and more than 15 were injured in the accident.

== Aftermath ==
Search and rescue operations were carried out by the National Disaster Response Force (NDRF) and the local authorities. The rescue operations continued to the next day to try and rescue people who were trapped in the rubble.

== Investigation ==
Government authorities informed that the building had been constructed illegally in 2017 and only five families were occupying the building. The owners of the building were booked under the Bharatiya Nyaya Sanhita.
