= Koushal Kishor Mishra =

Indian political scientist (1957–2024)

Dr. Kaushal Kishor Mishra
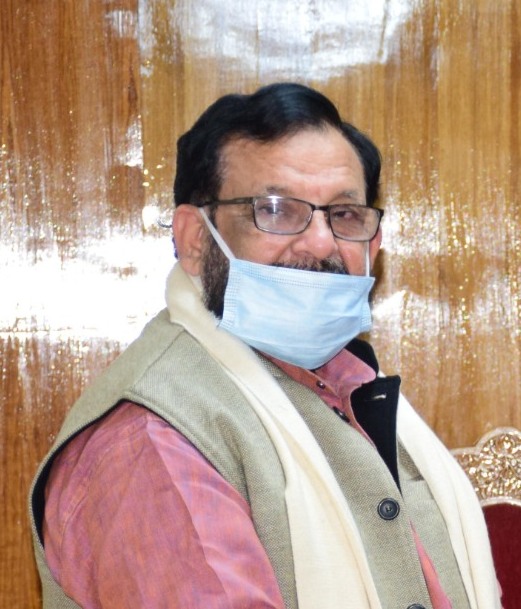
- Mishra in 2022
- Born: 1 May 1957
- Died: 10 October 2024 (aged 67); Varanasi, Uttar Pradesh, India
- Occupations: Former Dean & Professor
- Title: Dr.

Academic background
- Education: Banaras Hindu University
- Thesis: Manusmriti Mein Rajtantra (transl. Monarchy in Manusmriti)

Academic work
- Discipline: Social Science
- Sub-discipline: Political Science
- Institutions: Banaras Hindu University
- Main interests: Ancient & Modern Indian Political Thought; Indian government and Politics; Political Journalism

Kaushal Kishore Mishra (or Koushal Kishor Mishra; 1 May 1957 – 10 October 2024) was an Indian academic who was professor of political science at the Banaras Hindu University (BHU). He was formerly the Dean (27th) of the Faculty of Social Sciences, Banaras Hindu University, preceding Arvind Kumar Joshi. Previously, he has been the head of the department of Political Science at Faculty of Social Sciences, Banaras Hindu University from 2014 to 2017. He has been the chair of the Pandit Deen Dayal Upadhyay Chair. He edited the Indian Journal of Political Science from 2016 to 2018.

K.K. Mishra had been in media because of a number of controversial statements.

== Education ==
K.K. Mishra was a 1977 graduate of political science from the Banaras Hindu University, from where he also got his M.A. in political science with gold medal for first position in 1979. He earned his PhD from his alma mater Banaras Hindu University in the year 1984 on the topic Manusmriti Mein Rajtantra (transl. Monarchy/Government Administration in Manusmriti).

== Controversies ==
=== Cow dung cake 'training' ===
In February 2022, a video was posted on Twitter by the Dean, Faculty of Social Science (Mishra), with caption "Students learning the skill of making Upla from cow dung". In the video posted by Mishra's official account, he was seen sitting among students of the Integrated Village Development Centre at a workshop on the subject. This drew flak from social media users as the art of making Upla from cow dung has already been prevalent in the rural parts of India, and as they criticized the "wasteful expenditure" of taxpayers' money on "futile deeds".

On 11 February 2022, Sanghmitra Maurya, BJP, the ruling party's Member of Parliament raised in Lok Sabha to question and condemn this conduct of K.K. Mishra, without naming him, as per parliamentary rules. She also demanded action against him.

=== Nita Ambani Professorship ===
In March 2021, a controversy stirred when some local media reported quoting Koushal Kishor Mishra that Nita Ambani shall be joining the Banaras Hindu University as a visiting professor. However, as the news gained popularity, Nita Ambani's Reliance Industries issued a press statement saying that they have not received any such proposal, nor any such decision has been made. Simultaneously, Banaras Hindu University's Public Relations Office issued a press release denying local news reports. It was later clarified by Koushal Kishor Mishra, with evidence of communication with the Reliance Industries that a proposal in this regard was indeed sent from his office, i.e. the Office of Dean.

=== Ravish Kumar's Allegations ===
In February 2019, Mishra was accused by journalist Ravish Kumar of allegedly publishing his and others' mobile number publicly on social media with a malicious intention. In his Facebook post, Koushal Kishor Mishra had shared number and asked his followers to 'congratulate them' for being 'anti-India'.

=== GST in Kautilya's Arthashashtra ===
In 2017, Mishra introduced a question in postgraduate semester examination asking students to write an essay on the nature of GST in Kautilya's Arthashastra. This was objected to by some students and public, however, Mishra defended himself by saying "So what if these are not in the textbook? Isn’t it our job to find newer ways to teach?"

=== Attack on Somnath Bharti ===
Koushal Kishor Mishra was arrested in May 2014 for allegedly instigating attack on Aam Aadmi Party leader Somnath Bharti. He was later released on two personal surety bonds on the same day.

== Death ==
Mishra died from a lung infection at the Sir Sunderlal Hospital of Institute of Medical Sciences, Banaras Hindu University, on 10 October 2024, at the age of 67, due to Pneumonia.

== Books ==
K. K. Mishra authored several books on political science, including:

- Rāmacaritamānasa Mein Rāma-rajya (transl. Welfare state (Ramrajya) in Ramcharitmanas)
- Mahabharat Mein Raj-Dharma (transl. State's duty in Mahabharat)
- Manusmriti Mein Rajtantra (transl. Democracy in Manusmriti)
- भारतीय राजनीति में: पं दीनदयाल उपाध्याय और भारतीय जनता पार्टी का योगदान (transl. Contribution of Pandit Deen Dayal Upadhyay and Bhartiya Janta Party in Indian politics)
