= Usha Kiran Khan =

Indian writer (1945–2024)

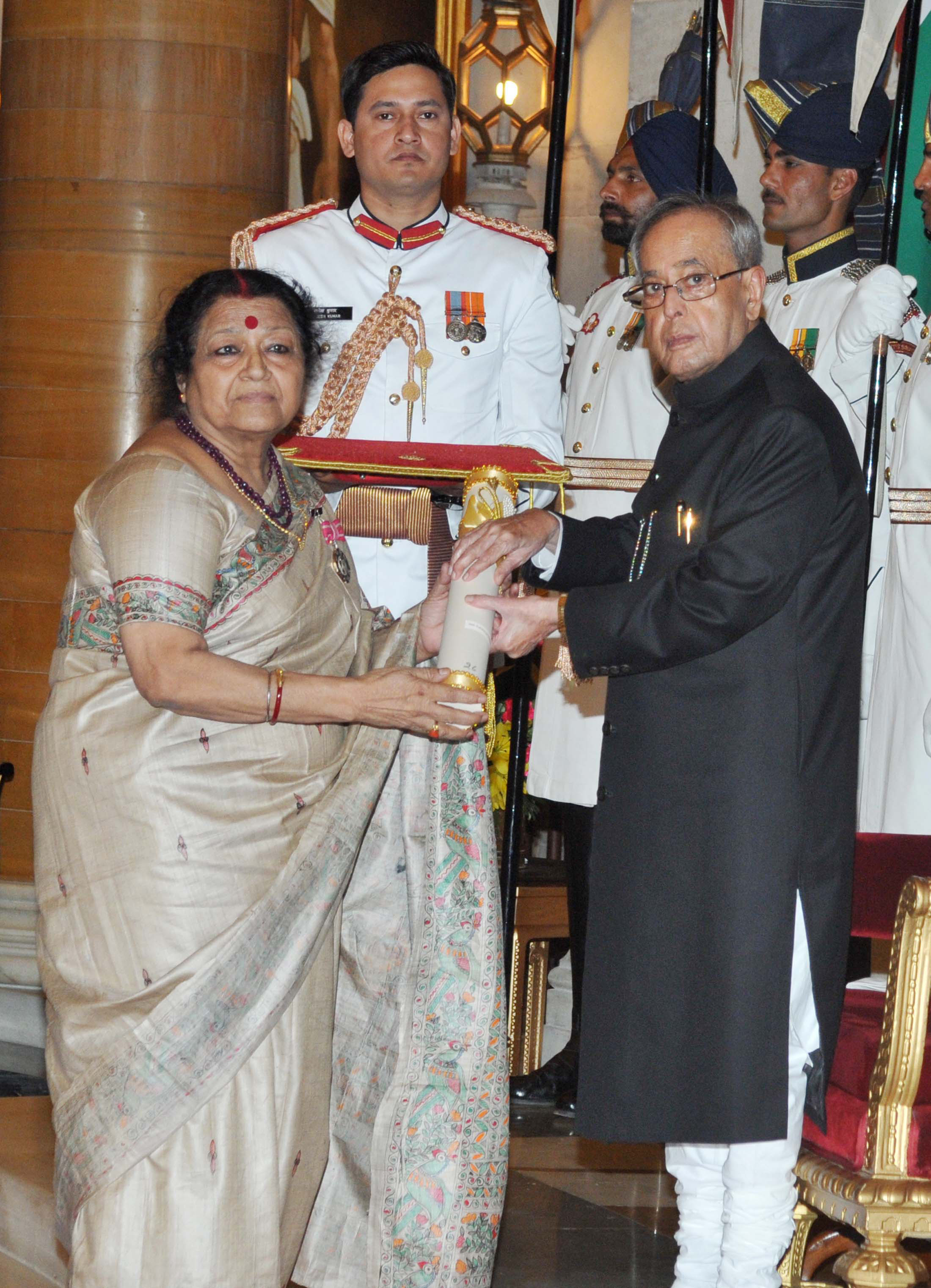
- Born: 24 October 1945
- Died: 11 February 2024 (aged 78)
- Spouse: Ram Chandra Khan
- Writing career
- Language: Hindi and Maithili
- Notable works: Bhamati: Ek Avismaraniya Premkatha; Sirjanhaar
- Notable awards: Padma Shri, Hindi Sevi Samman (Department of Official Language, Government of Bihar), Mahadevi Verma Samman (Bihar Official Language Department), Dinkar National Award, Sahitya Akademi Award, Kusumanjali Award, Vidya Niwas Mishra Award

Usha Kiran Khan (also known as Ushākiraṇa Khāna and other variants, 24 October 1945 – 11 February 2024) was an Indian writer who worked in the Hindi and Maithili languages. She was also an academic historian.

== Career ==
Of her writing influences, Usha said: "My great idol and role model for my inclination towards Maithli language is the noted writer and novelist Nagarjun. He has penned many novels, stories and poems and Maithli language and also he has been my guru from whom I have learned the beauty of this language" and "Nagarjun is like father like figure to me and his style of writing has always influenced me a lot."

== Personal life and death ==
Usha Kiran Khan was married to Ram Chandra Khan, who served the Indian Police Service from 1968 to 2003, and had four children.

Khan died at a private hospital in Patna, Bihar, on 11 February 2024, at the age of 78.

== Awards and honours ==
In 2011, Usha won a Sahitya Akademi Award for the Maithili novel Bhamati: Ek Avismaraniya Premkatha. The award is presented by Sahitya Akademi, India's National Academy of Letters.

In 2012, she was awarded a Kusumanjali Sahitya Samman by the Indian Council for Cultural Relations for her novel Sirjanhaar. This was the first year that the awards had been given and they included a purse of Rs. 2,50,000.

Khan was awarded the Padma Shri in 2015 for her service in the field of literature and education.

She was awarded Bharat Bharti Puraskar by Uttar Pradesh Hindi Sansthan, Lucknow in 2018. She has also been awarded Vanmali Kathashirsh Puraskar posthumously in February 2024.
