= 2024 Bengaluru cafe bombing =

2024 bombing in Bangalore, India

Bengaluru cafe bombing
- Security camera footage of Rameshwaram Cafe Bombing in Bengaluru, India. 1 March 2024
- Location: 12.970736°N 77.712537°E; Whitefield, Bengaluru, Karnataka, India
- Date: 1 March 2024; 12:55 PM (UTC+05:30)
- Target: Rameshwaram Cafe, Whitefield Branch
- Attack type: Bombing
- Weapon: Improvised explosive device
- Deaths: 0
- Injuries: 9
- No. of participants: 4
- Accused: Mussavir Hussain Shazib; Maaz Muneer Ahmed; Muzzammil Shareef; Abdul Matheen Ahmed Taaha

On 1 March 2024, two terrorists belonging to ISIS, Mussavir Hussain Shazib and Abdul Mateen Taha, planted an improvised explosive device (IED) inside a bag at the Rameshwaram Cafe in Bengaluru, India. The bomb detonated and at least eight people were injured and taken to hospital, though none were in critical condition.

== Bombing ==
The blast occurred at 12:55 PM (UTC+05:30) at the Rameshwaram Cafe's Whitefield branch. It was caused by a low-intensity IED.

== Investigation ==
Initially, the Bengaluru Police registered a case under the Unlawful Activities (Prevention) Act and the Explosive Substances act. Even though a gas leak was suspected as the cause of the blast, the fire department ruled it out in the beginning itself. After checking CCTV visuals, Siddaramaiah, the chief minister of Karnataka confirmed that the explosion was caused by an improvised explosive device (IED). He also said that a man was seen placing a bag containing the IED in the cafe.

On 4 March 2024, National Investigation Agency (NIA) registered a first information report (FIR) following a direction of the Ministry of Home Affairs (MHA). The NIA released a photo of the suspect wearing a cap, mask and eyeglasses and offered ₹10 lakh (US$10,000) as reward for information on the blast suspect. The suspect was later identified by NIA as Mussavir Hussain Shazib, who hails from Thirthahalli, Karnataka. His accomplice was identified as Abdul Mateen Taha, who also hails from Thirthahalli. Taha was also a part of Islamic State (ISIS) module in Shivamogga and was wanted for the murder of a Tamil Nadu police inspector named K. Wilson.

On 12 April 2024, the NIA arrested Shazib and Taha from their hideout in Kolkata. After the bombing, both of them had travelled through different routes and used different identities to escape from the law enforcement agency. Both of them were planning to leave Kolkata when NIA officials arrested them. NIA said that Shazib had placed the bomb at the cafe and Taha was the mastermind of the blast.

On 9 September 2024, NIA chargesheeted the four individuals, further revealing that Shazib and Taaha were absconding since 2002 after the Al-Hind module was busted. They had earlier planned to migrate to ISIS territories in Syria and were actively recruiting youth into the ISIS ideology.

Taaha and Shazib were funded through cryptocurrencies by their handlers, these funds were used to carry out various acts of violence including a failed IED attack on the BJP State Office on 22 January and the ultimately the blast at Rameshwaram Cafe in March.
