= Mahesh Chandra Guru =

Indian academic (1957–2024)

B.P. Mahesh Chandra Guru (31 January 1957 – 17 August 2024) was an Indian academic who was Professor of Journalism and Mass Communication at the University of Mysore. He was the first Dalit-Buddhist media studies professor in India.

Known for making controversial statements, Guru has publicly defended and supported beef fests, and has been called 'anti-Ram' and a 'Ram-critic' for his statements against Hindu god, Rama. As an activist, Guru openly criticised Brahmanical hegemony.

Guru died on 17 August 2024, at the age of 67.

== Education and career ==
Guru was born on 31 January 1957. He did a BA and MA in Journalism and Mass Communication from the University of Mysore in 1978 and 1980, respectively. He earned a doctorate degree (PhD) in the same from University of Mangalore in 1999. Guru was previously a research associate at National Institute of Rural Development, and has worked as a lecturer at University of Bangalore and as a reader at University of Mangalore.

== Controversies ==
In January 2015, Karnadu Sarvodaya Sena, a Hindutva organisation, lodged a police complaint against Guru for making derogatory and insulting remarks against Lord Ram. On 17 June 2016, a Mysore court remanded Guru in judicial custody but he was released on bail 21 June. Guru was temporarily suspended by the University of Mysore for the same remarks in 2016.

In 2015, Prof. Guru, along with other three professors, had participated in an event where Bhagwad Gita, a Hindu scripture which is part of Epic Mahabharata, was burnt. In the aftermath of the incident, the Vishwa Hindu Parishad (VHP) registered a case of "hurting religious sentiments" against Prof. Guru, Prof Arvindamgatti, Prof. Bhagwan, and Prof Bangere Mahesh.

In 2022, Guru criticised the Karnataka state government for wasting money by funding and granting land to Karnataka Samskrit University.

=== Mahishasura Dasara ===
In 2015, Guru called Mahishasura, a mythological demon killed by Hindu Goddess Mahishasurmardini or Chandmundeshwari, a Buddhist king and a symbol of human values, equality and justice. He asserted that Mahishasura is being falsely projected as a demon with fictitious stories, and his real name was Mahisha who was ruled Mahisha Mandala.

In 2018, Guru conducted prayers near the Mahishasura statue atop Chamundi Hills, Karnataka. These celebrations are called 'Mahisha Habba' or 'Mahisha Dasara' by the followers. In 2020, after resistance in conducting Mahisha Habba, Guru warned the government not to halt the celebrations.
