= Paliath Ravi Achan =

Indian cricketer (1928–2024)

Personal information
- Born: 12 March 1928; Chendamangalam, British Raj
- Died: 1 April 2024 (aged 96); Thrippunithura, India
- Batting: Right-handed
- Bowling: Right-handed fast-medium or leg-spin
- Role: All-rounder
- Relatives: K Ram Mohan (son); P. Balachandran (nephew)

Domestic team information
- Years: Team
- 1952–1957: Travancore-Cochin cricket team
- 1957–1969: Kerala

Career statistics
Competition	First-class
Matches	55
Runs scored	1107
Batting average	11.53
100s/50s	0/3
Top score	70
Balls bowled	8188
Wickets	125
Bowling average	34.67
5 wickets in innings	7
10 wickets in match	0
Best bowling	6/34
Catches/stumpings	30/–
- Source: Cricinfo, 6 February 2021

Paliath Ravi Achan (12 March 1928 – 1 April 2024) was an Indian cricketer who represented Travancore-Cochin and Kerala in domestic first-class cricket. He was a right-handed batsman and right-arm medium-pacer.

== Career ==
Achan was the eldest male member of the Paliam royal family of Cochin. He did his B.Sc. at the Annamalai University in Chidambaram. Achan's Ranji Trophy debut came for Travancore-Cochin against Mysore in Thiruvananthapuram in 1952. It was Travancore-Cochin's second-ever Ranji match. He scored 43 in the match and was the team's highest scorer. When the Travancore-Cochin cricket team was renamed Kerala in 1957, after the formation of Kerala state, Achan played for Kerala.

Achan retired from domestic cricket at the age of 41. His career-high score is 70 which came in his last game against Madras in 1969, while his best bowling figures (6-34) came in 1960 against Andhra Pradesh. He also played in Tripunithura's Pooja tournament, one of the world's oldest limited-overs tournaments. Achan played 55 first-class matches for Travancore-Cochin and Kerala teams from 1952 to 1970. Primarily a leg-spinner, he took 125 wickets and scored 1107 runs. He was the first Kerala cricketer to complete the double of 1000 runs and 100 wickets. He also captained Kerala in several games. The best spin bowler award presented by the Kerala Cricket Association is named after him.

== Death ==
Achan died in Thrippunithura, Ernakulam district on 1 April 2024, at the age of 96.
