= A Valentine's Day =

- Directed by: Roheet Rao Narsinge
- Written by: Roheet Rao Narsinge
- Produced by: Fairoz Anwar Majgaonkar; Amjad Hussain Nirale; Shrikant Dharamdev Singh
- Starring: Fairoz Majgaonkar; Ashwini Kulkarni; Suresh Vishwakarma; Sanjay Khapare; Arun Kadam; Abhijit Chavan; Chaitali Chavan; Adeen Majgaonkar
- Cinematography: Sainath Mane; Sagar Kacchawa; Debutta Priya
- Edited by: Atharva Mule
- Music by: Allen KP; Niranjan Pedgaonkar; Sai Piyush
- Production company: Golden Stripes Entertainment
- Distributed by: GMV Pictures Pvt LTD
- Release date: 21 June 2024
- Running time: 127 minutes
- Country: India
- Language: Marathi

A Valentine's Day is a Marathi film directed by Rohitrao Narasinghe and Fairoz Majgaonkar. A Valentine's Day was produced under the banner Joker Entertainment. The music of this film was composed by Ellen KP and it starred Fairoz Majgaonkar, Arun Kadam, Sanjay Khapare, Abhijit Chavan and Chaitali Chavan in lead roles. The film was released in India on 21 June 2024.

== Cast ==
- Ashwini Kulkarni as Acp Ananya Khanolkar
- Fairoz Majgaonkar as Joseph Wisky
- Sanjay Khapare as Police Commissioner
- Arun Kadam as Santosh
- Abhijit Chavan as Chief minister
- Chaitali Chavan as guest appearance
- Suresh Vishwakarma as Munna
- Adeen Majgaonkar as Joseph (Childhood)
- Sangram Deshmukh as Raghu
