= Kamala Pujari =

Indian tribal woman (1949/1950–2024)

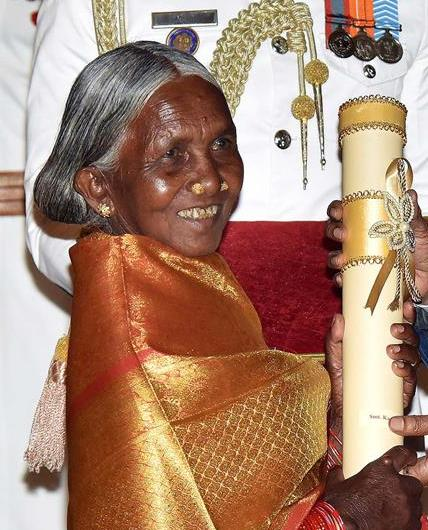
- Pujari in 2019
- Born: 1949/1950; Koraput District, Orrisa, India
- Died: 20 July 2024 (aged 74); Cuttack, Odisha, India
- Known for: Promoting organic farming
- Awards: Padma Shri (2022)

Kamala Pujari (1949/1950 – 20 July 2024) was an Indian tribal farmer from Koraput in Odisha, India. She was known for promoting organic farming. Interested in traditional farming, she learned the basic techniques from MS Swaminathan Research Foundation at Jeypore and contributed a lot in the field of organic farming. She was awarded India's fourth highest civilian award, the Padma Shri.

== Biography ==
Kamala Pujari, a tribal lady of Patraput Village, 15 km from Jeypore, near Boipariguda, Koraput District, Odisha, preserved local paddies. In her lifetime she preserved hundreds of indigenous varieties of paddy. Conserving paddy and promoting organic farming was not a pastime for her. After getting into this, she mobilized people, arranged group gatherings, and interacted with people to shun chemical fertilizers. She called many people to join with her and knocked door to door from village to village. Her efforts were successful and farmers in Patraput village and neighbouring villages gave up chemical fertilisers. Without having any basic education, Kamala preserved 100 types of paddy to date. Ms Pujari has collected endangered and rare types of seeds such as paddy, turmeric, tili, black cumin, mahakanta, phula, and ghantia. She was also known for having persuaded villagers in her area to shun chemical fertilisers and adopt organic farming for better harvest and soil fertility. She was an inspiration for the upcoming generations.

Pujari died at a hospital in Cuttack, on 20 July 2024, after going into cardiac arrest. She was 74.

== Achievements ==
In 2017, then Chief Minister Naveen Patnaik named the newly-built women's hostel of Odisha University of Agriculture and Technology (OUAT) after her name. Odisha University of Agriculture and Technology (OUAT) in Bhubaneswar was named after Kamala. She won the Equator of Initiative Award in 2002 at Johannesburg. The Odisha government honoured her as the best woman farmer in 2004. She was also awarded by the national award "Krusi Bisarada Samman" in New Delhi.

She held the unique distinction of being the first tribal woman to be included in the list of members of the Odisha State Planning Board. She was made a member of the five-member team in March 2018 that makes a five-year plan for the state apart from providing short- and long-term policy guidelines.
