= Snehlata Deshmukh =

Indian academic administrator (1938–2024)

Vice Chancellor of University of Mumbai
- In office 1995–2000

Personal details
- Born: 30 December 1938 Ahmednagar, Bombay Province, British India
- Died: 29 July 2024 (aged 85)
- Occupation: Academic, doctor
- Known for: Paediatric surgery

Snehlata Shamrao Deshmukh (also spelt as Snehalata, 30 December 1938 – 29 July 2024) was an Indian academic administrator who was the Vice Chancellor of the University of Mumbai from 1995 to 2000, as well as the dean of the Sion hospital. She was an eminent paediatric surgeon in India, and was considered a pioneer and one of the founders of the neo-natal department of KEM Hospital.

Snehlata Deshmukh was born on 30 December 1938. She was a co-opted member of Governing Council at the prestigious Tata Memorial Centre, a grant in aid institution under the Administrative control of Department of Atomic Energy, Government of India. Deshmukh died on 29 July 2024, at the age of 85.
