= Manjari Bhargava =

Indian diver (1956 – 2024)

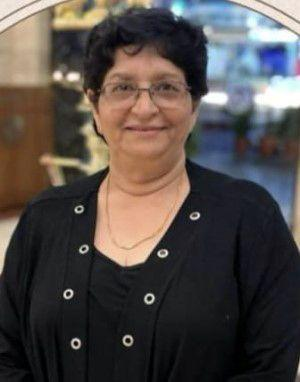
- Manjari in her 60s
- Born: 18-01-1956; Rajasthan
- Died: 05-11-2024 (aged 68); Pune
- Education: Postgraduation in History
- Alma mater: Government College of Ajmer
- Occupation(s): Diver, Professor, Entrepreneur
- Known for: Diving, Swimming, Women entrepreneurship
- Children: 2
- Awards: Arjuna Award

Manjari Bhargava (18 January 1956 – 5 November 2024) was an Indian diver. She was awarded Arjuna Award by Government of India in 1974 for excellence in diving. Bhargava hailed from Rajasthan state. She died from a brain tumor in Pune on 5 November 2024, at the age of 68.
