= Rafat Saeed Qureshi =

Indian writer (1946–2024)

Rafat Saeed Qureshi (10 October 1946 – 12 July 2024) was an Indian Urdu writer hailing from Aurangabad, Maharashtra. He wrote more than a 100 articles, features, reviews and translated stories from English to Urdu. His work is mostly on culture, tourism, history and monuments. An activist in the field of history and monuments, Qureshi promoted Aurangabad at the national level through his Radio talks on Akashwani (All India Radio). He was also a regular talker on Akashwani. He also conducted series of talks on various monuments of India.

== Biography ==
Rafat Qureshi was born on 10 October 1946. He came from a traditional Handicraft family of Himroo. His father Abdul Hameed Qureshi owned a Himroo showroom and factory which was the only tourist shopping attraction from 1900 to late 1990s. Abdul Hameed Qureshi brought a revolution in the textile industry by implementing more innovative methods of producing the Himroo fabric.

Qureshi died in Canada on 12 July 2024, at the age of 77.

== Work ==
Qureshi wrote articles, reviews of books in various magazines and newspapers. His first book Mulk-E-Khuda Tangneest published from Delhi, is a travelogue. The book also contains the world heritage places in Aurangabad, Ajanta, Ellora, as well as local historical sites like Quile-e-Arc built by Aurangzeb and narrates interesting events in the palace.

Qureshi’s later book titled Tazkire Ujaalo Ke is a book that incorporates different chapters on personalities, translations, reviews, history, and humour, as well as reviews on his work by some of the most celebrated names in Urdu literature.

== Sources ==
- Eastern Book Corporation
- Historic cities of India@ Bagchee.com
