= Toshen Bora =

Indian footballer (1950–2024)

- Bora in the 1970s

Personal information
- Date of birth: 14 February 1950
- Place of birth: Naharkatiya, Assam, India
- Date of death: 14 September 2024 (aged 74)

Senior career*
Years	Team	Apps	(Gls)
1969–1973	Assam		

International career
1971–1972	India		
- * Club domestic league appearances and goals

Toshen Bora (14 February 1950 – 14 September 2024) was an Indian footballer from Assam. Toshen Bora's football career reached its peak in 1972 when he was selected to represent India in pre-Olympic qualifying matches. He was also chosen for the Indian team for a Soviet Union tour in 1970, but injuries prevented him from participating.

== Personal life ==
Born on 14 February 1950, in Borbam Rangolipathar near Namrup, Dibrugarh, Bora showed his football talent from a young age.

Bora died on 14 September 2024, at the age of 74.

== Career ==
He began his journey while still in Class 7 and by 1963–64, he was already invited to the North East India training camp. In 1964, at just 14, he was named the best player of the junior inter-district football tournament. He quickly rose to prominence, playing for the Dibrugarh senior team and serving as vice-captain of the Assam school team in the National School Tournament in Shillong.

Bora is regarded as one of the best footballers from Assam.
