= Pappammal =

Indian organic farmer (1914–2024)

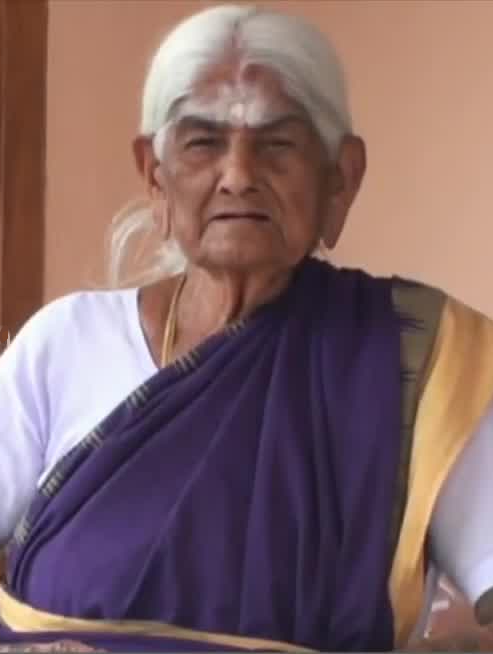
- Pappammal in 2021
- Born: 1914; Devalapuram, Coimbatore, Madras Presidency, British India
- Died: 27 September 2024 (aged 109); Thekkampatti, Coimbatore district, Tamil Nadu, India
- Other name: Rangammal
- Occupation: Farmer
- Known for: Organic farming
- Awards: Padma Shri

Pappammal (or Papammal; 1914 – 27 September 2024) was an Indian organic farmer from Tamil Nadu. At the age of 105, she was argued to be the oldest farmer still active in the field. She was regarded as an agricultural pioneer and worked with Tamil Nadu Agricultural University's department of education. She worked every day on her 2.5 acres (1 hectare) of land. Due to her contributions to organic farming, the government of India honoured her in 2021 with the Padma Shri, the fourth highest civilian award in India.

== Personal life ==
M. Pappammal alias Rangammal was born to Velammal and Maruthachala Mudaliar in the village of Devalapuram in 1914. She lost her parents at a young age, and she and her two sisters were raised in Thekkampatti, Coimbatore by their paternal grandmother. She inherited her grandmother's shop and opened an eatery. From the profits she made from these businesses, she bought nearly 10 acres (4 hectares) of land in the village. She also brought up her sister's children.

She started her day at 5:30 am and went to her farm at 6 am, where she worked until the afternoon. Her family members claimed that it was her food habits and active lifestyle that kept her healthy. She did not consume tea or coffee and drank hot water. When she was 105, she was said to be the oldest active farmer and worked every day on the 2.5 acres (1 hectare) of land that she owned at that time.

She worked with Tamil Nadu Agricultural University's department of education and organised discussion forums to apprise farmers about the university’s farming technologies and practices.

In 2021, Pappammal was awarded the Padma Shri, India's fourth highest civilian award, for her contributions to organic farming.

Pappammal died on 27 September 2024, at the age of 109.

== Political life ==
Pappammal was politically active in her younger years. In 1959, she was elected as a ward member of the Thekkampatti Panchayat. She was also elected as a councillor in Karamadai panchayat union. She was a member of the Dravida Munnetra Kazhagam and a fan of M. Karunanidhi. She participated in farmer-related events and protests.
