= S. M. Khan =

Indian civil servant (1957–2024)

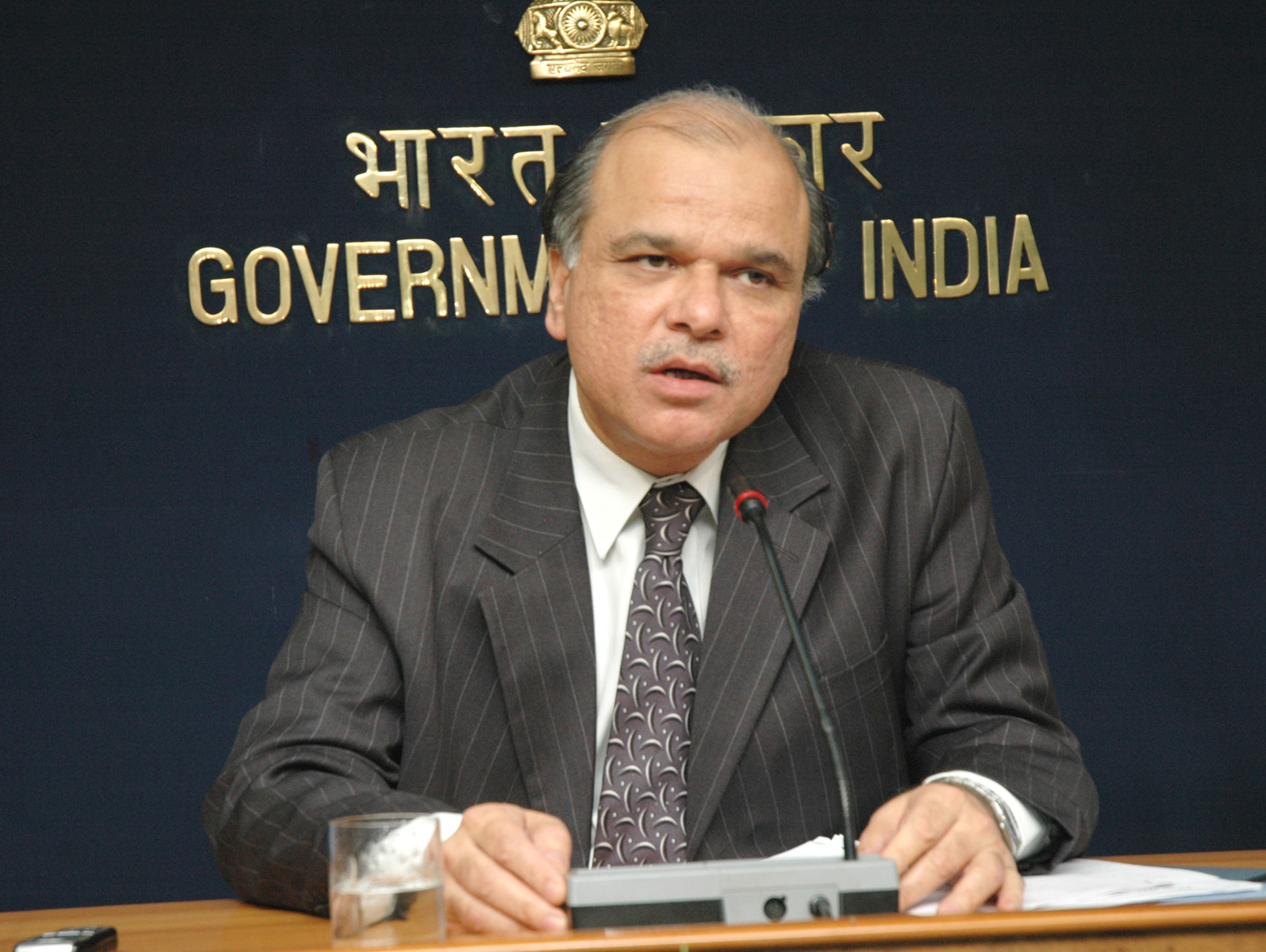
- Khan in 2008

Director General (Press Registrar and Head of Department), Registrar of Newspapers for India

Personal details
- Born: 15 June 1957 Khurja, Uttar Pradesh, India
- Died: 17 November 2024 (aged 67)
- Spouse: Shehnaz Khan
- Children: 3
- Education: Aligarh Muslim University, University of Wales

S. M. Khan (15 June 1957 – 17 November 2024) was an Indian Information Service officer of Government of India. Khan, a 1982-batch IIS officer, had a long tenure with Central Bureau of Investigation as its spokesperson and Press Secretary to then President of India A P J Abdul Kalam, and served as Director of Jamia Hamdard Residential Coaching Academy.

== Early life and education ==
Khan was born in the town of Khurja, Uttar Pradesh on 15 June 1957. He belonged to a family of lawyers. Khan studied law for his graduation and pursued LLM from Aligarh University. He was awarded the Chancellors Gold Medal for topping the entire University. He later went to University of Wales for a degree in economics.

== Important postings ==
During his nearly 13 years service in Central Bureau of Investigation, Khan was the face of the agency appearing regularly on national and international media, which at that time had been handling several high-profile cases, including the 1992 Indian stock market scam, the assassination of Rajiv Gandhi, and Bofors.

Khan served as Press Secretary to A. P. J. Abdul Kalam, President of India (2002 to 2007). He dealt with national and international media, acting as chief spokesman.

Khan also served government of India's Directorate of Film Festival (DFF) as director for two years and headed the India International Film Festival. As director of the DFF, Khan was responsible for the National Film Awards and Dada Saheb Phalke Awards. He also represented India at the Cannes and Berlin Film Festivals.

Khan also served at the Press Information Bureau as a director general, and later as the Press Registrar of India. Along with Minister of Information & Broadcasting Shri Prakash Javadekar, Khan released Press in India in c. 2011.

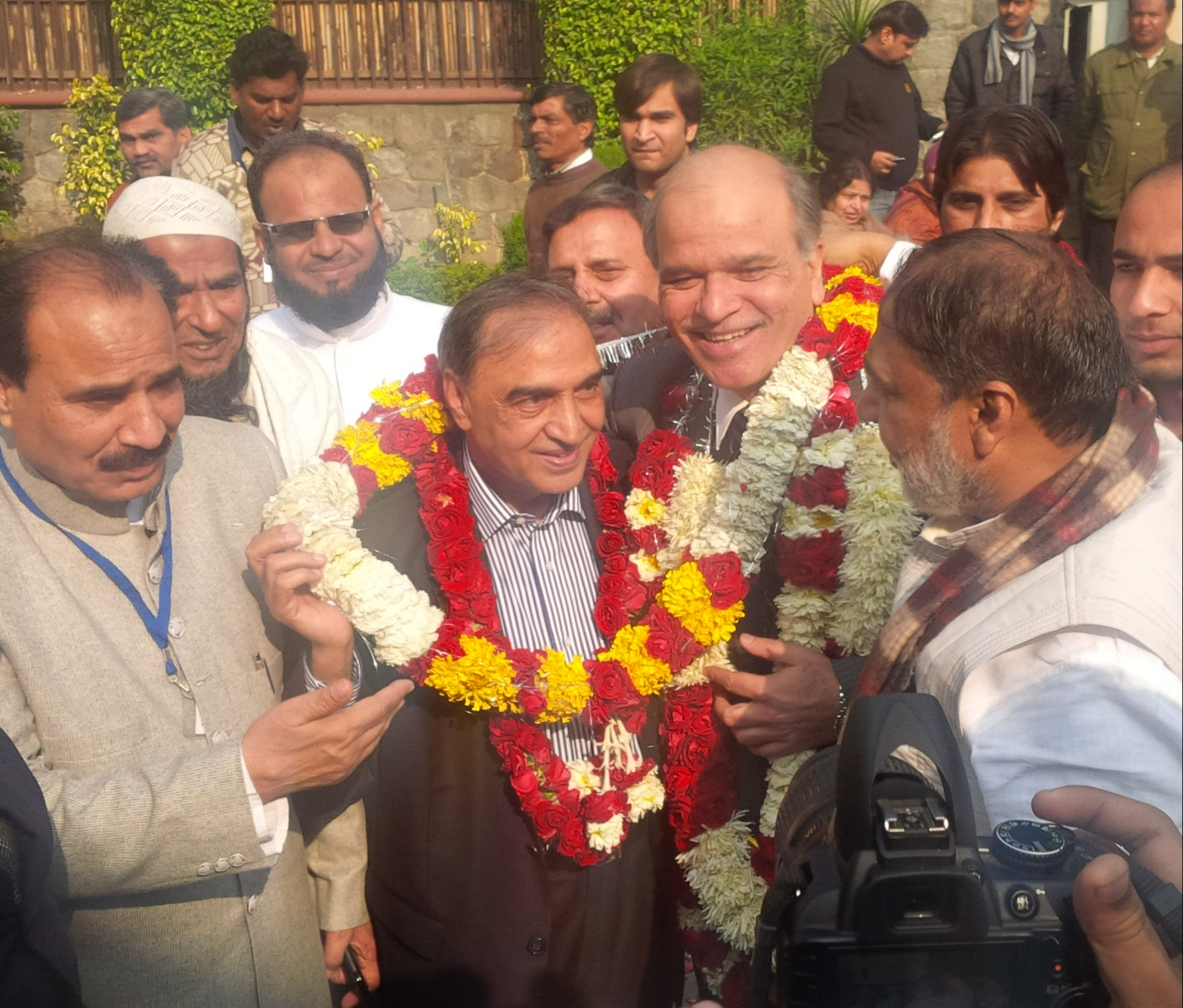
S. M. Khan with his supporters after winning the IICC Elections 2014

On 12 January 2014, Khan was elected trustee of the India Islamic Cultural Center, which was established to promote mutual understanding and amity amongst the people of the country. On 7 January 2019, Khan was elected as the organisation's vice president.

Khan was a member of the Aligarh Muslim University and was also appointed by the President of India as his nominee in the executive council.

Khan started the webcasting of news bulletins of Doordarshan News from the regional news centers.

== Author ==
Khan wrote his debut book on the People's President Dr. APJ Abdul Kalam, in which he shares his experiences with Kalam during and post presidency. The book has been published by Bloomsbury Publishing and was released in January 2017 by the Vice President of India Shri Hamid Ansari and Finance Minister of India Shri Arun Jaitley. The first copy of the book was presented to the Prime Minister of India Shri Narendra Modi.

== Death ==
Khan died after a brief illness on 17 November 2024, at the age of 67.

== Sources ==
- "Plan to curb frivolous newspaper registrations". The Hindu. 6 November 2014. Archived from the original on 24 February 2025.
