= Shirish B. Patel =

Indian civil engineer (1932–2024)

- Born: 7 March 1932
- Died: 20 December 2024 (aged 92)
- Occupation: Civil engineer
- Known for: Kemp's Corner Flyover

Shirish B. Patel (1932 – 20 December 2024) was an Indian civil engineer and the founder of Shirish Patel & Associates (SPA), a company which designs, manages and inspects structural engineering projects. Patel was a writer and speaker in the media on the topic of urban planning and urban density.

Patel also helped to form the Indian Institute for Human Settlements. He was also a founding member of the Housing Development Finance Corporation.

== Biography ==
Patel was born on 7 March 1932. He obtained a degree in engineering from the University of Cambridge before returning to India. He started his career working on infrastructure projects, including the Kariba Dam on the Zambezi river, a work he did for a French engineering firm, and the Koyna Dam in Maharashtra.

Patel founded his engineering firm in 1960.

=== Work on Navi Mumbai ===
Patel and two other authors, Charles Correa and Praveena Mehta, created a plan in 1965 to create a new city across the harbour from Bombay. When the government accepted the project, Patel was appointed the Technical Director of the City and Industrial Development Corporation of Maharashtra, and the state government outfit was charged with implementing the project. Patel coordinated the plan's implementation in its initial years between 1970 and 1974 as head of the planning team.

=== Other Projects ===
Patel was the main designer of the Kemp’s Corner Flyover, the first in India, using new construction technology which had not been tried in India before.

As well as planning and designing, Patel and his company were often called upon to perform infrastructure inspections, data collection and analysis, and other consulting work.

== Research ==
Patel also wrote several research papers on various housing and urban planning topics. Some of his papers are:

- Patel, Shirish B. (1996). "Slum Rehabilitation in Mumbai: Possible if done differently". Economic and Political Weekly. 31 (18): 1047–1050. ISSN 0012-9976.
- Patel, S. B. (2005). Housing policies for Mumbai. Economic and Political Weekly, 3669-3676.
- Phatak, V. K., & Patel, S. B. (2005). Would decentralisation have made a difference? Economic and Political Weekly, 3902-3905.
- Patel, S. B. (2011). Analyzing urban layouts–can high density be achieved with good living conditions? Environment and Urbanization, 23(2), 583-595.
- Tandel, V., Patel, S., Gandhi, S., Pethe, A., & Agarwal, K. (2016). Decline of rental housing in India: the case of Mumbai. Environment and Urbanization, 28(1), 259-274.

He also innovated on an efficient cooker with researchers, including Jyeshtharaj Joshi at the Institute of Chemical Technology.

== Death ==
Patel died on 20 December 2024, at the age of 92.
