= 2024 Mumbai boat accident =

Mid-sea accident off the coast of Mumbai

Coordinates: 18°55′33″N 72°51′53″E

The 2024 Mumbai boat accident was a mid-sea collision on 18 December 2024, that killed 15 people when an Indian naval boat collided with a passenger ferry which then capsized off the coast of Mumbai, India.

== Collision ==
On 18 December 2024, around 04:00 pm (local time), Neel Kamal, a privately owned passenger ferry, was headed towards the Elephanta Caves, a UNESCO World Heritage Site on Elephanta Island, from the Gateway of India in Mumbai, India. An Indian Navy craft with six persons on board was undergoing engine trials when it lost control and collided with the passenger ferry. At least 13 people were killed, including three navy personnel, while two more were missing.

The ferry was permitted to carry up to 90 people, including six crew members and 84 passengers. However, at the time of the collision, the ferry was overcrowded, carrying over 110 passengers.

On 19 December 2024, the body of a 43-year-old man was found close to the ferry taking the death toll to 14.

On 21 December 2024, the body of a missing 7-year-old child was found within Mumbai harbour, increasing the death toll to 15.

== Responses ==
By the evening, 101 people were rescued by the Indian Navy, Indian Coast Guard and police, with eleven naval craft and four helicopters taking part in the search and rescue mission, according to the Chief Minister of Maharashtra Devendra Fadnavis.

On 19 December 2024, the Indian Navy formed a 'Board of Inquiry' into the collision to establish the facts of the case.

The Mumbai Police also registered a first information report against the Navy craft driver at Colaba police station.

Indian Prime Minister Narendra Modi announced an ex-gratia payment of INR 200,000 (USD 2,356.63) from the Prime Minister's National Relief Fund for the next of kin of each killed in the boat collision and INR 50,000 for the injured.

Following the collision, the Maharashtra Maritime Board introduced new regulation that requires all ferry passengers in Maharashtra to wear life jackets during their trip.
