= Shantilata Barik =

Indian Odia-language singer (1958–2024)

- ଶାନ୍ତିଲତା ବାରିକ
- Born: 1958; Bishnupur, Namapada, Puri, Odisha
- Died: 1 April 2024 (aged 65–66); Bhubaneswar
- Known for: Odia singer
- Awards: Odisha Sangeet Natak Academy Award

Shantilata Barik (1958 – 1 April 2024) was an Indian singer who mainly worked in the Odia film and music industry, who was popular for devotional songs. She was a certified singer of Akashvani Cuttack.

== Early life ==
Barik was born in 1958 in Bishnupur village under Puri district, Odisha, India to Basudev Barik and Kamala Devi. She was married to Basant Chhotray, a resident of Kusubenti village under Brahmagiri administration. The couple has two sons.

== Career ==
She started her career in music after professional training from music teachers like Balakrushna Das, Markandeya Mohapatra, Sinhari Shyamasundar Kar and a degree (Acharya) from Utkala Sangeet Mahavidyalya. In 1978, she came to limelight with the popular Odia devotional song, He Chakanayana, a song on lord Jagannath. Songs like Thaka mana chala jiba..., Bhaji bhaji to nama..., Jagannatha tume bada chhalia became popular and she became a household name in Odisha.

== Movies ==
- 1982: Basanti Apa - playback singer

== Award ==
- Odisha Sangeet Natak Academy awards

== Death ==
Barik died from cancer at a private hospital in Bhubaneswar on April 1, 2024. She has been suffering from cancer since 2011, and after COVID-19, her health condition was unstable.
