= Mumbai billboard collapse =

2024 accident in Mumbai, India

- Date: 13 May 2024
- Location: Ghatkopar, Mumbai
- Cause: Collapse of an illegal billboard due to rains
- Deaths: 17
- Injuries: 75

On 13 May 2024, a billboard in the Ghatkopar suburb of Mumbai, collapsed following heavy rains. 17 people were killed and more than 75 were injured.

== Background ==
Billboards in urban areas and political hoardings are commonly erected across India. There have been various incidents in the last few years wherein more than ten people have been killed in various accidents involving illegal erections in Chennai, Coimbatore, Delhi and Pune. Despite the ruling of courts in India, the practice still existed in 2024.

== Incident ==
On 13 May 2024, a large billboard measuring 120x120 ft in the Ghatkopar suburb of Mumbai, collapsed following heavy rains. 17 people were killed and more than 75 were injured. The billboard crashed onto a petrol station, crushing vehicles and people who had taken shelter from the rains. The billboard was constructed illegally, against the maximum permitted size of 40×40 ft. The rescue operations continued for more than 66 hours and ended on 10:30 am on 16 May.

== Aftermath ==
Following the incident, the Brihanmumbai Municipal Corporation issued orders for the immediate removal of similar hoardings nearby. On May 16, the owner of the hoarding was arrested for culpable homicide not amounting to murder and various other charges. The Chief Minister of Maharashtra Eknath Shinde announced an ex-gratia of ₹500,000 (US$5,200) to the next of kin of each person killed in the incident.
