= Ram Buxani =

Indian businessman (1941–2024)

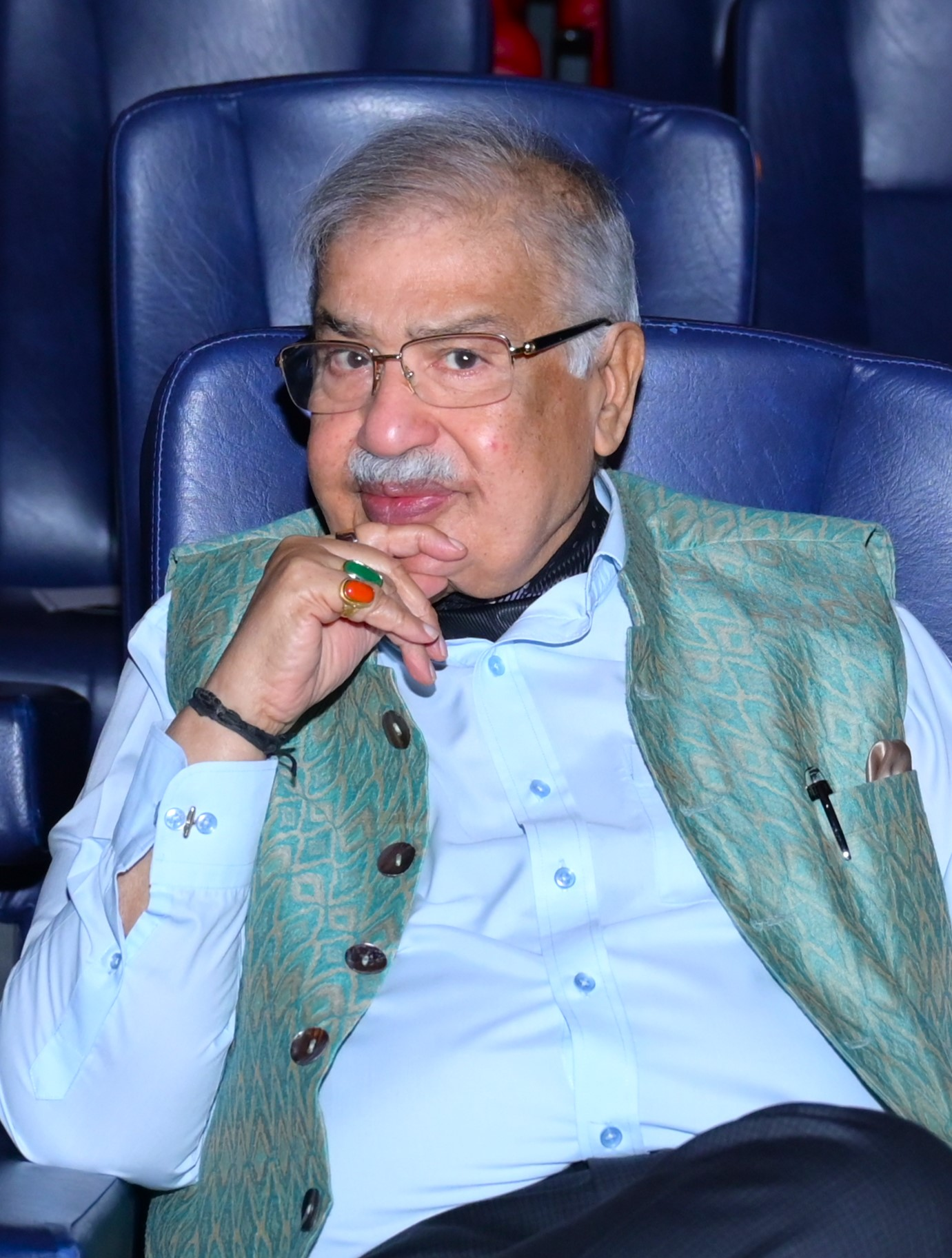
- Ram Buxani in Dubai, 2023.
- Born: 1941; Hyderabad, Sind Province, British India
- Died: 8 July 2024 (aged 83); Dubai, United Arab Emirates
- Education: Washington International University
- Occupation: Businessman
- Website: rambuxani.com

Ram Buxani (1941 – 8 July 2024) was an Indian businessman and chairman of the business conglomerate ITL Cosmos Group. He became a well-known figure in the Indian community after his role in influencing the Indian government to abolish estate duty in 1985.

== Personal life ==
Buxani was born in 1941 in Hyderabad, Sindh in British India. Like many other Sindhi Hindu families, his family migrated to India after the Partition of India in 1947. His father died when he was five years old.

At the age of 18, in order to support his widowed mother and family, he started to search for a job in Mumbai. After seeing an advertisement in a local newspaper, he applied for a job as an executive assistant with International Traders Limited in Dubai. Buxani started working in 1959 as an office clerk at the ITL outpost at Dubai and eventually rose to chair the Cosmos ITL group in 2014.

Buxani was also a writer and actor, having acted in 28 plays. He had three daughters and seven grandchildren.

His 2003 autobiography, Taking the High Road, was a bestseller in Dubai for several months. It was subsequently translated to Arabic, Hindi, Malayalam, and several Indian and Pakistani languages. Another book, titled Sindhis – God’s Gift to Global Economy, was published in 2007.

Buxani died in Dubai on 8 July 2024, at the age of 83.

== Career ==
Buxani was a director of IndusInd Bank from 2000 to 2008. From 2000 to 2004, he was the chairman of the board of The Indian High School, Dubai.

Buxani was the founder and chairman (during 1987–1993 and 1995–1999) of the Overseas Indians Economic Forum (UAE), which was a forum for the expatriate Indian community until 2003, when it merged with the Indian Business and Professional Council. He was also instrumental in supporting and arranging temporary shelter for the NRIs fleeing from Kuwait en route to India during the Invasion of Kuwait by Iraq in 1990.

Sripriyaa Kumaria, director general of the India Trade & Exhibition Centre in Sharjah, described him as "the founding father of the U.A.E.’s NRI community".

Forbes Middle East selected him as one of the top Indian leaders of the Middle East during 2014, 2016 and 2017, and awarded him its "Lifetime Achievement Award" in 2017.

== Education ==
In 2004, he obtained a Ph.D. degree in International Business from Washington International University, an online unaccredited institution. He earned an honorary D.Litt. Degree by D.Y. Patil University of Mumbai for his contribution to NRIs and victims of natural calamity.
