= 2024 Haldwani riots =

Riots in Uttarakhand, India

Uttarakhand Violence
- People throwing rocks back at the riots
- Date: 9–10 February 2024
- Location: Haldwani, Uttarakhand, India; 29.22°N 79.52°E
- Caused by: Government clearing of illegal encroachments

Casualties
- Deaths: 6
- Injuries: 250
- Arrested: 36
- Location of Haldwani in Uttarakhand

On 8 February 2024, violent clashes erupted in Haldwani, Uttarakhand, following the court-ordered demolition of an unauthorised madrasa situated in the Banbhoolpura area, predominantly inhabited by Muslims. Rioters allegedly hurled stones at law enforcement officers, set vehicles ablaze, and deployed petrol bombs during the events. Six people were killed.

== Background ==
Illegal migration of non-native Muslims into Uttarakhand has been an issue for over a decade. Over 900,000 illegal immigrants of Bangladeshi origin live in Uttarakhand.

According to the Uttarakhand state government, illegal migrants from Bangladesh, and Rohingyas from Saharanpur, Uttar Pradesh have been moving into Uttarakhand and Himachal Pradesh. The migrants often encroach on government land, illegally constructing mosques, minarets, and madrasas.

The pattern of illegal immigration has caused tension with the state before. In December 2022, the Supreme Court of India stopped the removal of over 4,000 illegal structures, housing over 5,000 unauthorised residents from railway land in Haldwani station after protests broke out in the state.

== Riots ==
The Haldwani Police received orders from the Uttarakhand High Court to remove an illegally constructed mosque and madrasa in the Malik ka Bagicha area under the jurisdiction of Banbhoolpura Police, which stood on government land. A petition was heard to stop the demolition of the illegal structures, however the court found no convincing evidence that the structure was not illegal, and thus no relief was granted.

As the police began to clear the illegal encroachment, angry residents descended to the streets to protest the removal of the illegal structures. They began breaking barricades and arguing with police personnel. As the clearing of the structure continued, the mob began pelting stones at the police, leaving over 60 injured, including police personnel. The police used non-lethal force, including tear gas and lathis to clear the crowd; however, tensions escalated, leading to the mob setting fire to several vehicles. Rioting continued until the evening, when the mob also set Banbhoolpura Police Station on fire. The Uttarakhand government on 11 February 2024 demanded four additional companies of Central Armed Police Forces from the Ministry of Home Affairs after it had already sent four of them earlier. The police confirmed that the violence was pre-planned, and that the rioters had attacked the police joint anti-encroachment team without any provocation.

A curfew was imposed in the city on 8 February 2024, with officers given permission to shoot on sight. The curfew was lifted from the outer areas of Haldwani town on 10 February 2024 with the police claiming the situation to be under control. However, the curfew remained in place in the Banbhoolpura area and some adjacent localities. Internet services also remained suspended in the entire town. Shops on the outskirts of Haldwani had opened while schools and colleges remained shut. On 11 February 2024, most of the shops in the Banbhoolpura area that had been shut since the incident reopened and internet services were also restored in most areas.

== Investigations ==
By 13 February, thirty-six individuals had been arrested, and three FIRs had been registered against a total of 19 named persons and 5,000 unidentified people. The arrests were made based on CCTV footage collected from the site of the violence. Numerous locally manufactured weapons and live ammunition were reported to have been seized from the arrested individuals by the police.

Additionally, in accordance with an order issued by the Nainital district administration to cancel 120 arms licenses of residents in the affected area, 41 licensed weapons were reported to have been confiscated.

== Aftermath ==
Following the violence, Chief Minister of Uttarakhand Pushkar Singh Dhami underscored in a tweet that every rioter would be apprehended, ensuring no one would be spared. Additionally, a decision was made to establish a police station at the site where the illegal encroachment had been demolished.

On 9 February 2024, seven individuals, including a journalist, were receiving treatment, with three of them reported to be in a serious condition. As a consequence of the turmoil, over 300 Muslim families opted to evacuate their homes in Banbhoolpura.

A recovery notice of Rs 2.44 crore was issued by the municipal corporation in Haldwani against Abdul Malik, a central figure in the Banbhoolpura violence. Government properties were reportedly damaged by Malik's supporters during a demolition drive in 'Malik Ka Bagicha.' The notice references the FIR filed on February 8, naming Malik. The civic body claimed an initial assessment of Rs 2.44 crore in damages caused by Malik and instructed him to deposit the amount by February 15. Failure to comply would result in legal actions for recovery, as Malik is accused of constructing the "illegal structure". The amount included Rs 2.41 crore for damage to 15 vehicles and Rs Rs 3.52 lakh for damage to equipment.

== See also ==
- 2023 Nuh Riots
