= Amol Kale =

Indian cricket administrator (1976-2024)

President Mumbai Cricket Association
- In office 21 October 2022 – 10 June 2024

Member Tirumala Tirupati Devasthanams
- In office 2021–2024

Personal details
- Born: 1976 Nagpur, Maharashtra, India
- Died: 10 June 2024 (aged 48) New York City, U.S.
- Spouse: Minal
- Children: One son, one daughter
- Parent: Kishor Kale (father)
- Education: Nagpur University (B.E.)
- Occupation: Cricket administrator

Amol Kale (1976 – 10 June 2024) was an Indian cricket administrator, president of the Mumbai Cricket Association, and former BJP ward president for Abhyankar Nagar, Nagpur. Amol Kale was appointed member of Tiruputi Balaji Devasthan Trust in Andhra Pradesh three consecutive times.

== Education and early career ==
Kale was born to Kishor Kale. His family was associated with Rashtriya Swayamsewak Sangh. Kale did his schooling from Saraswati Vidyalaya at Shankar Nagar Nagpur. Incidentally Devendra Fadnavis too studied at the same school. His grandfather Malhar Kale was MLC (Teachers Constituency), was founder of Nutan Bharat Vidyalay at Abhyankar Nagar Nagpur. He was married to Minal and had one son, one daughter.

== Death ==
Amol Kale died from a cardiac arrest in New York City, on 10 June 2024, at the age of 48, shortly after watching a cricket match between India and Pakistan.
