= 2024 Virudhunagar explosions =

2024 accident in Thane, India

- Date: 17 February 2024; 29 June 2024
- Location: Virudhunagar district, Tamil Nadu
- Cause: Fireworks explosion
- Deaths: 14
- Injuries: 8+

On 17 February 2024, a fire broke out following an explosion at a firecracker factory in Virudhunagar district, Tamil Nadu. Ten people were killed and more than seven were injured. On 29 June 2024, another explosion at a different fire cracker unit near Sattur, resulted in four deaths and one injury.

== Background ==
Virudhunagar district is a major centre for fire cracker with nearly 90% of the fire cracker production of the country manufactured here. The firecracker units are located in rural areas, employ cheap local labour and often do not follow safety norms. Several accidents have been reported due to mishandling of chemicals and poor safety norms.

== Incidents ==
At 12:30 IST 17 February 2024, an explosion at a fire cracker manufacturing unit at Ramuthevanpatti village in Virudhunagar district, Tamil Nadu. The factory was involved in the production of fire crackers and the inflammable chemicals, resulted in a fire and further explosions. The fire started in the chemical mixing room and spread to nearby areas, resulting in the explosion. Ten people were killed and more than seven were injured in the explosion. On 29 June 2024, a similar explosion at a fire cracker unit near Sattur resulted in a fire, that killed four people and injured one. The fire started when chemicals used in the manufacture ignited.

== Aftermath ==
National Disaster Response Force (NDRF), Tamil Nadu Disaster Response Force (TNDRF) and Tamil Nadu Fire and Rescue Services were involved in fire control, search and rescue operations. The injured were rescued and treated in nearby hospitals. Chief Minister of Tamil Nadu M. K. Stalin announced an ex-gratia of ₹300,000 (US$3,100) for the next of the kin who were killed.
