= Bhushi Dam =

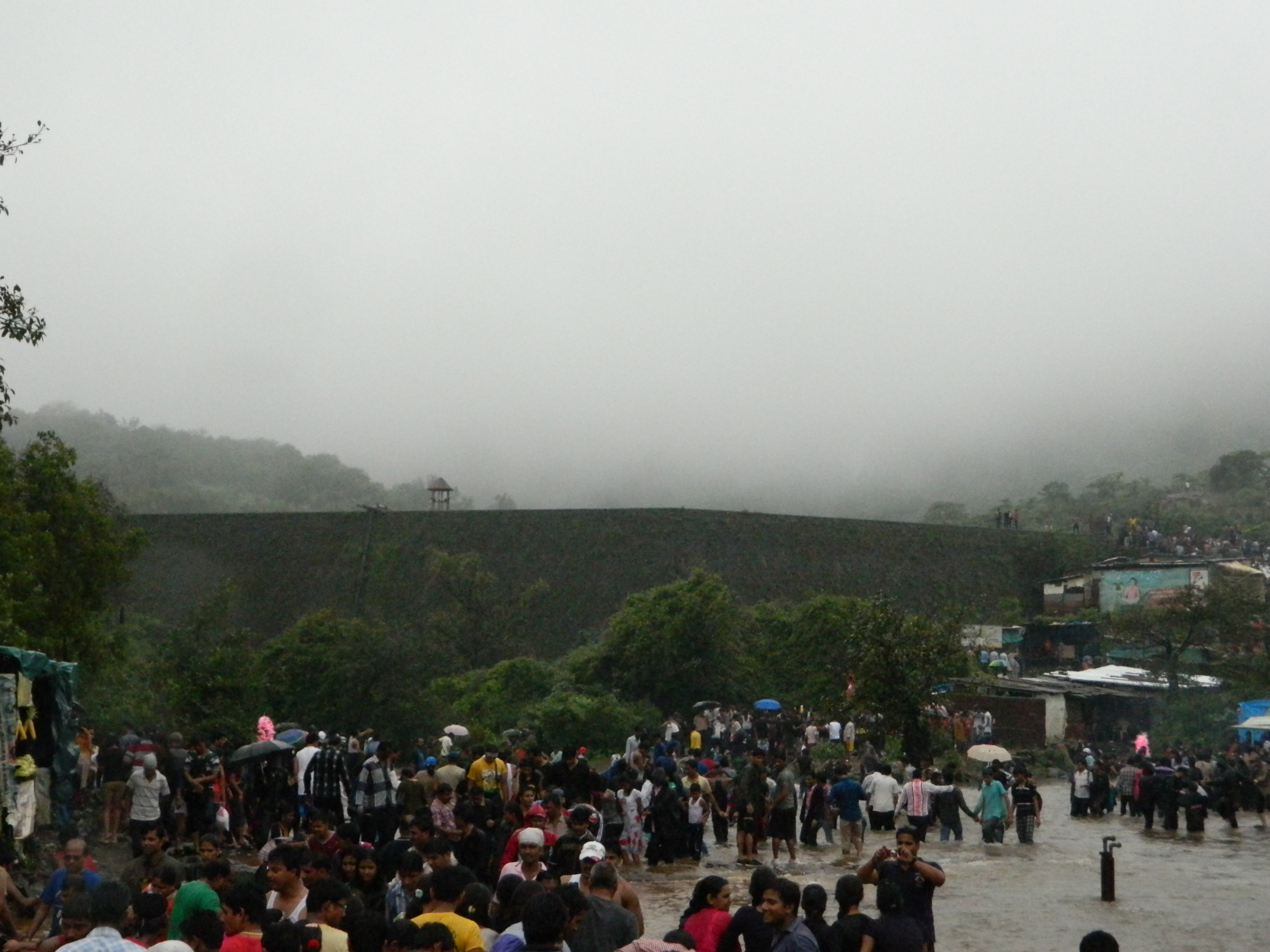
- Tourists gather around the dam.

- Location within Maharashtra
- Interactive map of Bhushi Dam
- Location: Lonavala, Maharashtra, India
- Coordinates: 18°43′21.86″N 73°23′47.26″E
- Opening date: 1860s
- Owner: Central Railway

Dam and spillways
- Impounds: Indrayani River

The Bhushi Dam is a masonry dam on the Indrayani River in Lonavala, Maharashtra, India. In 2014, the Indian Railways announced plans to develop Bhushi Dam as a tourist resort with participation from the private sector.

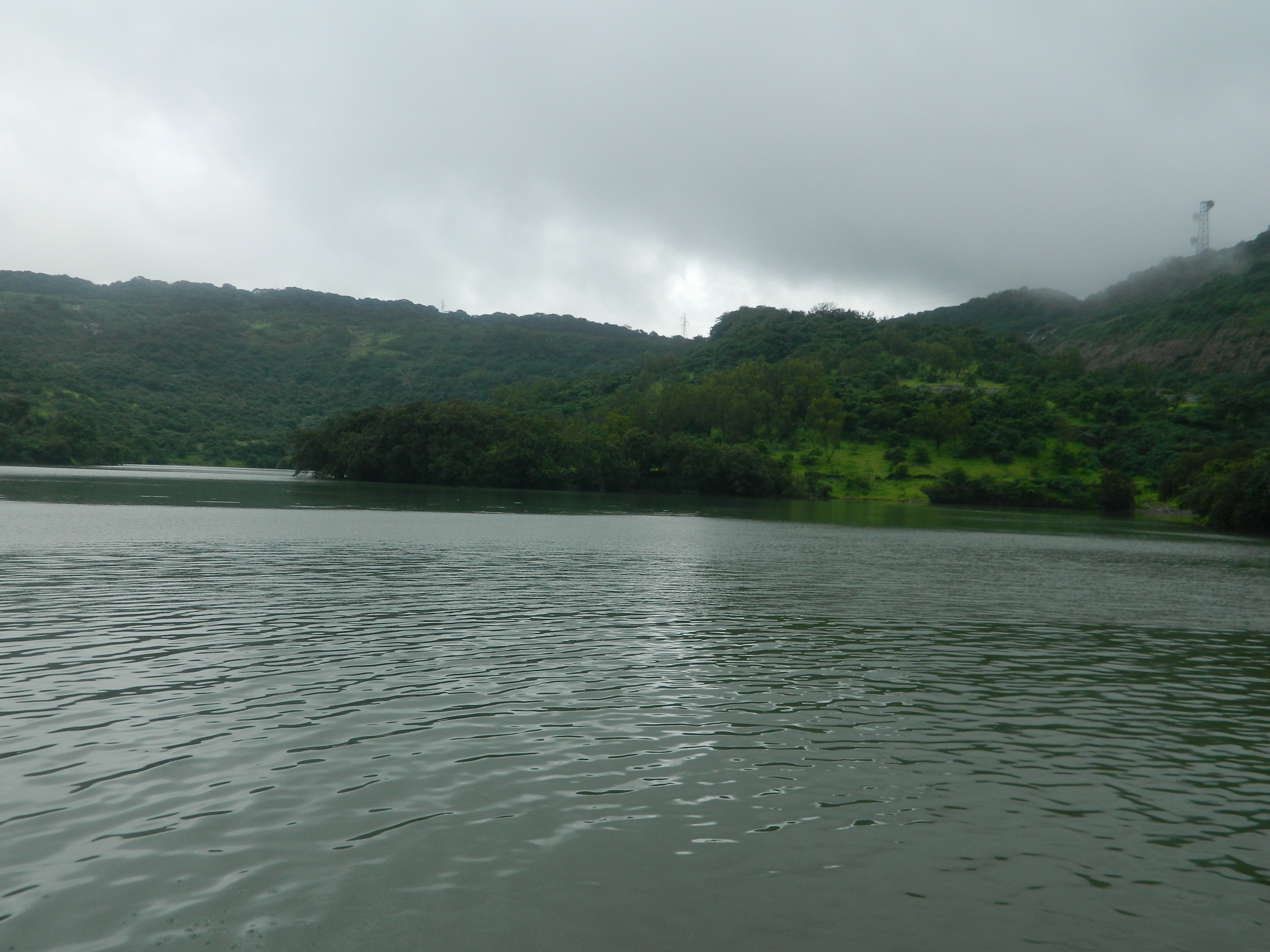
Bhushi reservoir

== History ==
The dam was built in the late 1860s for the Great Indian Peninsular Railway as a source of water for their steam engines. As of 2014 it is owned by the Central Railway zone of the Indian Railways, the successor to the Great Indian Peninsular Railway.

Water was carried from the reservoir to Lonavala, Khandala and the reversing station of the railways by cast-iron pipes. The Railway company later agreed to supply some water to the town of Lonavala as well, because the dam had been built using Municipal funding.

In 2011, the Indian Navy proposed to take over the Bhushi dam and Bhugaon lake for its training activities at the Indian Naval Station Shivaji which is located in the vicinity. The Lonavala Police stated that such a move would restrict the access of the public to the dam.

In 2012, the Maharashtra State Road Development Corporation (MSRDC) proposed to construct a 9 kilometres (5.6 miles) long tunnel along the Mumbai Pune Expressway which would pass right below the Bhushi dam.

== Accidents ==
The Bhushi Dam frequently sees cases of drowning. A 2012 report stated that as many as 25 people had died in a five-year period.

In order to bring down these accidents, the Lonavala Police and the railways set up a control room near the dam, as well as imposed a ban on consumption of liquor in areas surrounding the dam. Subsequently, vehicles were banned from entering the area after 3 pm and visitors were prohibited from entering the dam and the surrounding areas after 5 pm.

Tourists are usually allowed to visit the dam from 9 am up to 3 pm. Except local buses, all other buses are banned from entering the area.
