= Maguni Charan Kuanr =

Indian puppeteer (1937–2024)

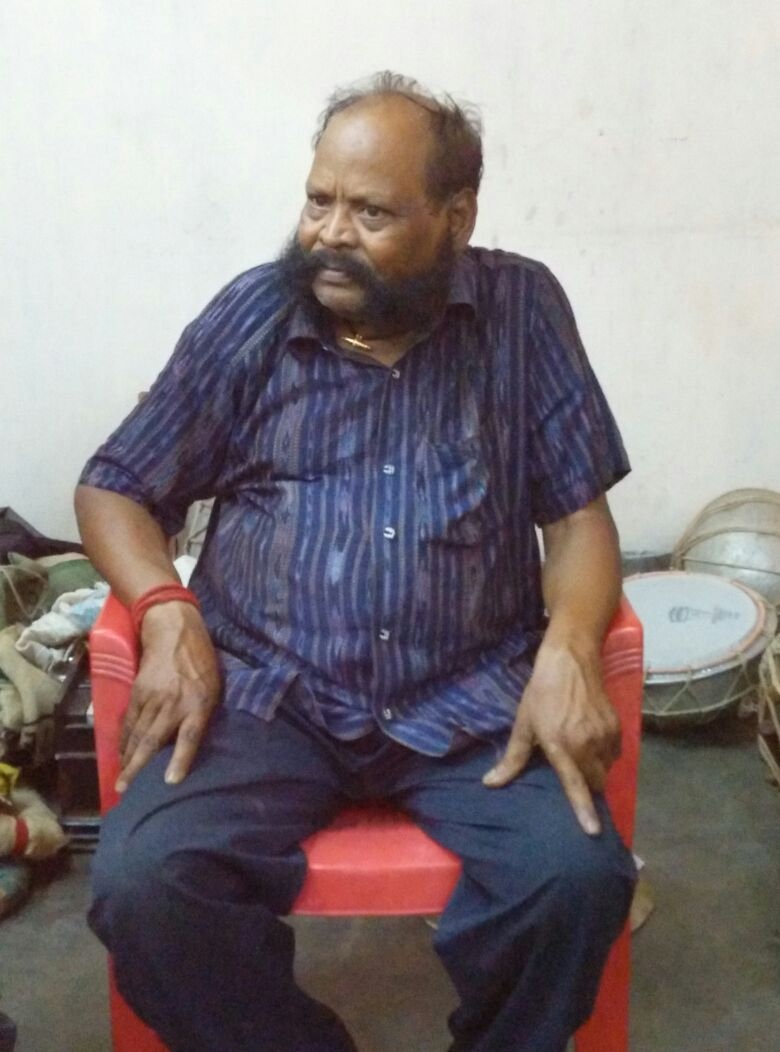
- Kuanr in 2015
- Born: 12 February 1937; Keonjhar, Orissa Province, British India
- Died: 1 June 2024 (aged 87); Keonjhar, Odisha, India
- Occupation: Puppeteer
- Known for: Promoting rod puppetry (Kandhei Nach)
- Awards: Padma Shri (2023); Sangeet Natak Akademi Award (2004)

Maguni Charan Kuanr (12 February 1937 – 1 June 2024) was an Indian puppeteer known for promoting rod puppetry, traditionally known as Kandhei Nach in the state of Odisha.

In 2023, Kuanr was conferred the Padma Shri, the fourth-highest civilian honour by the Government of India for promoting and propagating the traditional rod-puppet dance form of Odisha. Earlier in 2004, he had been conferred with the Sangeet Natak Akademi Award.

== Early life ==
Born on 2 February 1937 in Keonjhar, Odisha, Shri Maguni Charan Kuanr came from a family of traditional puppeteers. He was introduced to the art of Kandhei Nach, which uses rod puppets, by his father, Shri Baishnab Charan Kuanr.

== Work ==
Kuanr contributed significantly to recognising Kandhei Nach beyond Odisha. He established his troupe, the "Utkal Vishwakarma Kalakunja Kandhei Nach", based in Keonjhar. Shri Kuanr participated in camps and workshops organized by the Odisha Sangeet Natak Akademi and other institutions to promote his art. His work has been documented by various agencies in India and abroad.

Like many traditional puppeteers, he created his puppets, designed the costumes, and narrated the plays performed. Kuanr's characters and stories ranged from mythology to government schemes to social issues.

== Death ==
Kuanr died in Keonjhar, Odisha, on 1 June 2024, at the age of 87.

== Awards and honours ==
- Padma Shri
- Sangeet Natak Akademi Award
- Kabi Surya Upendra Bhanja Award, the highest award of Odisha Sangeet Natak Akademi
