= 2024 Thane explosion =

2024 accident in Thane, India

- Date: 23 May 2024
- Location: Dombivili, Thane, Maharashtra
- Cause: Fire due to explosion
- Deaths: 10
- Injuries: 64

On 23 May 2024, a fire broke out following the explosion of four boilers at a chemical factory in Dombivili, a suburb of Thane. Ten people were killed and more than 64 were injured.

== Incident ==
At 13:30 IST on 23 May 2024, four boilers exploded at the Amber Chemical Factory at Dombivili, a suburb of Thane. The factory was involved in the production of food coloring and other chemicals. The fire spread to nearby factories and buildings, before being extinguished. Ten people were killed and more than 64 were injured in the accident.

== Aftermath ==
National Disaster Response Force (NDRF), Thane Disaster Response FOrce (TDRF) and Maharashtra fire service were involved in fire control, search and rescue operations. The injured were rescued and treated in nearby hospitals. The owner of the factory was arrested after the accident and experts opined that fire safety regulations might not have been followed. The cause of the accident is under investigation.

Government of Maharashtra announced that the fire started in a reactor and spread to other parts of the plant, resulting in the explosion. An expert committee was formed to investigate the accident. Chief Minister of Maharashtra Eknath Shinde announced an ex-gratia of ₹500,000 (US$5,200) for the next of the kin who were killed.
