= 2024 India floods =

Monsoon floods in Assam

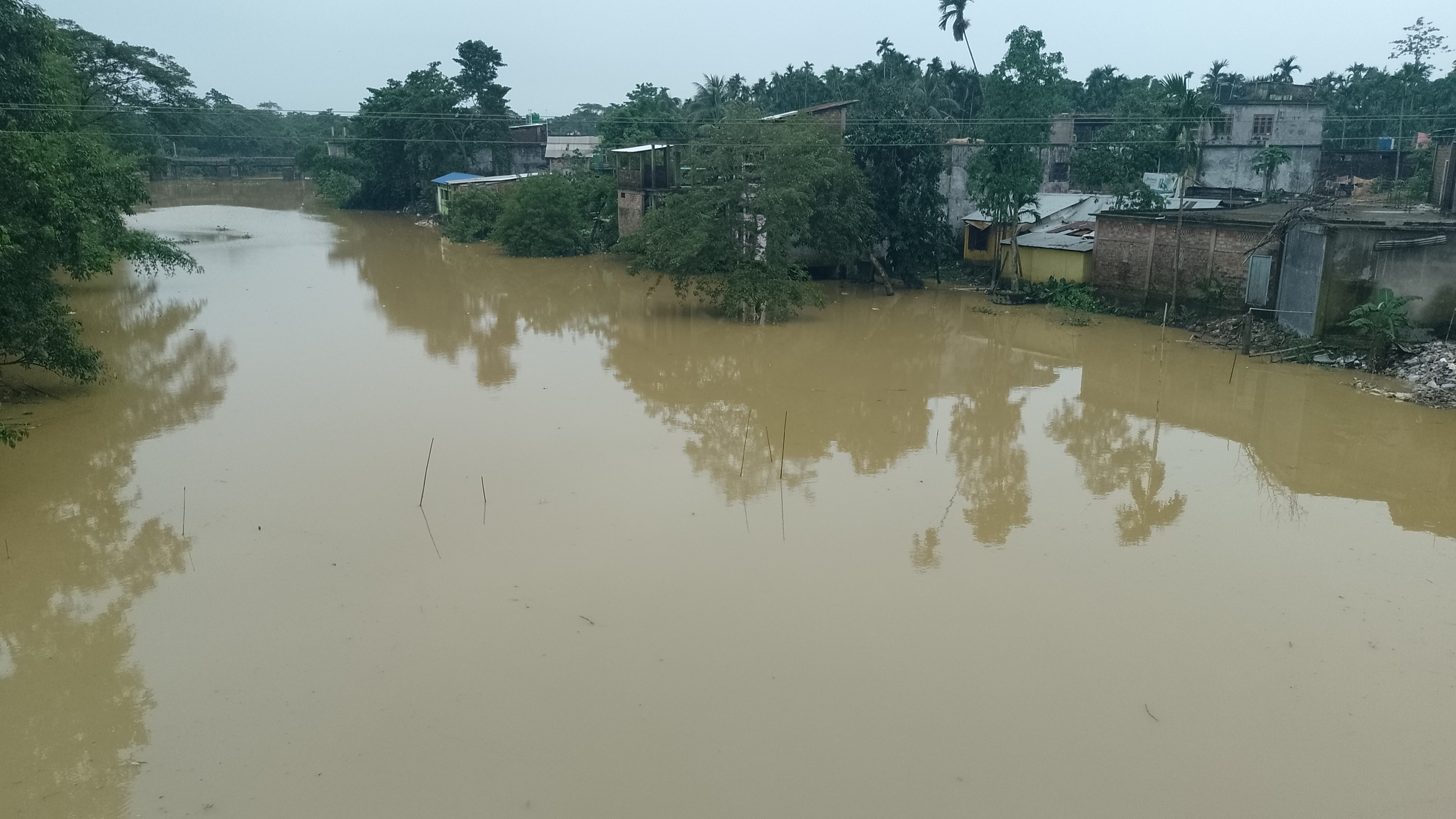
- Flooded area along the river bank of the Kachua river at Chargula, Karimganj, Assam.
- Date: 26 May – 30 September 2024
- Location: Assam, Arunachal Pradesh, Sikkim, Manipur, Tripura, Uttar Pradesh, Himachal Pradesh, Kerala, Meghalaya and Gujarat
- Cause: Monsoon rainfall
- Outcome: 65,000 people evacuated
- Deaths: 1,878+ (Note: Including 420 deaths, 397 injuries and 118 missing from the 2024 Wayanad landslides.)
- Injuries: 412+
- Missing: 151+
- Displaced: 351,000+
- 7.7 million people impacted

Heavy rainfall during the 2024 monsoon season resulted in severe flooding and landslides across several states of India, which caused devastating losses across India. Rainfall caused significant flooding first in Assam State and later in Gujarat as well.

== Events ==
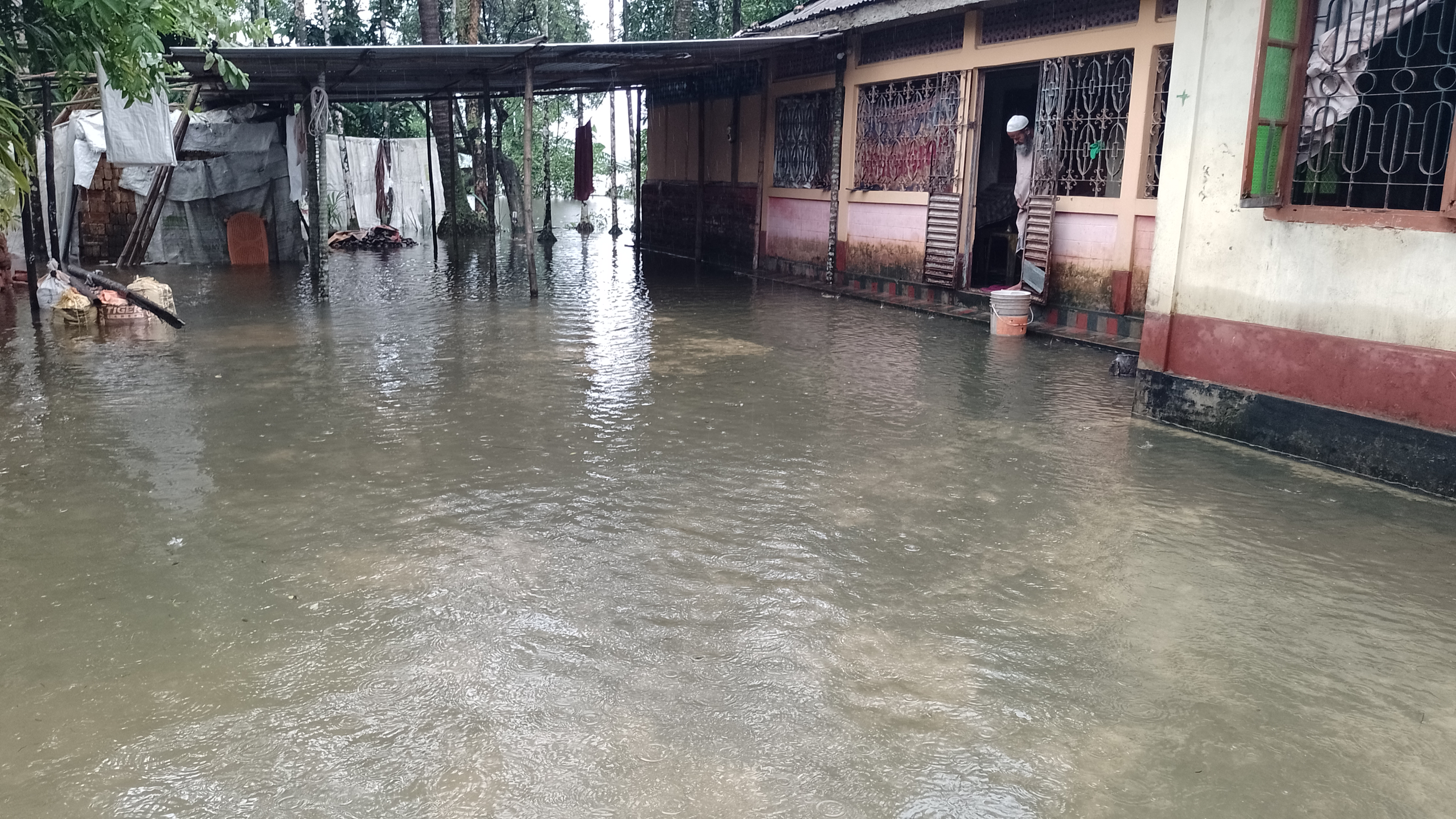
Flood affected house in Karimganj District, Assam, India

Heavy rainfall and flooding in June 2024 severely impacted Assam State in India, causing 109 deaths and inundating at least 1,325 villages in 19 districts, exacerbated by several rivers such as the Kopili, Barak, and Kushiyara overflowing. At least 400,000 people were impacted and 14,000 displaced, with the Karimganj, Darrang and Tamulpur districts being the worst hit. Flooding also killed five people and injured 13 others in Manipur, where 100,000 people were affected. Severe flooding also occurred in Sikkim and Meghalaya, with intense river flow destroying roads and bridges.

For days, the swollen waters of the Brahmaputra River had flooded Kaziranga National Park and Tiger Reserve, resulting in the tragic death of over 200 wild animals, including ten endangered rhinos, who drowned in the deluge. Over 300,000 people were displaced due to their homes being submerged under heavy rain. Over 13 rivers were flowing above their "danger level," including the Brahmaputra River, putting over 2,000 island villages at risk of flooding. Overflowing by the river stranded thirteen fishermen for four days on an island in the Dibrugarh district that needed rescue. In Arunachal Pradesh, several roads were destroyed by landslides, stranding many villages and requiring army troops to rescue 70 students and teachers from a flooded school located in Changlang district. In addition, the Assam Rifles rescued 500 stranded civilians from other flooded areas.

Flooding from 11 to 12 July killed 54 people and affected 1.8 million people in 923 villages in Uttar Pradesh. In Himachal Pradesh, flooding and landslides killed 31 people and left 33 missing from 27 June to 16 August.

Heavy rains also battered Kerala, causing multiple landslides in Wayanad District which killed 420 people, injured 397, and left 118 missing.

Since 19 August, floods in Tripura have killed 31 people, injured two, destroyed or severely damaged 3,243 houses and partially damaged 17,046 others.

As of 4 September 2024, Gujarat had received 118% of the season's monsoon rainfall, causing flooding, destruction of infrastructure and crops, with at least 20,000 people relocating away.

On 26 September, over 46 people, including 37 children, drowned during Hindu festival rituals in flooded bodies of water and rivers.
