= Deaths in July 2024 =

The following is a list of notable deaths in July 2024.

Entries for each day are listed alphabetically by surname. A typical entry lists information in the following sequence:

- Name, age, country of citizenship at birth, subsequent country of citizenship (if applicable), reason for notability, cause of death (if known), and reference.

== July 2024 ==
=== 1 ===
- Funso Aiyejina, 75, Nigerian poet and academic.
- Michael Arnone, 91, American politician, member of the New Jersey General Assembly (1989–2004).
- Giorgio Biguzzi, 88, Italian Roman Catholic prelate, bishop of Makeni (1986–2012).
- Brad Carter, 87, American politician and engineer, member of the Mississippi State Senate (1996–2000).
- Michael Corcoran, 68, American journalist and author.
- Fausto Bordalo Dias, 75, Portuguese composer and singer.
- Jacques Freitag, 42, South African Olympic high jumper (2004), shot. (body discovered on this date)
- Glen Gondo, 75, American businessman and restauranteur, founder of the Japan Festival.
- Nilüfer Gürsoy, 103, Turkish politician, MP (1965–1969, 1973–1980).
- Jeffrey Hopkins, 83, American Tibetologist.
- Renate Hoy, 93, German actress (Schloß Hubertus, Abbott and Costello Go to Mars) and beauty pageant winner, Miss Germany (1952).
- Taras Hunczak, 92, Ukrainian-American historian and political scientist.
- Ismail Kadare, 88, Albanian novelist (The General of the Dead Army, Chronicle in Stone, The File on H.), heart attack.
- Clyde Laidlaw, 90, Australian footballer (Melbourne).
- June Leaf, 94, American visual artist, gastric cancer.
- Laurie Lindeen, 62, American musician and author, brain aneurysm.
- Hermine Liska, 94, Austrian Jehovah's Witness.
- Beth Long, 76, American politician, member of the Missouri House of Representatives (1990–2003).
- Vasil Ravyaka, 75, Belarusian politician, deputy (2008–2012).
- Jack Rowell, 87, English rugby union coach (Bath, national team) and executive.
- William Rubinstein, 77, American-British historian and author.
- Michael Sinelnikoff, 95, British-born Canadian actor (Criminal Law, The Lost World, 300), director and producer.
- Thor Spydevold, 79, Norwegian footballer (Fredrikstad, Sarpsborg, national team).
- Martin Stolar, 81, American civil rights and criminal defense attorney.
- Julien Terzics, 55, French musician and anarchist.
- Robert Towne, 89, American screenwriter (Chinatown, Shampoo, The Last Detail) and director, Oscar winner (1975).
- Colwyn Trevarthen, 93, New Zealand-British academic.
- Nino Vella, 31, French musician.
- Cliff Waldron, 83, American bluegrass singer.
- Jan-Erik Wikström, 91, Swedish politician, minister for education (1976–1982), MP (1971–1974, 1976–1992).

=== 2 ===
- Eugene Anderson, 80, American politician, member of the Kansas House of Representatives (1973–1976) and Senate (1985–1991).
- Bushwacker, 18, American bucking bull.
- Sune Carlsson, 92, Swedish Olympic sailor (1960).
- Chung-ying Cheng, 88, Chinese-American philosopher.
- Rick Cluff, 74, Canadian journalist (CBC Radio), cancer.
- Jean Daubigny, 76, French civil servant, prefect of Paris (2012–2015).
- Tom Fowler, 73, American bass guitarist and musician (The Mothers of Invention, It's a Beautiful Day, Air Pocket).
- Margit Gennser, 92, Swedish politician, MP (1982–2002).
- Brian Gilmore, 95, Australian footballer (Essendon, St Kilda).
- Germán Gutiérrez de Piñeres, 67, Colombian footballer (Millonarios), respiratory failure.
- André Hediger, 83, Swiss politician, five-time mayor of Geneva, member of the Grand Council of Geneva (2001–2005).
- Ivan Hričovský, 92, Slovak pomologist and celebrity gardener, pneumonia.
- Karl Jaffary, 88, American-born Canadian politician, Toronto city councillor (1969–1974).
- Beata Kamuda, 64, Polish Olympic rower (1980).
- Ella Mitchell, 88, American singer and actress (Big Momma's House).
- Ramon Montaño, 87, Filipino police officer, chief of the Philippine Constabulary (1988–1990).
- Comunardo Niccolai, 77, Italian footballer (Torres, Cagliari, national team), heart attack.
- Barry Reed, 86, English cricketer (Hampshire, MCC).
- Karel Rottiers, 71, Belgian cyclist (Molteni, Fiat France, IJsboerke).
- Aidos Sadyqov, 55, Kazakh journalist and opposition figure, complications from gunshot wounds.
- Saturnin Soglo, Beninese diplomat, minister of foreign affairs (1992–1993).
- Ermanno Vichi, 82, Italian politician, deputy (2006–2008).
- Rostislav Vondruška, 63, Czech businessman and politician, minister of regional development (2009–2010).
- Stuart Weir, 85, British journalist and writer, editor of New Statesman (1987–1991).
- Jeff Whitefoot, 90, English footballer (Nottingham Forest, Manchester United, Grimsby Town).

=== 3 ===
- Max Atkinson, 80, British academic and author, bronchial pneumonia.
- Smriti Biswas, 100, Indian actress (Baap Re Baap, Maryada, Chandni Chowk).
- Antonio Carattino, 101, Italian Olympic sailor (1952, 1956, 1968).
- Bob Davenport, 91, American football player (Winnipeg Blue Bombers, UCLA Bruins) and coach (Taylor Trojans).
- Roland Dumas, 101, French lawyer and politician, president of the Constitutional Council (1995–2000) and minister of foreign affairs (1984–1986, 1988–1993).
- Mark Germino, 73, American singer-songwriter.
- David Hofmans, 81, American Thoroughbred racehorse trainer (Alphabet Soup).
- H. Thomas Johnson, 86, American accounting historian.
- Hor Nambora, 66, Cambodian diplomat.
- Andriy Kutsenko, 35, Ukrainian track cyclist, killed in action.
- McKim Marriott, 100, American anthropologist.
- Nebiy Mekonnen, Ethiopian poet and journalist, co-founder of Addis Admass.
- José de Jesús Núñez Viloria, 86, Venezuelan Roman Catholic prelate, auxiliary bishop of Ciudad Bolívar (1982–1987) and bishop of Ciudad Guayana (1987–1990).
- Dudley Roberts, 78, English footballer (Coventry City, Mansfield Town, Scunthorpe United).
- Geoff Robinson, 66, Australian rugby league player (Canterbury-Bankstown, Halifax), heart attack.
- Valerian Shuvaev, 69, Russian diplomat, ambassador to Algeria (since 2022) and Iraq (2008–2012).
- Nugzari Tsurtsumia, 27, Georgian Greco-Roman wrestler, world champion (2019), suicide.
- Hidayat Ullah, Pakistani politician, senator (2012–2024), bombing.
- Margo Walters, 82, American Olympic alpine skier (1964).
- Mary Wings, 75, American cartoonist, writer, and artist, lung cancer.

=== 4 ===
- Bibbles Bawel, 93, American football player (Philadelphia Eagles, Hamilton Tiger-Cats).
- Wade Bell, 79, American Olympic runner (1968).
- Lee Bouggess, 76, American football player (Philadelphia Eagles, New York Stars).
- Alan Cherry, 78, American Mormon missionary.
- Ysanne Churchman, 99, English actress (The Archers).
- Raúl Dos Santos, 57, Uruguayan footballer (Albacete, Villareal, national team), pancreatic cancer.
- Tommy Dunker, 55, German speedway rider.
- Sylvia Fausett, 91, New Zealand community worker.
- Mack T. Hines, 77, American politician, member of the South Carolina House of Representatives (1995–2005).
- Cas Janssens, 79, Dutch footballer (N.E.C., Wageningen, OC de Charleroi).
- Marilyn Krysl, 82, American writer (Dinner with Osama).
- Dorothy Lichtenstein, 84, American philanthropist.
- David Liederman, 75, American chef and businessman, heart attack.
- Stephen W. Littlejohn, 79, American communication scholar and consultant.
- Brian Lowe, 85, Australian footballer (City South, Geelong), complications from Parkinson's disease.
- Gray McLean, 90, Australian rugby union player (Queensland, national team).
- Laura Nikolich, 70, American video game designer (Spider-Man, Frogger II: ThreeeDeep!).
- Roger Olsson, 80, Swedish Olympic ice hockey player (1968).
- Andrejs Plakans, 83, Latvian-American historian.
- Reiner Pommerin, 81, German historian.
- Joe Robles, 78, American military general, president and CEO of the USAA (2007–2015).
- Ewy Rosqvist-von Korff, 94, Swedish rally driver.
- Jerzy Swatoń, 77, Polish politician, minister of environment (2004–2005).
- Zoran Vorotović, 65, Montenegrin footballer (Sutjeska Nikšić, Budućnost Titograd, Sarıyer).
- Larry Walton, 77, American football player (Detroit Lions, Buffalo Bills).

=== 5 ===
- K. Armstrong, 52, Indian lawyer and politician, president of the Bahujan Samaj Party (since 2007), stabbed.
- Judith Belushi-Pisano, 73, American radio and television producer (Biography, The National Lampoon Radio Hour), endometrial cancer.
- Antonio Michele Coppi, 75, Italian politician, senator (1992–1994).
- Robert A. Corrigan, 89, American academic, president of San Francisco State University (1989–2012).
- William Dear, 86, American private investigator and author (The Dungeon Master).
- Serge Ducosté, 80, Haitian footballer (Aigle Noir AC, national team).
- Anna Filek, 91, Polish politician, MP (1997–2005).
- Yvonne Furneaux, 98, French actress (Le Amiche, La Dolce Vita, Repulsion), stroke.
- Raphaël Géminiani, 99, French road bicycle racer.
- Liana Isakadze, 77, Georgian violinist.
- Nikolai Korolkov, 77, Russian equestrian, Olympic champion (1980).
- Nic Labuschagne, 93, South African-born English rugby union player (national team).
- Jon Landau, 63, American film producer (Titanic, Avatar, Alita: Battle Angel), Oscar winner (1998), cancer.
- George Mamalassery, 92, Indian Roman Catholic prelate, bishop of Tura (1979–2007), respiratory failure.
- Stanley Moss, 99, American poet.
- Sternford Moyo, 67–68, Zimbabwean lawyer, president of the International Bar Association (2021–2022).
- Surendra Nath Naik, 87, Indian politician, Odisha MLA (1971–2009).
- Ziaur Rahman, 50, Bangladeshi chess grandmaster, heart attack.
- Rodrigo Raineri, 55, Brazilian mountain climber, paragliding crash.
- Rajeswary Appahu, 29, Malaysian social media personality, suicide.
- Bhuvaneswari Ramaswamy, 59, Indian-born American oncologist and hematologist.
- Bengt I. Samuelsson, 90, Swedish biochemist, Nobel laureate (1982).
- Vic Seixas, 100, American Hall of Fame tennis player.
- Jim Shaw, 77, American politician, mayor of Rapid City, South Dakota (1997–2001, 2003–2007).
- Luna al-Shibl, 48-49, Syrian journalist and political adviser.
- Wil Tirion, 81, Dutch uranographer.
- Arunas Vasys, 80, Lithuanian-born American football player (Philadelphia Eagles).
- Elaine Wainwright, 75–76, Australian theologian and biblical scholar.

=== 6 ===
- Abdellatif Akhrif, 24, Moroccan footballer (IR Tanger), drowned.
- Lamberto Antonio, 77, Filipino poet.
- Patricia Benson, 82, American artist.
- Bernard du Boucheron, 95, French writer and industrialist, winner of Grand Prix du roman de l'Académie française.
- Jon Coulston, 67, British archaeologist, cancer.
- Pino D'Angiò, 71, Italian singer ("Ma quale idea") and songwriter ("The Age of Love").
- Mirta Díaz-Balart, 95, Cuban political consort.
- André Drege, 25, Norwegian racing cyclist, race crash.
- Joe Egan, 77, Scottish singer (Stealers Wheel) and songwriter ("Stuck in the Middle with You", "Star"), heart attack.
- Elleni Zeleke, Ethiopian-American political scientist and historian, breast cancer.
- Lionel Fernando, 88, Sri Lankan civil servant and diplomat, ambassador to France (2008–2010) and governor of North Eastern Province (1993–1994).
- Evert Hoek, 90, Zimbabwean-Canadian geotechnical engineer.
- Edgardo Huertas, 65, Puerto Rican singer, actor and show host.
- Jimmy Hurst, 52, American baseball player (Detroit Tigers), brain hemorrhage.
- Khyree Jackson, 24, American football player (Minnesota Vikings, Alabama Crimson Tide, Oregon Ducks), traffic collision.
- Zbigniew Jankowski, 92, Polish poet.
- Kimurayama, 42, Japanese sumo wrestler.
- Ludwik Konopko, 53, Polish guitarist and composer.
- Abe Krash, 97, American lawyer.
- Aza Likhitchenko, 86, Russian television and radio host.
- John Martin, 82, English cricketer (Oxford University, Somerset).
- Sonya Massey, 36, American police shooting victim, shot.
- Harry Morgan, 86, New Zealand cricketer (Wellington).
- John O'Mahony, 71, Irish politician, TD (2007–2016), and Gaelic football manager (Mayo GAA, Leitrim GAA), cancer.
- Angela Pagano, 87, Italian actress (The Hideout, Naples in Veils, Like a Cat on a Highway 2).
- Ahmed Refaat, 31, Egyptian footballer (ENPPI, Future / Modern Future, national team), heart attack.
- Mary Zeiss Stange, 74, American academic and writer.
- Roberta Taylor, 76, English actress (EastEnders, The Bill, Tom & Viv) and author, pneumonia.
- Javier Valle Riestra, 92, Peruvian jurist and politician, MP (1978–1992, 2006–2011) and prime minister (1998).
- John VanOrnum, 84, American baseball player, coach and scout.
- Juan-Miguel Villar Mir, 92, Spanish construction executive and politician, chairman of OHLA (1987–2018), minister of economy (1975–1976) and third deputy prime minister (1976).
- Teodor Zgureanu, 85, Moldovan conductor and composer.

=== 7 ===
- Eric Albronda, 78, American drummer (Blue Cheer), traffic collision.
- José María Álvarez, 82, Spanish poet and novelist.
- Tengai Amano, 64, Japanese playwright, lung cancer.
- Arnold Band, 94, American scholar.
- Haïm Brezis, 80, French mathematician (Bony–Brezis theorem, Brezis–Gallouët inequality, Brezis–Lieb lemma).
- Claude Ferragne, 71, Canadian Olympic high jumper (1976).
- Hugh Geoghegan, 86, Irish jurist, judge of the Supreme Court (2000–2010).
- Ihab al-Ghussein, 45, Palestinian politician (Hamas) and spokesman of the Interior Ministry, airstrike.
- Josefina Herrán, 94, Uruguayan first lady (1972–1976).
- Won Jang, 20, South Korean student, drowned. (body discovered on this date)
- Sydney Kirkby, 91, Australian surveyor and explorer.
- Bill Klages, 97, American lighting designer.
- Jane McAlevey, 59, American union organizer, author (A Collective Bargain), and political commentator, multiple myeloma.
- Nawab Haider Naqvi, 88, Pakistani economist and scholar.
- Peter O'Sullivan, 81, Irish hurler (Cashel King Cormacs, Tipperary).
- Yola Polastri, 74, Peruvian singer-songwriter and television presenter, heart attack.
- Jim Rotondi, 61, American jazz trumpeter.
- Anwar Sabbah, 91, Lebanese politician.
- Hassani Shapi, 50, Kenyan actor (Star Wars: Episode I – The Phantom Menace, The World Is Not Enough, Land Gold Women).
- Merrett R. Stierheim, 90, American public administrator.
- Robert Arthur Williams, 91, Canadian politician, British Columbia MLA (1966–1976, 1984–1991).
- Rachel Wyatt, 94, English-Canadian dramatist.
- Bruno Zanin, 73, Italian actor (Amarcord, Killer Cop, The First Time on the Grass).
- Barbara Zoeke, German psychologist and writer.

=== 8 ===
- Shel Bachrach, 80, American insurance broker, investor, and philanthropist.
- Ram Buxani, 83, Indian businessman and philanthropist (ITL Cosmos Group).
- Dai Darell, 72, Swedish-American comic strip writer (The Phantom) and author.
- Sérgio de Queiroz Duarte, 89–90, Brazilian diplomat. (death announced on this date)
- Marta Ferrusola, 89, Spanish businesswoman and political consort.
- Marina Kondratyeva, 90, Russian ballerina (Bolshoi Ballet).
- Jacques Lafaye, 94, French historian.
- Rafael Montalvo, 81, Salvadoran author and politician, deputy (1988–1991).
- Michael E. Moseley, 83, American archaeologist and anthropologist.
- Pierre Nguyễn Soạn, 87, Vietnamese Roman Catholic prelate, bishop of Qui Nhơn (1999–2012).
- Robert Pearson, 87, British-born American restaurateur, complications from Alzheimer's disease.
- János Petrovics, 52, Hungarian Olympic boxer (1992).
- David Power, 77, Irish bookmaker, co-founder of Paddy Power.
- C. Norman Shealy, 91, American neurosurgeon.
- Jógvan Sundstein, 91, Faroese politician, prime minister (1989–1991).
- Tony Voce, 43, American ice hockey player (Philadelphia Phantoms), heart attack.
- Xie Shaoming, 99, Chinese politician.
- Pavol Zelenay, 96, Slovak musician, co-founder of Bratislavská lýra.
- Michael Zulli, 71, American comic book artist (The Puma Blues, The Sandman, Taboo).

=== 9 ===
- Elaine Alquist, 79, American politician, member of the California State Assembly (1996–2002) and Senate (2004–2012).
- John Apthorp, 89, British businessman.
- Martine Beaugrand, 63, Canadian politician, mayor of Laval (2013).
- Joe Bonsall, 76, American Hall of Fame singer (The Oak Ridge Boys), complications from amyotrophic lateral sclerosis.
- Ian Buckett, 56, Welsh rugby union player (Swansea RFC, London Welsh, national team).
- Michael Chisholm, 93, British geographer.
- Dan Collins, 80, American journalist (U.S. News & World Report, New York Daily News) and author, complications from pneumonia and COVID-19.
- Yehuda Deri, 66, Israeli Haredi rabbi, complications from leg infection.
- Paul Evanko, 76, American law enforcement officer, commissioner of the Pennsylvania State Police (1995–2003).
- Josse Goffin, 85, Belgian artist and graphic novelist.
- Dagoberto Gutiérrez, 79, Salvadoran guerrilla, FMNL commander and politician, deputy (1994–1997).
- Diana Hill, 81, New Zealand biochemist, Fellow of the Royal Society of New Zealand (since 1997).
- Jim Inhofe, 89, American politician, member of the U.S. House of Representatives (1987–1994) and Senate (1994–2023), mayor of Tulsa, Oklahoma (1978–1984), complications from a stroke.
- David Loughery, 71, American screenwriter (Dreamscape, Star Trek V: The Final Frontier, Passenger 57), skin cancer.
- Hédi M'henni, 81, Tunisian politician, minister of the interior (2002–2004) and defence (2004–2005).
- Sharon Murdock, 77, Canadian politician, Ontario MPP (1990–1995).
- Hans Pescher, 93, German Olympic ice hockey player (1952).
- Shaila Rani Rawat, 68, Indian politician, Uttarakhand MLA (2012–2017, since 2022), spinal injury.
- Maxine Singer, 93, American biologist (Carnegie Institution for Science), chronic obstructive pulmonary disease and emphysema.
- Ana Šomlo, 89, Serbian-Israeli writer and journalist.
- Sven Steinmo, 70, American political scientist.
- Barry Studdert, 85, Irish Gaelic footballer (St Finbarr's, Cork).
- Jerzy Stuhr, 77, Polish actor (Camera Buff, Kingsajz, Kiler), film director and screenwriter.
- Yacoub Al-Subaie, 79, Kuwaiti poet.
- James R. Tallon, 82, American politician, member (1975–1993) and acting speaker (1991) of the New York State Assembly, idiopathic pulmonary fibrosis.
- Miguel Urrutia Montoya, 85, Colombian economist, minister of mines (1977) and general manager of the Bank of the Republic (1993–2005).
- Hetty Verolme, 94, Dutch-Australian writer, educator, and Holocaust survivor.
- Joana Marques Vidal, 68, Portuguese prosecutor, attorney general (2012–2018), complications from cancer surgery.
- Barry Wellman, 81, American-born Canadian sociologist.
- Jens Werner, 59, Danish ballroom dancer, cancer.
- Ernest Zongo, 60, Burkinabé cyclist.

=== 10 ===
- Olaide Adewale Akinremi, 51, Nigerian politician, MP (since 2019).
- Robert L. Allen, 82, American activist, writer (Black Awakening in Capitalist America) and academic.
- Bob Banks, 94, Australian rugby league player (Eastern Suburbs, Queensland, national team).
- Neil Clabo, 71, American football player (Minnesota Vikings), complications from Alzheimer's disease.
- Ron Clinkscale, 90, American football player (BC Lions, Calgary Stampeders).
- Giovanni Andrea Cornia, 77, Italian development economist. (death announced on this date)
- Kirsten Dehlholm, 79, Danish artist and theatre artistic director.
- Joe Engle, 91, American astronaut (STS-2, STS-51-I).
- Dennis Flannigan, 84, American politician, member of the Washington House of Representatives (2003–2011).
- Makid Haider, 76, Bangladeshi poet and writer.
- Thomas Hoepker, 88, German photographer, complications from Alzheimer's disease.
- Alex Janvier, 89, Canadian First Nations painter.
- Thomas Alan Johnston, 79, Scottish engineer.
- Dave Loggins, 76, American singer and songwriter ("Please Come to Boston", "Pieces of April", "If I Had My Wish Tonight").
- Zonke Majodina, 77, South African psychologist and human rights worker, member of the United Nations Human Rights Committee (2013–2021).
- Markos Mamalakis, 91, Greek economist.
- Alphonsus Mathias, 96, Indian Roman Catholic prelate, bishop of Chikmagalur (1965–1986) and archbishop of Bangalore (1986–1998).
- John McKibbon, 84, Canadian Olympic basketball player.
- Mary C. Moran, 90, American politician, mayor of Bridgeport, Connecticut (1989–1991).
- Marc Nerlove, 90, American economist.
- Bogusław Nowak, 72, Polish speedway rider (Stal Gorzów Wielkopolski, Unia Tarnów).
- Frank O'Neill, 97, Australian Olympic swimmer (1952).
- Nita Rinehart, 83, American politician, member of the Washington House of Representatives (1979–1983) and Senate (1983–1996).
- Tommy F. Robinson, 82, American politician, member of the U.S. House of Representatives (1985–1991).
- Matthijs Röling, 81, Dutch painter, euthanasia.
- Fred Rosner, 88, American academic and doctor.
- Hans-Otto Schumacher, 74, German slalom canoeist, Olympic silver medallist (1972).
- Peter Steedman, 80, Australian journalist and politician, MP (1983–1984).
- Jānis Straume, 61, Latvian politician and doctor, speaker of the Saeima (1998–2002), suicide by train.
- Roy Syversson, 84, Swedish Olympic racewalker (1964).
- Torao Tokuda, 86, Japanese physician and politician, member of the House of Representatives (1990–2005), complications from amyotrophic lateral sclerosis.
- Hughie Travers, 81, Irish Gaelic footballer (Four Masters, Donegal).
- Georgette Valle, 99, American politician, member of the Washington House of Representatives (1965–1983, 1987–1997).
- Marian Velicu, 47, Romanian Olympic boxer (2000).
- Jane Ying Wu, 60-61, Chinese-American neuroscientist, suicide.

=== 11 ===
- Hope Alswang, 77, American museum director (Norton Museum of Art), pancreatic cancer.
- Aparna, 57, Indian television presenter (Bigg Boss Kannada), comedian (Majaa Talkies), and actress (Masanada Hoovu), lung cancer.
- Dave Buss, 86, American college basketball coach (Green Bay, Long Beach State Beach).
- Tommy Drennan, 82, Irish singer.
- Shelley Duvall, 75, American actress (The Shining, Nashville, 3 Women), complications from diabetes.
- M. J. Engh, 91, American author.
- Dudley Eustace, 88, British businessman.
- Fan Younian, 80, Chinese politician.
- Heinrich Fürst zu Fürstenberg, 73, German landowner, head of the House of Fürstenberg (since 2002).
- Niall Hopper, 88, Scottish footballer (Queen's Park, national amateur team).
- Monte Kiffin, 84, American football coach (Tampa Bay Buccaneers).
- Willi Koslowski, 87, German footballer (Schalke 04, Rot-Weiss Essen, West Germany national team).
- Bas Maliepaard, 86, Dutch road racing cyclist.
- Mohamed Dzaiddin Abdullah, 85, Malaysian jurist, chief justice (2000–2003), heart attack.
- Mark Nakashima, 61, American politician, member (since 2008) and vice speaker (2018–2021) of the Hawaii House of Representatives, kidney failure.
- Thomas Neff, 80, American physicist.
- Nana Nuriana, 86, Indonesian military officer, governor of West Java (1993–2003).
- Edward Redliński, 84, Polish novelist, publicist, and dramatist.
- Tomas Seyler, 49, German darts player.
- Tony Shiels, 86, British artist, magician, and writer.
- Tim Sneller, 68, American politician, member of the Michigan House of Representatives (2017–2022).
- Barry Stern, 91, Australian art dealer.
- Andrei Tarasenko, 55, Russian Olympic ice hockey player (1994).
- Grace Eiko Thomson, 90, Japanese-Canadian World War II internee.
- Stanley Tshabalala, 75, South African footballer and coach (Kaizer Chiefs, Orlando Pirates, Mamelodi Sundowns), complications from gunshot wounds.
- Gilaman Wazir, 32, Afghan poet and Pashtun activist.
- Gail Wilensky, 81, American health economist.
- Alan Wyatt, 89, Australian cricketer (New South Wales).
- Yazid bin Abdul Qadir Jawas, 61, Indonesian Islamic scholar.

=== 12 ===
- Cornelius J. Barton, 88, American metallurgical engineer.
- Bob Booker, 92, American writer and record producer (The First Family), heart failure.
- Ellis Brandon, 101, Dutch veteran (Engelandvaarder).
- Ian Cameron, 74, British car designer (Rolls-Royce), stabbed.
- Jan Cych, 80, Polish Olympic middle-distance runner (1968).
- Kenneth T. Derr, 87, American businessman, CEO of Chevron Corporation (1989–1999).
- Tonke Dragt, 93, Dutch writer (The Letter for the King, The Secrets of the Wild Wood).
- Richard English, 81, English cricketer (Suffolk).
- Alex Forsyth, 69, Canadian ice hockey player (Washington Capitals, Springfield Indians, Tulsa Oilers), complications from Alzheimer's disease.
- Rod Fyffe, 75, Australian politician, four-time mayor of Bendigo.
- Marcel Zagoli Golié, 63, Ivorian footballer (Africa Sports d'Abidjan).
- Billy Ibadulla, 88, Pakistani-New Zealand cricketer (Warwickshire, Otago, Pakistan national team).
- J. Saul Kane, 55, English DJ, musician and producer (Vinyl Solution), complications from diabetes and multiple sclerosis.
- Robert Lawson, 97, Australian politician, Victoria MP (1979–1992).
- Lee Woo-jae, 90, South Korean politician, minister of information and communication (1989–1990).
- John Lewis, 89, English Anglican clergyman, archdeacon of Cheltenham (1988–1998).
- Janice Monk, 87, Australian-born American feminist geographer.
- Jens Odewald, 83, German business executive (Kaufhof AG).
- Noriko Ohara, 88, Japanese voice actress (Time Bokan, Future Boy Conan, Heidi, Girl of the Alps).
- Rafat Saeed Qureshi, 77, Indian historian and writer.
- Abel Sarmientos, 61, Cuban Olympic volleyball player (1992).
- William T. Shea, 94, American politician, member of the Connecticut House of Representatives (1959–1967).
- Leif Solheim, 91, Norwegian ice hockey player (Furuset Ishockey, national team).
- Bill Viola, 73, American video artist, complications from Alzheimer's disease.
- Ruth Westheimer, 96, German-American sex therapist and Holocaust survivor.
- Val Winter, 80, Australian Olympic fencer.
- Evan Wright, 59, American journalist and author (Generation Kill, Hella Nation, American Desperado), suicide by gunshot.
- Nabih Youssef, 80, Egyptian-born American structural engineer.
- Zhang Cunhao, 96, Chinese physical chemist, member of the Chinese Academy of Sciences.
- Russell Zimmer, 98, American politician, member of the Wyoming House of Representatives (1973–1977) and Senate (1977–1992).

=== 13 ===
- Judy Alter, 85, American novelist.
- Tom Azinger, 89, American politician, member of the West Virginia House of Delegates (1995–2014, 2018–2020).
- Clare R. Baltazar, 96, Filipino entomologist.
- Rui Baltazar, 91, Mozambican politician, MP (1975–1992), minister of justice (1975–1978) and finance (1978–1986).
- Leïla Mezian Benjelloun, Moroccan philanthropist.
- Pedro Bustos, 96, Argentine basketball player (national team), world champion (1950).
- Joseph Carrara, 86, French racing cyclist.
- Thomas Matthew Crooks, 20, American gunman (attempted assassination of Donald Trump), shot.
- Mohammed Deif, 58, Palestinian militant, airstrike.
- Shannen Doherty, 53, American actress (Beverly Hills, 90210, Charmed, Heathers), breast cancer.
- Rodney C. Ewing, 77, American mineralogist.
- Ruth Hesse, 87, German dramatic mezzo-soprano (Deutsche Oper Berlin 1962–1995).
- Erwin Junker, 94, German manufacturer.
- Bill Killen, 85, American politician, member of the Idaho House of Representatives (2006–2012).
- P. Buckley Moss, 91, American artist.
- Naomi Pomeroy, 49, American chef and restaurateur (Clarklewis), drowned.
- Flemming Rasmussen, 56, Danish strongman competitor and powerlifter.
- Claudio Reyes, 64, Chilean singer, actor (Cesante) and politician, heart attack.
- José Antonio Sacristán Rodríguez, 87, Spanish politician, senator (1989–1993, 2004–2008).
- Rafa Salama, Palestinian militant, airstrike.
- Arnold Schulz, 81, German Olympic volleyball player.
- James B. Sikking, 90, American actor (Hill Street Blues, Doogie Howser, M.D., The Pelican Brief), complications from dementia.
- Richard Simmons, 76, American fitness instructor and television personality (General Hospital, Match Game, Hollywood Squares), complications from a fall.
- Ron E Sparks, 72, Australian broadcaster and voiceover artist, cancer.
- Chester J. Straub, 87, American jurist and politician, judge of the U.S. Court of Appeals for the Second Circuit (since 1998), member of the New York State Assembly (1967–1972) and Senate (1973–1975).
- Bob Tischler, 78, American television writer and producer (Saturday Night Live, Empty Nest, Boy Meets World), pancreatic cancer.
- Tobias, 75, Brazilian footballer (Guarani, Corinthians, Rio Negro).
- Chino Trinidad, 56, Filipino sports journalist and executive, heart attack.
- Ingrīda Ūdre, 65, Latvian politician, speaker of the Saeima (2002–2006).
- Blaho Uhlár, 72, Slovak theatre director.
- Iliya Valov, 62, Bulgarian football player (Botev Vratsa, CSKA Sofia, national team) and manager, lung infection.
- Babis Vovos, 91, Greek civil engineer and businessman.
- Enrique Wong Pujada, 83, Peruvian politician, deputy (1985–1990, 2011–2016, since 2021), cancer.
- Dimitar Zapryanov, 64, Bulgarian judoka, Olympic silver medallist (1980).

=== 14 ===
- Julien Andavo Mbia, 73, Congolese Roman Catholic prelate, bishop of Isiro–Niangara (since 2003).
- Tupeni Baba, 82, Fijian academic and politician, MP (1987, 1999–2001), deputy prime minister and minister for foreign affairs (1999–2000).
- Donna Berwick, 66, American costume designer (Da 5 Bloods, Inside Man, Juice), breast cancer.
- Richie Browne, 90, Irish hurler (Castletownroche, Avondhu, Cork).
- Sérgio Cabral, 87, Brazilian journalist and writer, pulmonary emphysema and complications from Alzheimer's disease.
- Sir Roderick Carnegie, 91, Australian businessman.
- Sarah Gibson, 38, American pianist and composer, colon cancer.
- Katrina Hanse-Himarwa, 57, Namibian politician, minister of education, arts, and culture (2015–2019), governor of Hardap (2004–2015), cancer.
- Jacoby Jones, 40, American football player (Baltimore Ravens, Houston Texans, San Diego Chargers), Super Bowl champion (2012).
- Romildo Magalhães, 78, Brazilian politician, governor of Acre (1992–1995), mayor of Feijó (1979–1982, 1997–2000), complications from diabetes.
- M. Mani, 77, Indian film producer and director (Kuyiline Thedi, Engane Nee Marakkum, Aanakkorumma).
- Marcela Miró, 72, Spanish politician and agricultural engineer, president of the Valencian Courts (1999–2003).
- John Moses, 86, British Anglican priest, dean of St Paul's (1996–2006).
- Larry Poncino, 67, American baseball umpire.
- Salvatore Puntillo, 88, Italian actor (A Stranger in Town, What Have They Done to Your Daughters?, Gangbuster), heart attack.
- Bengt Rask, 96, Swedish Olympic swimmer (1952).
- Modesto Roma Júnior, 71, Brazilian businessman, president of Santos FC (2014–2017).
- Teresa San Román Espinosa, 83–84, Spanish anthropologist and academic.
- Jim Sandral, 91, Australian footballer (Melbourne).
- Sylvain Saudan, 87, Swiss extreme skier, heart attack.
- Earl W. Schmidt, 88, American politician and jurist, member of the Wisconsin State Assembly (1975–1982).
- Johann Seitinger, 63, Austrian politician, member of the Landtag Styria (2003–2023).
- Roger Sherman, 83, American politician, member of the Maine House of Representatives (1998–2006, 2014–2018) and Senate (2006–2014).
- Jerry Walker, 85, American baseball player (Baltimore Orioles, Kansas City Athletics, Cleveland Indians), heart attack.
- Shiro Yadama, 80, Japanese author (Fair, then Partly Piggy).
- Zhang Shourong, 96, Chinese metallurgist and academician.

=== 15 ===
- Simon Boas, 47, British aid worker, throat cancer.
- Jacques Boudet, 89, French actor (The Names of Love, Swann in Love, Father and Sons).
- Nelson Chittum, 91, American baseball player (Boston Red Sox, St. Louis Cardinals).
- Juan Fernando Cobo, 64, Colombian painter, illustrator, and sculptor.
- Wieteke van Dort, 81, Dutch actress and singer, liver cancer.
- Juan Ricardo Faccio, 87, Uruguayan football player (Nacional) and manager (Peñarol, El Salvador national team).
- Kenneth Heilman, 86, American behavioral neurologist.
- Hyun Cheol, 81, South Korean singer.
- Ken Jenkin, 92, English footballer (Grimsby Town).
- Harvey Karten, 89, American neuroscientist.
- Jorge Luís, 66, Brazilian footballer (Flamengo, Athletico Paranaense).
- Édith Lejet, 82, French composer.
- Kevin Manning, 90, Australian Roman Catholic prelate, bishop of Armidale (1991–1997) and Parramatta (1997–2010).
- Whitney Rydbeck, 79, American actor (Friday the 13th Part VI: Jason Lives, 1941, Battle Beyond the Stars), complications from prostate cancer.
- Salomon Schulman, 76, Swedish author, translator, and pediatrician.
- Jay Slater, 19, Spanish-born British man, head trauma. (body discovered on this date)
- David Tall, 83, English mathematician.
- Teoh Teik Huat, 77, Malaysian politician, Penang state assemblyman (1990–1995) and MP (1986–1990), complications from surgery.
- Tomcraft, 49, German DJ and producer.
- Nicolas van de Walle, 67, American political scientist.
- John G. Williams, 77, Canadian politician, MP (1993–2008).

=== 16 ===
- Abu Sayed, 22, Bangladeshi student activist, shot.
- Ekene Abubakar Adams, 39, Nigerian politician, member of the House of Representatives.
- Frank Arnett, 92, Canadian ice hockey player (Seattle Totems, Winnipeg Warriors, Los Angeles Blades).
- Mohammad Bhar, 24, Palestinian man, mauled by dog. (death announced on this date)
- Joe Bryant, 69, American basketball player (Philadelphia 76ers, San Diego Clippers, Houston Rockets) and coach, complications from a stroke.
- Giuseppe Caglioti, 92, Italian physicist, member of the Italian Physical Society.
- April Cantelo, 96, English soprano.
- James Michael Cline, 64, American financier, founder of Fandango, jumped.
- Marshall Cooke, 86, Australian politician, MP (1972–1974).
- Peter Courtney, 81, American politician, member of the Oregon House of Representatives (1981–1985, 1989–1999) and Senate (1999–2023), complications from cancer.
- Ulf Dageby, 80, Swedish rock musician and songwriter (Nationalteatern).
- Tony Delsham, 78, French journalist (Antilla) and writer.
- Benoît Duteurtre, 64, French novelist and music critic, heart attack.
- Tom Fenton, 94, American journalist and television correspondent (CBS News).
- Publio Fiori, 86, Italian politician, minister of transport (1994–1995) and deputy (1979–2006).
- Silvana Forcellini, 81, Italian weightlifter.
- Norm Hewitt, 55, New Zealand rugby union player (Hawke's Bay, Wellington, national team), complications from motor neurone disease.
- Manfred Kirchheimer, 93, American documentary film maker (Stations of the Elevated, We Were So Beloved, Art Is... The Permanent Revolution) and professor.
- Jean-Pierre Lecompte, 83, French rugby league player (Stade Toulousain, Saint-Gaudens Bears, national team).
- Melissa Militano, 69, American Olympic figure skater (1972).
- David Morrow, 71, Australian sports commentator (ABC, 2GB), brain cancer.
- Dhammika Niroshana, 41, Sri Lankan cricketer (Chilaw Marians, Galle), shot.
- George Poteet, 75, American land speed racer.
- Ram Chandra Poudyal, 80, Indian politician, member of the Sikkim State Council (1974–1975) and Legislative Assembly (1975–1979). (body discovered on this date)
- Lorenz Bruno Puntel, 88, Brazilian-born German philosopher.
- Bernice Johnson Reagon, 81, American singer (The Freedom Singers, Sweet Honey in the Rock) and activist.
- Irène Schweizer, 83, Swiss jazz and free improvising pianist.
- Bob Templeton, 96, Australian rules footballer (Footscray).
- Mikhail Viarheyenka, 74, Belarusian football player (Dinamo Minsk) and manager (Dinamo Minsk, national team).
- Kathy Willens, 74, American photographer and photojournalist, ovarian cancer.

=== 17 ===
- Jana Bommersbach, 78, American journalist (Phoenix New Times, The Arizona Republic) and author.
- Guadalupe Briseño, 90–91, American civil rights activist. (death announced on this date)
- Vincent Burns, 43, American football player (Kentucky Wildcats, Indianapolis Colts).
- José Cerveró, 74, Spanish footballer (Valencia).
- Ken Charlton, 83, American basketball player (Colorado Buffaloes), complications from Alzheimer's disease.
- Cheng Pei-pei, 78, Hong Kong actress (Come Drink with Me, Crouching Tiger, Hidden Dragon, Mulan), complications from corticobasal degeneration.
- Bob Chlupsa, 78, American baseball player (St. Louis Cardinals).
- William W. Cooley, 94, American educational researcher and author.
- Richard K. Diran, 74, American gemologist and adventurer.
- Doug Faulkner, 82, Canadian politician, mayor of Wood Buffalo (1997–2004).
- Björn Friberg, 75, Swedish footballer (Malmö FF, IFK Trelleborg).
- Mary Gibby, 75, British botanist and academic.
- Bjørn Hernæs, 87, Norwegian politician, MP (1993–2005).
- Kea Homan, 85, Dutch painter and graphic artist.
- Sai Hsai Mao, 76, Burmese singer and musician.
- Sigma Huda, 79, Bangladeshi lawyer and human rights activist.
- Anton Hykisch, 92, Slovak writer, politician and diplomat, MP (1990–1992).
- Katica Ivanišević, 89, Croatian professor and politician, speaker of the Chamber of Counties (1994–1997, 1997–2001).
- Mark Kennedy, 72, American judge, justice of the Supreme Court of Alabama (1989–1999).
- Michael Kenny, 60, New Zealand Olympic heavyweight boxer (1984).
- Martin H. Krieger, 80, American urban and regional planner, professor at the University of Southern California.
- Marcela Krinke-Susmelj, 58, Czechoslovak-born Swiss Olympic dressage rider (2016).
- Alcides Lanza, 95, Argentine-born Canadian composer.
- Leo McAdam, 95, Canadian politician, New Brunswick MLA (1987–1995).
- Farhad Moshiri, 61, Iranian artist.
- Waldo Ramos, 80, Spanish football manager (Palamós, Girona, Málaga).
- Rosa Regàs, 90, Spanish writer and novelist.
- Odd Kristian Reme, 71, Norwegian priest and politician.
- Mercedes Román, 78, Mexican Olympic athlete (1968).
- Stu Starner, 81, American basketball coach (Montana State Bobcats, UTSA Roadrunners).
- Avraham Trahtman, 80, Soviet-born Israeli mathematician and academic.
- Happy Traum, 86, American folk singer.
- M. S. Valiathan, 90, Indian cardiac surgeon and academic administrator, vice-chancellor of MAHE (1974–1999).
- Pat Williams, 84, American basketball executive (Orlando Magic, Philadelphia 76ers), complications from viral pneumonia.

=== 18 ===
- Christine Ayoub, 102, Canadian-born American mathematician.
- Gail Lumet Buckley, 86, American journalist and author, heart failure.
- Doudas Leydi Camara, 76, Senegalese Olympic basketball player (1968, 1972).
- Leo Chaloukian, 97, American sound engineer.
- Thierry Chopin, Canadian phycologist and academic.
- Leo Cotte, 77, Puerto Rican politician, mayor of Lajas (2009–2013).
- Richard Cottrell, 81, English politician, MEP (1979–1989).
- Lou Dobbs, 78, American political commentator (Lou Dobbs Tonight), television producer (CNNfn) and writer.
- Stewart Duncan, 84, Australian footballer (Fitzroy).
- Harry Dym, 86, Israeli-born American mathematician.
- Jerry Fuller, 85, American songwriter ("Young Girl", "Travelin' Man", "Show and Tell"), lung cancer.
- Jean-Pierre Goudeau, 91, French Olympic runner (1952, 1956).
- Abner Haynes, 86, American football player (Kansas City Chiefs, Denver Broncos).
- Noel Hazard, 88, Australian Olympic boxer (1956).
- Jeremy N. McNeil, 79, English-Canadian biologist and zoologist.
- Mir Mugdho, 25, Bangladeshi student activist, shot.
- Bob Newhart, 94, American comedian and actor (The Bob Newhart Show, Newhart, Elf), Emmy (2013) and Grammy (1961) winner.
- Olga Ramos Peña, 98, American political organizer and activist.
- Thomas Maurice Rice, 85, Irish-born Swiss theoretical physicist.
- Fresia Saavedra, 90, Ecuadorian teacher and singer-songwriter, kidney and liver failure.
- P. Selvadurai, 92, Singaporean politician, MP (1967–1984).
- Ambica Shrestha, 91, Nepali hotelier, president of Dwarika's Hotel (since 1992), pneumonia.
- Fritz Verzetnitsch, 79, Austrian trade unionist and politician, president of the Austrian Trade Union Federation (1987–2006) and the ETUC (1993–2003).

=== 19 ===
- Marvin Barkis, 81, American politician, member (1979–1993) and speaker (1991–1993) of the Kansas House of Representatives.
- Peter Biroš, 74, Slovak politician, MP (2002–2006)
- William Andreas Brown, 93, American diplomat, ambassador to Thailand (1985–1988) and to Israel (1988–1992).
- Trevor Burnard, 63, New Zealand historian.
- Helio R. Camargo, 98, Brazilian LDS religious leader, first (1985–1989) and second (1989–1990) quorum of the Seventy.
- Montserrat Candini, 66, Spanish politician, mayor of Calella (2011–2022), senator (2008–2015) and member of the Catalan parliament (2015–2017), cancer.
- Carole Condé, 84, Canadian artist.
- Josefina Constantino, 104, Filipino cloistered nun, poet, and essayist.
- Toumani Diabaté, 58, Malian kora player.
- John Dittmer, 84, American historian.
- Iryna Farion, 60, Ukrainian linguist, professor, and politician, deputy (2012–2014), shot.
- Peik Gästrin, 90, Finnish Olympic sailor.
- Kevan Gosper, 90, Australian athlete and sports administrator, Olympic silver medallist (1956), chairman of the AIS (1981–1985).
- David Ish-Horowicz, 75, British scientist, brain tumour.
- Sheila Jackson Lee, 74, American politician, member of the U.S. House of Representatives (since 1995), pancreatic cancer.
- Jacek Jaworek, 55, Polish fugitive. (body found on this date)
- Duraid Kashmoula, 81, Iraqi politician, governor of Nineveh (2004–2009).
- Domenico Crescentino Marinozzi, 97, Italian Roman Catholic prelate, vicar apostolic of Soddo (1982–2007).
- Peter McDowell, 86, American politician, member of the Massachusetts House of Representatives (1975–1979).
- Béla Melis, 64, Hungarian footballer (Békéscsaba, Rába ETO, Debreceni MVSC).
- Nguyễn Phú Trọng, 80, Vietnamese politician, general secretary of the Communist Party (since 2011), president (2018–2021) and chairman of the National Assembly (2006–2011).
- Aldo Puglisi, 89, Italian actor (Seduced and Abandoned, The Birds, the Bees and the Italians, Secret Fantasy), COVID-19.
- Ray Reardon, 91, Welsh snooker player, six-time world champion, cancer.
- Eliyahu Rips, 75, Israeli mathematician.
- Jon Sarkin, 71, American artist.
- James C. Scott, 87, American anthropologist, political scientist, and author (The Moral Economy of the Peasant, The Art of Not Being Governed, Against the Grain: A Deep History of the Earliest States).
- Wolfgang Smith, 94, Austrian mathematician, physicist, and philosopher.
- Hugh Stewart, 96, American tennis player.
- Ron Stockin, 93, English footballer (Wolverhampton Wanderers, Cardiff City, Grimsby Town).
- Zemaryalai Tarzi, 84–85, Afghan archaeologist.
- Esta TerBlanche, 51, South African actress (All My Children, Egoli: Place of Gold), intracranial hemorrhage.
- Dennis Trevelyan, 94, British civil servant.
- Tai Tsun Wu, 90, Chinese-born American physicist.

=== 20 ===
- Luís Caliço, 54, Portuguese Olympic windsurfer (1988).
- Mike Ferraro, 79, American baseball player (New York Yankees, Seattle Pilots/Milwaukee Brewers).
- Silvia Glatthard, 94, Swiss Olympic alpine skier (1952).
- Mel Held, 95, American baseball player (Baltimore Orioles).
- Manuel Laínz, 101, Spanish Roman Catholic priest, botanist and entomologist.
- Lin Shangyang, 92, Chinese welding engineer, member of the Chinese Academy of Engineering.
- Nil Tun Maung, 92, Burmese Olympic weightlifter.
- Jerry Miller, 81, American musician (Moby Grape) and songwriter.
- Moacir, 54, Brazilian footballer (Atlético Mineiro, Sevilla, national team).
- Pádraig O'Neill, 58, Irish Gaelic footballer (Cooley Kickhams, Armagh, Louth), complications from a heart attack.
- Edward A. Panelli, 92, American judge, justice of the Supreme Court of California (1985–1994).
- Jim Pitts, 77, American politician, member of the Texas House of Representatives (1993–2015).
- Sandy Posey, 80, American singer ("Single Girl", "Born a Woman", "I Take It Back"), complications from dementia.
- Kamala Pujari, 74, Indian organic farming advocate.
- Robert Rinchard, 93, Belgian race walker.
- Jill Schary Robinson, 88, American novelist.
- Malvin Ruderman, 97, American physicist.
- Eva Swartz, 68, Swedish culture and media businesswoman (TV4, Norstedts förlag).
- J. Remington Wilde, 72, American songwriter.

=== 21 ===
- Elisabet Borsiin Bonnier, 74, Swedish diplomat, ambassador to Estonia (1998–2003), Israel (2007–2010), and Ireland (2010–2014).
- Laurie Byers, 83, New Zealand politician and Olympic cyclist (1964).
- Peter S. Carmichael, 58, American historian.
- Ron Charles, 65, American basketball player (Michigan State, Caja de Ronda, Detroit Spirits).
- Ken Eastham, 96, British politician, MP (1979–1997).
- Gus Fleischli, 98, American politician, member of the Wyoming House of Representatives (1973–1979).
- Edgar Friedli, 90, Swiss Olympic runner (1968).
- Dercy Furtado, 96, Brazilian politician and women's rights activist, member of the Municipal Chamber of Porto Alegre (1973–1974) and the Legislative Assembly of Rio Grande do Sul (1975–1986).
- Ambalapuzha Gopakumar, 80, Indian poet and historian.
- Sir Kenneth Grange, 95, British industrial designer.
- Guan Kai, 76, Chinese lieutenant general.
- Dayle Hammock, 76, American politician, member of the South Dakota House of Representatives (2019–2020).
- Randy Kehler, 80, American activist.
- Kim Min-ki, 73, South Korean singer-songwriter ("Morning Dew") and playwright, stomach cancer.
- Henry M. Joko-Smart, 91, Sierra Leonean law professor and jurist, justice of the supreme court (1998–2005), chair of UNCITRAL (1988, 2002). (death announced on this date)
- Hugues Landon, 94, French Olympic equestrian (1964).
- Henry J. Nowak, 89, American politician, member of the U.S. House of Representatives (1975–1993).
- Brendan Pereira, 95, Indian advertising executive.
- George Pickett, 85, British physicist.
- Salvatore Piscicelli, 76, Italian film director, screenwriter (The Opportunities of Rosa, Blues metropolitano, Regina) and film critic.
- Richie Sandoval, 63, American boxer, WBA bantamweight champion (1984–1986).
- Eugene Sârbu, 73, Romanian classical violinist.
- Gemma Sena Chiesa, 95, Italian archaeologist.
- Walter Shapiro, 77, American journalist (The New Republic), columnist and author, cancer.
- Mac Sweeney, 68, American politician, member of the U.S. House of Representatives (1985–1989).
- Evelyn Thomas, 70, American singer ("High Energy").
- Julia Uceda, 98, Spanish teacher and poet.
- Stanley York, 92, American politician, member of the Wisconsin State Assembly (1967–1970).
- Joji Yuasa, 94, Japanese contemporary classical composer, pneumonia.

=== 22 ===
- Jerzy Artysz, 93, Polish opera singer (Grand Theatre, Warsaw) and music teacher (Chopin University of Music).
- Beauregarde, 88, American professional wrestler (PNW) and musician.
- Klara Berkovich, 96, Soviet-born American violinist and music teacher.
- Don Buchwald, 88, American talent agent.
- Shmuel Butman, 81, American rabbi.
- Mark Carnevale, 64, American golfer and sportscaster.
- David Crawford, 93, American astronomer.
- Alex Dancyg, 75–76, Polish-born Israeli historian and hostage. (death announced on this date)
- Karel Dyba, 83, Czech economist, politician, and diplomat, ambassador to the OECD (2007–2012).
- Duke Fakir, 88, American Hall of Fame singer (Four Tops), heart failure.
- Mohamed Fareed, 76–77, Egyptian intelligence officer, director of the General Intelligence Service (2013–2014).
- Elisabeth Fleetwood, 96, Swedish politician, MP (1979–2002).
- Nathan F. Ford, 97, American politician, member of the Tennessee House of Representatives (1977–1988).
- Joanne Frye, 80, American scholar.
- Constantin Gruiescu, 79, Romanian Olympic boxer (1972, 1976).
- Len Haley, 92, Canadian ice hockey player (Detroit Red Wings).
- Michael Hardy, 69, American civil rights attorney, cancer.
- Germaine Hoffmann, 94, Luxembourgish painter and collage artist.
- Dietmar Kolbus, 58, German chess player.
- Jerry W. Krupinski, 83, American politician, member of the Ohio House of Representatives (1987–2000).
- Jorge Alberto Lara Rivera, 57, Mexican lawyer and politician, deputy (2000–2003).
- Janet Mackey, 71, New Zealand politician, MP (1993–2005).
- Elena Mauti Nunziata, 77, Italian opera singer.
- John Mayall, 90, English Hall of Fame musician (John Mayall & the Bluesbreakers) and songwriter ("I'm Your Witchdoctor", "Crawling Up a Hill").
- Maarja Nummert, 80, Estonian architect.
- Willem van der Poel, 97, Dutch computer scientist (ZEBRA).
- Rameau Poleon, 95, St. Lucian folk fiddler.
- Saeed Rad, 79, Iranian actor (Adieu Friend, Daadshah, Eagles), complications from a fall.
- Sandra B. Rosenthal, 87, American philosopher.
- Carolyn Schuler, 81, American swimmer, double Olympic champion (1960).
- Artémon Simbananiye, 88–89, Burundian politician, minister of justice (1965–1972) and foreign affairs (1971–1974).
- Sir James Stirling, 93, British army officer and chartered surveyor, Lord Lieutenant of Stirling and Falkirk (1983–2005), chest infection.
- Ralph Thomas, 94, American football player (Chicago Cardinals, Washington Redskins).
- Alexander Waugh, 60, English writer, critic and journalist, prostate cancer.
- Ros Whiting, 66, New Zealand accounting academic.

=== 23 ===
- Keith Albarn, 85, English artist, cancer.
- Dick Asher, 92, American lawyer and record executive.
- E. Jennifer Ashworth, 84–85, Canadian philosopher, stroke.
- Jack Connors, 82, American advertising executive and philanthropist, pancreatic cancer.
- Richard Crawford, 89, American music historian, heart failure.
- Devon, 61, English-born Canadian rapper.
- Patrick K. Doughty, 55, American sports announcer (Charlotte Hornets).
- Teresa Gimpera, 87, Spanish model and actress (Eagles Over London, The Legend of Frenchie King, Course Completed).
- Mircea Grabovschi, 71, Romanian handball player, Olympic silver medallist (1976).
- Gu Shanqing, 92, Chinese general, political commissioner of the Beijing Military Region (1992–1996) and Chengdu Military Region (1990–1992).
- Vladimir Kravchenko, 76, Russian Olympic swimmer (1968).
- C. T. Kurien, 93, Indian economist.
- Lewis H. Lapham, 89, American writer (Harper's Magazine), founder of Lapham's Quarterly.
- Max Leitner, 66, Italian robber.
- Michel Lezeau, 81, French politician, mayor of Ballan-Miré (1977–2007) and deputy (2007–2010).
- Luiche, 82, Spanish football player (Calvo Sotelo) and manager (Castellón, Alcoyano).
- Mark Mallia, 59, Maltese painter and sculptor, complications from an aneurysm.
- Jim Ninowski, 88, American football player (Cleveland Browns, Washington Redskins).
- Vladimír Novák, 77, Czech painter.
- Pat Owens, 83, American politician, mayor of Grand Forks, North Dakota (1996–2000).
- Ken Palmer, 87, English cricket player (Somerset, national team) and umpire, complications from a fall.
- María Paz Troncoso, 48, Chilean politician.
- José María Peña San Martín, 86, Spanish politician, mayor of Burgos (1979–1992).
- Jude Perera, 71, Sri Lankan-born Australian politician.
- Fred Potter, 83, English footballer (Aston Villa, Doncaster Rovers, Hereford United).
- Mel Ramsden, 79, British conceptual artist.
- Robin Warren, 87, Australian pathologist, Nobel laureate (2005).
- Yury Zakharov, 86, Russian chemist and academic administrator, rector of Kemerovo State University (1978–2005).

=== 24 ===
- Shafin Ahmed, 63, Bangladeshi singer-songwriter (Miles), heart and kidney failure.
- Torkjell Berulfsen, 81, Norwegian broadcaster (NRK).
- Leo Burke, 76, Canadian professional wrestler (GPW, Stampede, WWC).
- Antonio Cabán Vale, 81, Puerto Rican guitarist, singer, and composer.
- Jimmy Crawford, 86, English pop singer ("I Love How You Love Me").
- John Edwin Davenport, 96, American politician, member of the North Carolina House of Representatives (1973–1979).
- Shekinah Elmore, 42, American oncologist.
- Mahbubul Haque, 75, Bangladeshi linguist.
- Hamzah Haz, 84, Indonesian politician, vice president (2001–2004), minister of investment (1998–1999), and deputy (1971–1999).
- Alan Hyland, 78, Canadian politician, Alberta MLA (1975–1993).
- Susan Justice, 44, American pop rock singer-songwriter and guitarist.
- Dmytro Kiva, 81, Ukrainian engineer.
- Ray Lawler, 103, Australian playwright (Summer of the Seventeenth Doll, The Man Who Shot the Albatross).
- Denny Lemaster, 85, American baseball player (Milwaukee/Atlanta Braves, Houston Astros, Montreal Expos).
- Guntila Muleya, 44, Zambian businessman, shot. (body discovered on this date)
- John Nesselroade, 88, American psychologist.
- Tom Scott, 91, American politician, member of the West Virginia State Senate (1994–1998).
- Patrick Stoddart, 79, British journalist and media consultant.
- Krisztián Szabó, 50, Hungarian Olympic short track speed skater (2002).
- Frazine Taylor, 79, American librarian and archivist.
- Malome Vector, 32, Mosotho rapper, traffic collision.
- Helen Whitwell, 68, British neuropathologist and forensic pathologist.
- Naw Zipporah Sein, 69, Burmese political activist, cancer.

=== 25 ===
- Geoff Apps, 74, Scottish bicycle manufacturer.
- Inés Ayala, 67, Spanish politician, MEP (2004–2019).
- Héctor Melesio Cuén Ojeda, 68, Mexican chemist, academic administrator, and politician, rector of the Autonomous University of Sinaloa (2005–2009), shot.
- Pascal Danel, 80, French pop singer-songwriter ("Kilimandjaro").
- Francis D'Britto, 81, Indian Roman Catholic priest, environmental activist, and writer.
- Elisabeth Drake, 87, American chemical engineer.
- Bennie Gutierrez, 88, American professional polo player.
- Martin Indyk, 73, American diplomat, ambassador to Israel (1995–1997, 2000–2001), esophageal cancer.
- Istabraq, 32, Irish Thoroughbred racehorse.
- Emmanuel Iwuanyanwu, 81, Nigerian politician and businessman, president-general of Ọhanaeze Ndigbo (since 2023).
- Sir Ken Jackson, 87, British trade unionist, general-secretary of the AEEU (1995–2001).
- Vikramabahu Karunaratne, 81, Sri Lankan politician.
- Jacques Lewis, 105, French army veteran, last known French veteran of the Normandy landings.
- Liu Changxiao, 82, Chinese pharmacologist.
- Benjamin Luxon, 87, British baritone, colon cancer.
- Rosa Magalhães, 77, Brazilian carnival designer (Imperatriz Leopoldinense).
- Herb O'Driscoll, 95, Irish-born Canadian priest.
- Kjeld Olesen, 92, Danish politician, minister of foreign affairs (1979–1982).
- Inga Peulich, 67, Australian politician, Victorian MLA (1992–2002).
- Harold Zvi Schiffrin, 101, American-born Israeli sociologist and intelligence officer (Ritchie Boys).
- Viacheslav Sereda, 73, Russian scholar of Hungarian studies.
- Patricia Shaw, 96, Australian novelist.
- Jerry Simmons, 81, American football player (Pittsburgh Steelers, Atlanta Falcons, Denver Broncos).
- Doug Smith, 64, American football player (Houston Oilers).
- Jean André Soja, 78, Malagasy politician.
- Kenneth Standring, 89, English cricketer (Lancashire).
- Albertus Swanepoel, 65, South African milliner.
- Louis van Schoor, 72, South African serial killer, complications from sepsis.
- Don Webb, 85, American football player (Boston/New England Patriots).
- Jim West, 95, American sports announcer (Chicago Blackhawks, Chicago Cubs, Baltimore Clippers), heart failure.
- Cynthia Griffin Wolff, 87, American literary historian (Emily Dickinson).

=== 26 ===
- Janet Andrewartha, 72, Australian actress (Neighbours, Prisoner, Embassy), cancer.
- Christiane Baroche, 89, French novelist and short story writer.
- Linda Bent, 86, American actress (Bikini Beach).
- José Francisco Borges, 88, Brazilian folk poet and wood engraver.
- Michael Chen Wing Sum, 92, Malaysian politician, minister of housing (1974–1979) and MP (1964–1969, 1972–1982).
- Frank Chiarelli, 92, Canadian ice hockey player (Rensselaer Polytechnic Institute).
- Kelly Nelon Clark, 64, American gospel singer (The Nelons), plane crash.
- Robert Cloer, 93, American politician, member of the Georgia House of Representatives (1961–1963).
- John Conomos, 77, Australian artist.
- Michael Copass, 86, American physician.
- George B. Crist, 93, American Marine Corps general, commander-in-chief of the U.S. Central Command (1985–1988).
- Frits Goldschmeding, 90, Dutch businessman and billionaire, founder of Randstad NV.
- Charles Hewett, 95, American Olympic cyclist (1960).
- Prabhat Jha, 67, Indian politician, MP (2008–2020).
- Charles Juliet, 89, French poet, playwright, and novelist.
- Geir Karlsen, 75, Norwegian footballer (Odd, Rosenborg, national team), cancer.
- Tom C. Korologos, 91, American diplomat, ambassador to Belgium (2004–2007).
- James J. Lovelace, 75, American lieutenant general.
- Master Mathan, 91, Indian politician, MP (1998–2004).
- Maria New, 95, American geneticist.
- Suzanne Opton, 79, American photographer.
- John Rickard, 89, Australian historian.
- Charles Royer, 84, American politician, mayor of Seattle (1978–1990).
- Firudin Safarov, 90, Azerbaijani theatre director.
- Sefton Samuels, 93, British photographer.
- Siti Zaharah Sulaiman, 75, Malaysian politician, deputy minister of health (1995–1996) and MP (1985–2008).
- Waddell Smith, 70, American football player (Edmonton Eskimos, Dallas Cowboys).
- Erwin Stein, 89, German footballer (Eintracht Frankfurt, Darmstadt 98, West Germany national team).
- Stanley G. Tate, 96, American real estate developer.
- Ifeanyi Ubah, 52, Nigerian politician, senator (since 2019).
- Arvo Valton, 88, Estonian writer.
- Pepe Luis Vázquez Silva, 68, Spanish bullfighter.
- Alfred Zierler, 91, Austrian medallist and engraver.

=== 27 ===
- Carlos Alvarado, 96, Costa Rican footballer (América de Cali, América, national team).
- Georges Berthoin, 99, French politician and diplomat, chief of staff to Jean Monnet (1952–1955).
- Peter Bradshaw, 88, British aeronautical engineer.
- Jean Baptiste Bùi Tuần, 96, Vietnamese Roman Catholic prelate, coadjutor bishop (1975–1997) and bishop (1997–2003) of Long Xuyên.
- James Caldwell, 81, Northern Irish mathematician.
- Francis Chouat, 75, French historian and politician, MP (2018–2022) and mayor of Évry (2012–2018).
- Biswanath Chowdhury, 81, Indian politician, West Bengal MLA (1977–2011, 2016–2021), cancer.
- Murray Costello, 90, Canadian ice hockey player (Boston Bruins, Detroit Red Wings, Chicago Blackhawks) and executive.
- Jeanne Cressanges, 95, French essayist, novelist, and screenwriter.
- Gary Dotter, 81, American baseball player (Minnesota Twins), complications from Parkinson's disease.
- Luis Galarza, 73, Bolivian football player (The Strongest, national team) and manager (Always Ready).
- Mariano Haro, 84, Spanish Olympic athlete (1968, 1972, 1976).
- Kazuya Hiraide, 45, Japanese alpinist, alpine fall.
- Oldřich Janota, 74, Czech singer-songwriter.
- Don Marinko Jr., 91, Australian rules footballer (Western Australia).
- Mísia, 69, Portuguese fado singer, cancer.
- Peter Morgan, 65, Welsh rugby player (Llanelli, national team, British & Irish Lions), brain tumour.
- Kenro Nakajima, 39, Japanese alpinist, alpine fall.
- Edna O'Brien, 93, Irish novelist (The Country Girls, August Is a Wicked Month, Casualties of Peace).
- Vladimir Petrov, 66, American professional wrestler (Jim Crockett Promotions, UWF, WWF).
- Phyllis Preuss, 85, American amateur golfer.
- Wolfgang Rihm, 72, German composer (Jakob Lenz, Die Hamletmaschine, Dionysos), cancer.
- Pete Sanchez, 81, American professional wrestler (WWF, Stampede, CSW).
- James L. Seward, 72, American politician, member of the New York State Senate (1987–2020), cancer.
- Margaret Patrice Slattery, 98, American academic administrator and religious sister.

=== 28 ===
- John Anderson, 92, Scottish athletics coach and television personality (Gladiators).
- Erica Ash, 46, American actress (Mad TV, The Big Gay Sketch Show, Survivor's Remorse), breast cancer.
- David Earle Bailey, 84, American Episcopal priest.
- David Biale, 75, American historian, prostate cancer.
- Chino XL, 50, American rapper ("Kreep") and actor (Alex & Emma), suicide.
- Doug Creek, 55, American baseball player (St. Louis Cardinals, San Francisco Giants, Tampa Bay Devil Rays), pancreatic cancer.
- Christopher D. M. Fletcher, 66, British pathologist.
- Nail Galimov, 58, Russian football player (FK Khujand, FC Lokomotiv Chita, Luch) and coach.
- Tynes Hildebrand, 93, American college basketball coach (Northwestern State).
- Vladimir Khodyrev, 94, Russian politician, chairman of the Lensovet (1983–1990).
- Armando Larrea, 81, Ecuadorian footballer (L.D.U. Quito, Universidad Católica, national team).
- Gene McArtor, 83, American baseball coach (Missouri Tigers).
- Prince Michael of Greece and Denmark, 85, Greek royal, historian and author.
- Reyes Moronta, 31, Dominican baseball player (San Francisco Giants, Los Angeles Dodgers, Los Angeles Angels), traffic collision.
- Jim Newbigin, 92, New Zealand cricketer (Wellington).
- Francine Pascal, 92, American author (Sweet Valley High), lymphoma.
- Martin Phillipps, 61, New Zealand singer-songwriter ("Pink Frost", "Kaleidoscope World") and guitarist (The Chills).
- Alma Powell, 86, American audiologist.
- Peter Reddaway, 84, British-American political scientist.
- Mick Underwood, 78, English drummer (Quatermass, Strapps, Gillan).

=== 29 ===
- Arif Aqueel, 72, Indian politician, Madhya Pradesh MLA (1990–2023).
- Robert Banas, 90, American dancer and actor (West Side Story), pneumonia.
- Paco Camino, 83, Spanish bullfighter and bull breeder.
- Pauline Atherton Cochrane, 94, American librarian.
- Snehlata Deshmukh, 85, Indian academic administrator, vice chancellor of University of Mumbai (1995–2000).
- Robert Fellowes, Baron Fellowes, 82, British courtier, private secretary to the sovereign (1990–1999) and member of the House of Lords (1999–2022).
- Benjamin Gay, 44, American football player (Cleveland Browns), traffic collision.
- Joey Gilmore, 80, American singer, songwriter and guitarist.
- Hans-Jürgen Krupp, 91, German politician, economist, and academic, president of Goethe University Frankfurt (1975–1979).
- Floyd Layne, 94, American basketball player (Scranton Miners, Hazleton Hawks) and coach (CCNY).
- Annie Le Brun, 81, French writer and poet.
- Robert Moreland, 85, American college basketball coach (Texas Southern Tigers).
- Christopher Penfold, 83, British scriptwriter (Space: 1999) and editor.
- Rhondi A. Vilott Salsitz, 74, American author, lung cancer.
- Yuri Sergeev, 99, Russian Olympic speed skater (1956).
- Józef Szmidt, 89, Polish triple jumper, Olympic champion (1960, 1964), cancer.
- Antonio Vera Ramírez, 90, Spanish author.
- Paul Graham Wilson, 96, Australian botanist.

=== 30 ===
- Ann J. Abadie, 84, American scholar and literary editor.
- Adolphe Alésina, 81, French rugby league player (Carcassonne, national team).
- Asiah Aman, 94, Singaporean singer and actress (Chinta).
- Junro Anan, 86, Japanese baseball player (Hiroshima Toyo Carp, Osaka Kintetsu Buffaloes).
- Eddie Canales, 76, American human rights activist, pancreatic cancer.
- Tommy Clish, 91, English footballer (Darlington).
- Vladimir Eshinov, 75, Russian rower, Olympic champion (1976).
- Bruno Garzena, 91, Italian footballer (Juventus, Napoli, national team).
- Haukur Halldórsson, 87, Icelandic artist.
- Alan Cooke Kay, 92, American jurist, judge (since 1986) and chief judge (1991–1999) of the U.S. District Court for Hawaii (since 1986).
- Kevin Laidlaw, 89, New Zealand rugby union player (Southland, national team) and coach (Southland).
- Hans Lenk, 89, German rower, Olympic champion (1960).
- Jenny Mastoraki, 75, Greek poet and translator.
- Roy Mottahedeh, 84, American historian.
- Onyeka Onwenu, 72, Nigerian singer, actress (Women's Cot, Rising Moon, Half of a Yellow Sun), and human rights activist.
- Hans Pappa, 88, Swiss Olympic ice hockey player (1956).
- Betty A. Prashker, 99, American publishing executive and editor.
- Fuad Shukr, 62, Lebanese Islamic militant, senior member of Hezbollah, airstrike.
- Lyle Stewart, 73, Canadian politician, Saskatchewan MLA (1999–2023), cancer.
- Carlos Tello Macías, 85, Mexican economist, academic, and diplomat.
- Malham Wakin, 93, American military officer and educator (United States Air Force Academy).
- Lisa Westcott, 76, British make-up artist (Les Misérables, Mrs Brown, Shakespeare in Love), Oscar winner (2013).
- Peter Wyder, 90, Swiss physicist.

=== 31 ===
- Manfred Bierwisch, 94, German linguist.
- Waraire Boswell, 48, American fashion designer.
- Bruce Brodie, 87, South African cricketer.
- Paul Bucha, 80, American army officer and political advisor, Medal of Honor recipient.
- Jim Crawley, 90, American football coach (Frostburg State Bobcats).
- Raymond Desfossés, 73, Canadian gangster (West End Gang).
- DJ Randall, 54, British DJ and record producer.
- Peter Dykstra, 67, American environmental activist and journalist, complications from pneumonia.
- Genco Erkal, 86, Turkish actor (A Season in Hakkari, The Market: A Tale of Trade, Sleeping Princess), leukemia.
- Anshuman Gaekwad, 71, Indian cricket player (national team) and coach, blood cancer.
- Krum Georgiev, 66, Bulgarian chess grandmaster.
- Ismail al-Ghoul, 27, Palestinian journalist (Al Jazeera Arabic), airstrike.
- Ismail Haniyeh, 62, Palestinian politician, prime minister (2006–2014), Hamas chief in the Gaza Strip (2014–2017), and chairman of the Hamas political bureau (since 2017), explosion.
- Hans Heinemann, 83, Swiss Olympic cyclist (1960, 1964).
- Roberto Herlitzka, 86, Italian actor (Morel's Invention, Seven Beauties, Summer Night).
- Constantin Ionescu, 65, Romanian chess grandmaster.
- André Juillard, 76, French comic book artist (Blake and Mortimer).
- Sir Colin Maiden, 91, New Zealand mechanical engineer and university administrator, vice-chancellor of the University of Auckland (1971–1994).
- Arthur Miles, 74, American R&B and jazz musician.
- Mokhtar Nourafshan, 57, Iranian athlete, four-time Paralympic champion, kidney disease.
- Duane Pasco, 92, American artist.
- Carmen Pateña, 83, Filipino singer.
- Giuseppe Sciortino, 74, Italian-born Canadian lawyer and political activist.
- Mary Ann Smith, 77, American politician, member of the Chicago City Council (1989–2011).
- Song Giwon, 77, South Korean novelist, stroke.
- Diana Phipps Sternberg, 88, Czech-Austrian aristocrat and humanitarian.
- Howard J. Van Till, 85, American physicist and professor.
- Hideo Watanabe, 90, Japanese politician, member of the House of Councillors (1998–2010).
- Taral Wayne, 72, Canadian artist.
- Vernice Wineera, 85, New Zealand-American poet.
