= Karten =

Karten may refer to:

- Harvey Karten (1935–2024), American neuroscientist
- Kompass Karten, an Austrian map publisher based in Innsbruck
