= IJSP =

IJSP may refer to:

- International Journal of Social Psychiatry, medical journal on social psychiatry
- International Journal of Surgical Pathology, medical journal on pathology
