= Christopher D. M. Fletcher =

British pathologist (1958–2024)

- Born: 13 March 1958
- Died: 28 July 2024 (aged 66)

Christopher D. M. Fletcher (13 March 1958 – 28 July 2024) was a British pathologist who wrote more than 700 peer reviewed articles and was a chairman of the World Health Organization's Working Group on the Pathology and Genetics of Tumours of Soft Tissue and Bone. He graduated from London's St. Thomas's Hospital Medical School and got his M.D. degree from the University of London in 1991. Later on, he became a postdoc at the Royal College of Pathologists, from which he also graduated in 1988. He was trained at St Thomas' Hospital and was president of the Association of Directors of Anatomic and Surgical Pathology from 2003 to 2006. He was a Professor of Pathology at Harvard Medical School, president of both the Arthur Purdy Stout Society and the International Society of Bone & Soft Tissue Pathology and was also a surgical pathologist at the Brigham and Women's Hospital. He also worked for the Dana–Farber Cancer Institute in Boston, Massachusetts as chief of onco-pathology.

Fletcher was the recipient of a number of awards:

- Oswald Vander Veken Prize (European Community prize for research into musculoskeletal tumors - 1990)
- Young Investigator Award, United States-Canadian Academy of Pathology (1997)
- Henry L. Jaffe Award, Hospital for Joint Diseases, New York (1998)
- Honorary Fellow, College of American Pathologists (2003)
- Fred W. Stewart Medal, Memorial Sloan Kettering Cancer Center (2005)
- Maude Abbott Lecturer, United States-Canadian Academy of Pathology (2008)
- Distinguished Pathologist Award, United States-Canadian Academy of Pathology (2017)
- The F.K. Mostofi Distinguished Service Award (2020)

== Selected publications ==
- Christopher D M Fletcher; Jules J Berman; Christopher Corless; et al. (2002). "Diagnosis of gastrointestinal stromal tumors: a consensus approach". International Journal of Surgical Pathology. 10 (2): 81–89. doi:10.1177/106689690201000201. PMID 12075401. Wikidata Q34697685.
- George D Demetri; Margaret von Mehren; Charles D Blanke; et al. (2002). "Efficacy and safety of imatinib mesylate in advanced gastrointestinal stromal tumors". The New England Journal of Medicine. 347 (7): 472–480. doi:10.1056/nejmoa020461. PMID 12181401. Wikidata Q29618610.
- Christopher D. M. Fletcher (2013). "The evolving classification of soft tissue tumours - an update based on the new 2013 WHO classification". Histopathology. 64 (1): 2–11. doi:10.1111/his.12267. PMID 24164390. Wikidata Q38155908.
