= Rameau Poleon =

Saint Lucian musician (1929–2024)

Joseph "Rameau" Poleon (10 July 1929 – 22 July 2024), also known as Papa Kilte, was a St. Lucian folk fiddler born in Vieux Fort. He has won the Best Violinist Competition in Saint Lucia twice, and was recipient of the Saint Lucia Medal of Merit (Silver) from the Governor General of Saint Lucia in 2000.

Encouraged by his father, Rameau Poleon began playing violin when he was 15 years old under the guidance of his uncle, Flood Polean. Following public and critical acclaim, he joined the Mount Gallion Folk Group directed by Eric Adley, lead singer and drummer. He has appeared at Caribbean festivals and toured widely in Europe and North America. His music is strongly influenced by the moulala and la comette, based on the French minuet, as well as the gwan rond (grande ronde), lakonmèt (mazurka), faci, and other indigenous Creole folk sounds of Saint Lucia.

He has been recorded by Smithsonian Folkways's Folkways Records label on the album Musical Traditions of St. Lucia, West Indies: Dances and Songs from a Caribbean Island, where he appears as lead fiddler on a kwadril suite of five dance tunes with the Kwadril Ensemble.

Poleon died on 22 July 2024, at the age of 95.

== Source ==
- Folk Research Center, Saint Lucia, Joseph 'Rameau' Poleon – Papa Kilte
- St. Lucia One Stop, Sounds of St. Lucia
