= Waraire Boswell =

American fashion designer (1975–2024)

- Born: September 29, 1975; Altadena, California, U.S.
- Died: July 31, 2024 (aged 48)
- Education: Cal State Northridge
- Labels: Waraire Boswell; Waraire; Boswell
- Spouse: Monica
- Children: 2
- Awards: Mercedes Benz Classic Designer of the Year; GenArt Fresh Face
- Website: waraireboswell.com

Waraire Boswell (September 29, 1975 – July 31, 2024) was an American fashion designer and businessman. He launched his namesake label in 2003, specializing in bespoke suiting and ready-to-wear. In 2005, Boswell was named Mercedes Benz Classic Designer of the Year.

== Early life and education ==
Boswell was born in Altadena, California, on September 29, 1975. He attended John Muir High School and graduated in 1993. Thereafter, Boswell attended Cal State Northridge and majored in Radio/Television film.

== Career ==
Boswell's early career included working as an agent-trainee at William Morris Endeavor and United Talent Agency. He started designing suits for himself after having trouble finding clothing to fit his six-foot seven stature. In 2003, he founded his namesake label with his sister, Dr. Kasmin Boswell, and began offering custom suiting to professional athletes, talent agents, industry associates and celebrity clientele. The next year, Boswell's designs were featured in GenArt's "Fresh Faces in Fashion" show in Los Angeles, California. In March 2005, he showcased an accessories collection at the "Pret a PSP" show for the release of the PlayStation Portable. The same year, he was named Mercedes Benz Classic Designer of the Year.

In April 2014, Boswell co-launched a ready-to-wear line with Jace Lipstein. In 2017, he partnered with McDonald's to design a contemporary collection of employee uniforms. Boswell also collaborated with 1800 Tequila and Uproxx for their "Refined From The Raw" campaign. He designed a three-piece "suit" made from a fabric initially purposed for space program parachutes.

Boswell's work has been featured in trade magazines such as Vogue, GQ, Esquire and Vanity Fair. In February 2019, he was noted by Women's Wear Daily as a member of the Black Design Collective. he was married and had 2 children

== Death ==
Boswell died on July 31, 2024, at the age of 48.
