= Dudley Eustace =

British businessman (1936–2024)

Dudley Graham Eustace (3 July 1936 – 11 July 2024) was a British businessman specialized in financial restructuring who held many executive functions in Dutch companies.

He was vice-president and CFO of Philips where he was second-in-command to CEO Cor Boonstra. He resigned in 1999. In November 1999, he was appointed chairman of the board of Smith & Nephew. He was named interim chief financial officer of Ahold in 2003 to restructure finances after the company's $880m fraud scandal.

Eustace joined the supervisory board of Aegon in 1997, eventually becoming Chairman of the board until his 2010 resignation. He sat at the board of VNU, now called The Nielsen Company, from 2006 to 2009. He was also Vice-Chairman of the Supervisory Board of KPN, Vice-Chairman of Hagemeyer and was a member of the Supervisory Board of Stork N.V.

Eustace died on 11 July 2024, at the age of 88.
