= María Paz Troncoso =

Chilean public administrator (1975–2024)

Maria Paz Troncoso
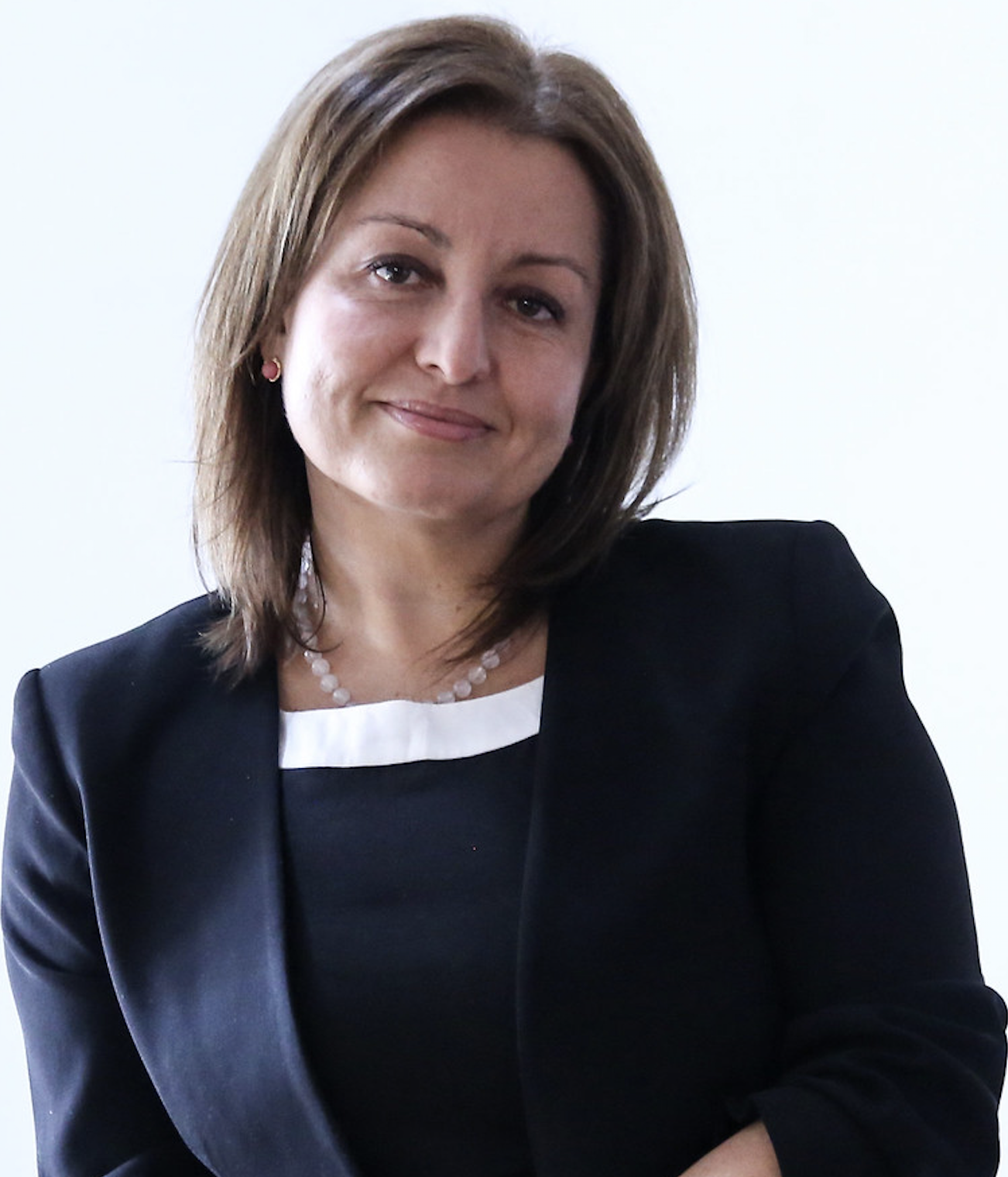
- Paz Troncoso in 2021

Undersecretary of Regional and Administrative Development of Chile
- In office November 20, 2020 – March 11, 2022
- President: Sebastián Piñera
- Succeeded by: Miguel Crispi Serrano

Personal details
- Born: December 1, 1975; Chile
- Died: July 23, 2024 (aged 48); Chile
- Education: University of Chile; University for Development
- Occupation: Public administrator and politician

María Paz Troncoso Pulgar (December 1, 1975 – July 23, 2024) was a Chilean public administrator and politician. From November 2020 to March 2022, she served as the Undersecretariat of Regional and Administrative Development under the second government of Sebastián Piñera.

== Biography ==
A graduate of the University of Chile and the Universidad del Desarrollo, Paz Troncoso was the director of the Communal Planning Secretariat of the Municipality of Santiago from 2009 until 2012. She also served in the same role at La Florida between 2004 and 2008, Lo Barnechea between 2015 and 2016, and in the Municipality of La Reina from 2016 to 2018.

Under the first government of Sebastián Piñera, Paz Troncoso worked as an advisor to Miguel Flores. On November 20, 2020, after the resignation of Juan Manuel Masferrer, President Sebastián Piñera appointed her to assume the position of Undersecretary of Regional and Administrative Development, being the third woman and the first without political affiliation in the position. Paz Troncoso died on July 23, 2024, at the age of 48.
