= Elisabeth Drake =

American chemical engineer

Elisabeth Mertz Drake (December 20, 1936 – July 25, 2024) was an American chemical engineer whose work spanned a wide range of topics, including cryogenics, industrial risk management, destruction of chemical weapons, and sustainable energy. Much of her career was spent at the Arthur D. Little company and the Massachusetts Institute of Technology.

== Early life and education ==
Drake was born on December 20, 1936, in New York City, and grew up in Mount Vernon, New York as the only child of a lawyer and a schoolteacher, John and Ruth Mertz. She applied to the Massachusetts Institute of Technology (MIT), in defiance of a high school mathematics teacher who told her that, despite being the best student in the class, she "shouldn't even think about it". She was accepted, and majored in chemical engineering at MIT, at a time when MIT had only 17 female students in her entering class, and later only nine. Among her friends there was Vilma Espín, who left school to become a Cuban revolutionary and later first lady of Cuba. She married Alvin W. Drake, also an MIT student, between her junior and senior years, graduated in 1958, and later the same year had a baby who died young from severe birth defects. A second pregnancy ended in a miscarriage. After six years in industry, she returned to MIT for doctoral study, at the same time as her husband returned from a military stint in New Jersey to become an electrical engineering professor at MIT. She completed her Ph.D. in 1966.

== Career and later life ==
She worked for the Arthur D. Little company, initially as a summer job when she was an undergraduate, and then on a permanent basis after her undergraduate degree. An early experience there cleaning glassware from experiments on tobacco tar broke a smoking habit that she had picked up at MIT. Other early work for the company focused on cryogenics, with applications in the Apollo program for lunar exploration and on Earth in the production of liquefied natural gas, and for generation of oxygen on ships for aircraft carrier pilots. Her focus on risk management for industrial facilities began there in the 1970s, and she became a vice president for technological risk management at Arthur D. Little. In around 1974, she worked as a visiting professor at MIT, but declined an offer of a more permanent faculty position.

In 1982, she returned to academia, as the Cabot Professor of Chemical Engineering at Northwestern University, where she chaired the department of chemical engineering. Her marriage disintegrated at around this time, and a descent into alcoholism lost her this job, and, after a return to Arthur D. Little in 1986, her job there as well. After a brief period as an independent consultant, she came back to MIT in 1990 as associate director of the MIT Energy Laboratory. She continued as associate director until 2000. In this period, "intrigued by the connections between excessive energy use and environmental problems", she began teaching and working on issues of sustainable energy.

She retired in 2001, and died on July 25, 2024.

== Recognition ==
Drake became a Fellow of the American Institute of Chemical Engineers (AIChE) in the 1980s, as the second female fellow after Patsy Stallings Chappelear. She recalled that "the plaque statements had only male-specific terminology", and after corrections were made to the wording she received a second plaque commemorating her fellowship. She was elected to the National Academy of Engineering in 1992, "for leadership in industrial safety and risk management".
