= E. Jennifer Ashworth =

Canadian philosopher (1939–2024)

- Born: 1939; United Kingdom
- Died: 23 July 2024 (aged 84–85); Swansea, Wales, United Kingdom
- Education: Cambridge University, Bryn Mawr College (PhD)
- Awards: Killam Research Fellowship

Earline Jennifer Ashworth (1939 – 23 July 2024) was a Canadian philosopher and Distinguished Professor Emerita of Philosophy at the University of Waterloo. She is known for her works on medieval philosophy. Ashworth was a Fellow of the Royal Society of Canada and a member of the British Academy Medieval Texts Editorial Committee. She died on 23 July 2024, after suffering a stroke.

== Books ==
- Language and Logic in the Post-Medieval Period (Dordrecht: Reidel, 1974)
- The Tradition of Medieval Logic and Speculative Grammar from Anselm to the End of the Seventeenth Century: A Bibliography from 1836 Onwards (Toronto: PIMS, 1978)
- Studies in Post-Medieval Semantics (London: Variorum, 1985)
- edition of Robert Sanderson: Logicae Artis Compendium (Bologna: CLUEB, 1985)
- edition of Thomas Bricot: Tractatus Insolubilium (Nijmegen: Ingenium, 1986)
- edition and translation of Paul of Venice: Logica Magna Part II, Fascicule 8 (Oxford University Press, 1988)
- Les théories de l’analogie du XIIe au XVIe siècle (Paris: Vrin, 2008)
