= Arnold Band =

American professor of Hebrew and comparative literature (1929–2024)

Arnold J. Band
- Born: 1929; Dorchester, Massachusetts, U.S.
- Died: 2024 (aged 94–95)
- Occupations: Professor of Hebrew and Comparative Literature
- Employer(s): University of California, Los Angeles

Academic background
- Education: Harvard University (BA in Classics; PhD in Comparative Literature)

Academic work
- Discipline: Jewish studies; comparative literature

Arnold J. Band (1929–2024) was a professor of Hebrew and comparative literature at UCLA for over 50 years, and was considered a major figure in the field of Jewish studies.

== Early life and education ==
Band was born in Dorchester, Massachusetts. He earned his BA in Classics and his PhD in Comparative Literature at Harvard.

== Career ==
Band helped create UCLA's Department of Near Eastern Literature, Judaic Studies Program, and Comparative Literature Program, and had an impact on the overall discipline of Jewish studies at the university level. He is known for his study of Nahman of Bratslav.

He was a member of the board of the Jewish Quarterly Review, and had a particular interest in Shmuel Yosef Agnon.

In a 1966 article published in the American Jewish Year Book, Band was among the first to call attention to the "spread of Jewish studies as an accepted academic discipline in the American liberal arts colleges and universities since the Second World War". He offered a definition of Jewish (Judaic) studies as "the discipline which deals with the historical experiences, in the intellectual, religious, and social spheres, of the Jewish people in all centuries and countries".

Band was awarded the Distinguished Teaching Award by UCLA in 1981. He received a National Endowment for the Humanities Fellowship and a Guggenheim Fellowship. He was director of UCLA's Jewish Studies Center from 1994 to 1996. He also played a role in establishing the Association for Jewish Studies.

== Publications ==
- Arnold J. Band (1968-01-01). Nostalgia and Nightmare: A study in the fiction of S. Y. Agnon. Internet Archive. University of California Press.
- Band, Arthur (1978). Nahman of Bratslav: The Tales. Paulist Press. ISBN 978-0-8091-2103-8.
