= Thierry Chopin =

Canadian phycologist (died 2024)

- Born: 15 May 1959; Villefranche-sur-Saone, France
- Died: 18 July 2024 (aged 65)
- Citizenship: French, Swiss, Canadian
- Education: University of Western Brittany
- Scientific career
- Fields: Aquaculture; Phycology
- Workplaces: University of New Brunswick
- Thesis: Variations saisonnières de la nutrition phosphorée, des carraghénanes et de la croissance chez deux formes de l’algue rouge Chondrus crispus Stackhouse (1985)
- Website: www2.unb.ca/chopinlab/

Thierry B.R. Chopin (died 18 July 2024) was a Canadian phycologist and professor of aquaculture at the University of New Brunswick, Saint John. He died on 18 July 2024.

== Awards and honours ==
- Chevalier of the Ordre du Mérite Maritime
- Chevalier of the Ordre des Palmes académiques
- Honorary Consul of France
