= Hetty Verolme =

Australian Holocaust survivor and writer (1930–2024)

Hetty Esther Verolme (24 February 1930 – 9 July 2024) was an Australian writer, educator, and Holocaust survivor. She wrote about her experiences as a child in Bergen-Belsen, and was a founding trustee of Children of Belsen and the Holocaust Trust.

== Early life and family ==
Hetty Esther Verolme was born on 24 February 1930 in Antwerp, Belgium.

In 1931 the Werkendam family moved to Amsterdam from Antwerp. Eight years later, World War II broke out and in May 1940 the Germans occupied the Netherlands.

=== World War II ===
In 1943, when Verolme was 12 years old, the Werkendam family was transported first to the Westerbork camp for a short stay, then to the Bergen-Belsen concentration camp. At Bergen-Belsen, Verolme and her brothers, Max and Jack, were sent to Barrack 211, also known as the Children's House.

Sister Luba, a Polish prisoner, saved the children and took full responsibility for the group. Due to Verolme's age, she was tasked with supervising the small children there. She became known as "Little Mother".

Food and water was very limited and the conditions of the barracks were poor. Hetty relied on other children who were older for support and good spirits amongst the growing number of children. Sister Luba had other ladies to help her protect the children; however, many died. Their bodies were piled up on a mound right outside the Children's house.

When World War II was in its last months, the camp experienced a typhus epidemic. Verolme fell sick, but survived. In April 1945, the British Army liberated Bergen-Belsen.

=== Family and friends ===
On Friday 2 October 1942 at 8:15 am, Verolme's grandmother, grandfather and cousin were taken away and killed. Verolme's school boyfriend and her school friend Sonia Santiel both were murdered in Auschwitz on 22 October in 1943. Later, two of her uncles, Philip Van Kamerik and Max Werkendam (b. 1917), were murdered in Bergen-Belsen.

Verolme lost over 110 Werkendam family members during the Holocaust, in many work and death camps.

== Career ==
After the war, Verolme and her brothers were reunited with their parents. With assistance from the Red Cross organisation, the family moved back to the Netherlands. As an adult, Verolme built a successful career in the fashion industry.

In 1954, Verolme emigrated to Australia. Once there, she worked as a waitress, bus conductor, door-to-door sales person, real estate agent, and a shopping centre developer. From 1964 she was director and then in 1974 managing director at Unita Investments. At the same time she worked for a shopping centre development business until 1984, and ran her own business, H.E. Verolme Estate Pty. Ltd. (1972–1985). She then ran Ibsag Prestige Realty from 1986 to 2006.

== Other activities ==
Verolme has written about her experiences as a child in Bergen-Belsen, in two published works (2000 and 2010).

She became the first female president of the Netherlands Society of South Australia in Adelaide, and was on charity committees such as the Lady Mayoress's Committees, and later worked with the Ethnic Affairs Council.

She was a founding trustee of Children of Belsen and the Holocaust Trust, formed to help holocaust survivors, their descendants and promote the continued awareness of the Holocaust.

== Later life and death ==
In 2014, aged 84, Verolme was one of only eight Holocaust survivors living in Western Australia.

Verolme died on 9 July 2024, aged 94.

== Recognition and awards ==
Verolme is listed in the Who's Who of Australian Women.

She has been recognised in various ways:

- 1972 - Awarded "Most Successful Migrant" by the Department of Immigration
- 1977 - Appointed to the inaugural Australian Ethnic Affairs Council
- 2000 - FAW Christina Stead Award - Fellowship of Australian Writers

== Published works ==
Verolme's two books have been published in Australia, The Netherlands, Germany, Italy, Spain, France, and the UK.

- Verolme, Hetty (2013) [2000]. The Children's House of Belsen. WERMA Pty. Ltd. atf. "The Children of Belsen Trust". ISBN 9780992297329.
- Verolme, Hetty (2010). Hetty: A True Story. ReadHowYouWant.com. ISBN 978-1458718808.
