= Kea Homan =

Dutch painter (1939–2024)

- Born: Kea Martha Homan; 17 May 1939; Assen, Netherlands
- Died: 17 July 2024 (aged 85); Assen, Netherlands
- Known for: Painter, graphic artist

Kea Martha Homan (17 May 1939 – 17 July 2024) was a Dutch painter and graphic artist.

== Life and work ==
Homan was taught by painter Bart Pots at the Rijks Hogere Burgerschool in Assen. She continued her education at the Academie Minerva in the city of Groningen, where she was a pupil of Nico Bulder (graphic techniques), Evert Musch (painting), and Willem Valk (modeling). Graduating in 1961, she became a drawing teacher at household schools in Steenwijk, Dokkum, and Tolbert. Until 1992, she taught at a mavo in Rolde, where she was a teacher at the school of the family's primary school.

As an artist, Homan initially concentrated on painting, drawing, etching, and lithography, but shifted her focus to making woodcuts. She joined the Het Drents Schildersgenootschap, which, with the help of the Carnation Fund, enabled her to make study tours. Retrospective exhibitions of her work were held at the Drents Museum (1986) and at Pictura (1997) in Groningen, among other places.

Homan was a member of the Drenthe Assessment Committee for the Visual Artists Scheme, and served on the Assen City Council for the Dutch Labour Party from 1973 to 1976.

Homan died in Assen on 17 July 2024, at the age of 85.

== Bibliography ==
- Kea Homan (1981) Hout onder druk: prenten van Kea Homan : een keuze uit de houtsneden gemaakt in de periode 1960-1981.
- Kea Homan and Harry Tupan (2012) Kea Homan : Uit het goede hout gesneden. Wezep: De Kunst. ISBN 978-94-91196-13-3.
