= William T. Shea =

American politician (1930–2024)

Member of the Connecticut House of Representatives
- In office 1959–1967

Personal details
- Born: July 2, 1930 Springfield, Massachusetts, U.S.
- Died: July 12, 2024 (aged 94)
- Party: Democratic
- Education: Wharton School of Finance and Commerce; University of Pennsylvania Law School

William T. Shea (July 2, 1930 – July 12, 2024) was an American politician. He served as a Democratic member of the Connecticut House of Representatives.

== Life and career ==
Shea was born in Springfield, Massachusetts. He attended the Wharton School of Finance and Commerce and the University of Pennsylvania Law School.

Shea served in the Connecticut House of Representatives from 1959 to 1967.

Shea died on July 12, 2024, at the age of 94.
