= Christiane Baroche =

French writer (1935–2024)

Christiane Baroche (20 January 1935 – 26 July 2024) was a French novelist and short story writer.

Baroche graduated with a BS in 1954. After a scientific career, at the Curie Institute (Paris) she turned to writing. Baroche died on 26 July 2024, at the age of 89.

== Awards ==
- 1978 Prix Goncourt de la Nouvelle, Chambres, avec vue sur le passé
- 1994 Grand Prix SGDL de la Nouvelle

== Works ==
- Les Feux du large, nouvelles, Gallimard, 1975
- Chambres, avec vue sur le passé, nouvelles, Gallimard, 1978
- L’Ecorce indéchiffrable, poèmes, collection SUD, 1979
- Pas d’autres intempéries que la solitude, nouvelles, Gallimard, 1980
- Perdre le souffle, nouvelles, Gallimard, 1983
- Un soir, j’inventerai le soir, nouvelles, Actes Sud, 1983
- L'Hiver de Beauté (Gallimard, 1987). Sequel of Les Liaisons dangereuses
- Et il ventait devant ma porte: nouvelles, Gallimard, 1989
- Les Ports du silence (Grasset, 1992)
- La Rage au bois dormant (Grasset, 1995)
- Les petits bonheurs d'Héloïse (Grasset, 1997).
- Ailleurs sous un ciel pâle, Le Castor astral, 1997, ISBN 978-2-85920-311-5
- Attention chaud devant: nouvelles, Transbordeurs, 2007, ISBN 978-2-84957-085-2
