= Antonio Michele Coppi =

Italian politician (1948–2024)

Member of the Senate
- In office 27 April 1992 – 14 April 1994

Personal details
- Born: 21 October 1948 Turi, Apulia, Italy
- Died: 5 July 2024 (aged 75)
- Party: Italian Democratic Socialist Party
- Profession: Politician

Antonio Michele Coppi (21 October 1948 – 5 July 2024) was an Italian politician who served as Senator for one legislature (1992–1994).

Coppi died on 5 July 2024, at the age of 75.
