= Stanley G. Tate =

American real estate developer (1928–2024)

- Born: April 25, 1928
- Died: July 26, 2024 (aged 96)
- Burial place: Lakeside Memorial Park, Doral, Florida, U.S.
- Education: B.S. University of Florida
- Spouse: Joanne Greenwood
- Children: Three

Stanley G. Tate (April 25, 1928 – July 26, 2024) was an American real estate developer, founder of Tate Enterprises, Republican party donor, and the creator of the Florida Prepaid College Tuition Program.

== Biography ==
In 1954, he founded Stanley Tate Builders Inc which focused on building houses and apartment buildings; and in 1959, expanded into constructing strip malls, warehouses, and office buildings. In 1969, he established Highpoint of Delray Builders Inc which focused on condominiums. In 1960, he established Investments Diversifed Limited which expanded into real estate activities in South Carolina and non-real estate investments.

Tate had been a Republican since the 1950s and was a personal friend of President George H. W. Bush who named him as Chairman of the National Advisory Board of the Resolution Trust Corporation (RTC), the agency that managed and liquidated banks’ assets during the S&L crisis. Tate was highly critical of President Barack Obama - who vetted him as a possible candidate to lead the Federal Deposit Insurance Corporation.

On June 26, 2006, then Governor Jeb Bush signed House Bill 263 into law renaming the program the Stanley G. Tate Florida Prepaid College Program.

Tate served as president of Temple Israel, the oldest reform synagogue in Miami.

=== Personal life and death ===
In 1949, Tate married Joanne "Joni" Greenwood; they had a daughter and two sons. Tate's sons now run the company. He was of Jewish descent and at the time of his death was the last remaining founding member of AIPAC.

Stanley G. Tate died on July 26, 2024, at the age of 96.
