= Dagoberto Gutiérrez =

Salvadoran politician (1944–2024)

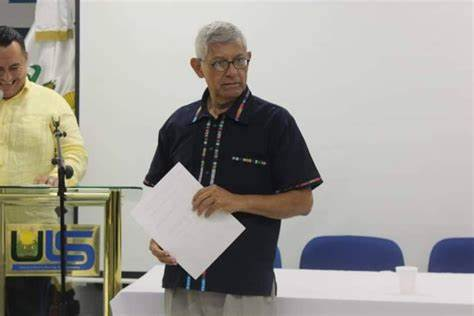
Gutiérrez in 2019

José Dagoberto Gutiérrez Linares (December 12, 1944 – July 9, 2024) was a Salvadoran politician, political analyst, and Farabundo Martí National Liberation Front (FMLN) guerrilla fighter during the Salvadoran Civil War. Following the end of the war, Gutiérrez was elected to the Legislative Assembly of El Salvador from 1994 to 1997.

Gutiérrez was raised in Chalchuapa, Santa Ana Department, El Salvador. He studied legal studies at the University of El Salvador, where he became active in politics and the left-wing student movements. Gutiérrez joined the FMLN and became a guerrilla fighter throughout the Salvadoran Civil War during the 1970s and 1980s. He took part in the Chapultepec Peace Accords negotiations, which ended the civil war in 1992.

Gutiérrez served as a deputy in the Legislative Assembly of El Salvador, as a member of the FMLN party, from 1994 to 1997. He became a political analyst after leaving elected office.

At the time of his death, Gutiérrez was serving as the vice rector of Salvadoran Lutheran University (Universidad Luterana Salvadoreña).

Gutiérrez died on July 9, 2024, at the age of 79, after months of declining health.
