= Gray McLean =

- Full name: Douglass Peter Gray McLean
- Born: 22 April 1934 Southport, QLD, Australia
- Died: 4 July 2024 (aged 90)
- Height: 6 ft 3 in (191 cm)
- Weight: 14 st 7 lb (203 lb; 92 kg)

Rugby union career
- Position: Lock
Provincial / State sides
Years	Team	Apps	(Points)
1956-61	Queensland	23	
International career
Years	Team	Apps	(Points)
1958	Australia		

Douglass Peter Gray McLean (22 April 1934 – 4 July 2024) was an Australian international rugby union player.

Born in Southport, Queensland, McLean studied for two years at Toowoomba Grammar School and was still a teenager when he enlisted in the Royal Australian Air Force as a radio apprentice.

McLean, a utility forward, was primarily a second rower. He played for Brisbane club Souths and in 1956 made his representative debut for Queensland. With both Dave Emanuel and Tony Miller unavailable, McLean won a place on the Wallabies squad for the 1958 tour to New Zealand, where he made four uncapped appearances.

== See also ==
- List of Australia national rugby union players
