= José Antonio Sacristán Rodríguez =

Spanish politician (1937–2024)

Member of the Senate
- In office 29 October 1989 – 13 April 1993
- In office 14 January 2004 – 14 January 2008
- Constituency: Palencia

Personal details
- Born: 1937; Spain
- Died: 13 July 2024 (aged 87); Valladolid, Spain
- Political party: Union of the Democratic Centre; People's Party
- Profession: Politician

José Antonio Sacristán Rodríguez (1937 – 13 July 2024) was a Spanish politician. He was a Senator of the People's Party in the fourth and eighth legislatures.

== Biography ==
José Antonio Sacristán began his political career in the ranks of the Union of the Democratic Centre (UCD) as a provincial delegate for the Ministry of Public Works. Later he joined the Partido Popular, becoming a leading figure of the party in the province of Palencia. In 1991, he was appointed spokesman for the PP in the Palencia City Council.

After being a senator for the People's Party in Palencia in the IV legislature (1989–1993). Sacristán was appointed by José María Aznar as Civil Governor of Salamanca (1997–2004). The following year the position of Civil Governor of Salamanca was transformed into Subdelegate of the Government in Salamanca. He was then again a senator for the People's Party in Palencia in the VIII legislature (2004–2008).

Sacristán was married to Gloria Montesinos Sánchez-Real. The couple had six children: Gloria, José Antonio, Esther, Juan, Jaime and Miguel Sacristán Montesinos. Sacristán Rodríguez died in Valladolid on 13 July 2024, at the age of 87.
