= Patrick K. Doughty =

American sports announcer (1969–2024)

Patrick K. Doughty (1969 – July 23, 2024) was an American public address announcer for the National Basketball Association (NBA)'s Charlotte Hornets.

Doughty, a native of Pocomoke City, Maryland, also served as the arena voice for Hawk basketball games at the University of Maryland Eastern Shore from 2000 to 2004. He died on July 23, 2024, at the age of 55.
