= Alfred Zierler =

Alfred Zierler (28 May 1933 – 26 July 2024) was an Austrian medallist and engraver.

== Biography ==
Alfred Zierler was born in Himberg, near Vienna, on 28 May 1933. After Zierler had successfully completed an apprenticeship as an engraver, he found employment at the Vienna Mint where he remained until his retirement in 1993.

Zierler was the engraver for the dies of the Austrian Mint, and served as the mint's chief engraver from 1984 to 1993. He also designed the post-WWII medals of the Republic of Austria.

In 1993, Zierler received the Goldenes Ehrenzeichen (Decoration of Honour in Gold) service medal from the Republic of Austria.

Zierler died on 26 July 2024, at the age of 91.

== Work ==
Zierler designed a long list of Austrian coins, including:

- 25 Schilling 1967 – 250th Anniversary of the birth of Maria Theresia. km 2901.
- 100 Schilling 1977 – 500th Anniversary of the Hall Mint in Tyrol. km 3936
- 50 Schilling 1978 – 150th Anniversary of the death of Franz Schubert. km 2937
- 100 Schilling 1978 – 1100th Anniversary of the city of Villach. km 2940
- 100 Schilling 1979 – Vienna International Centre. km 2944
- 500 Schilling 1981 – 100th Anniversary birth of Otto Bauer. km 2953
- 500 Schilling 1982 – 80th Anniversary birth of Leopold Figl. km 2959
- 500 Schilling 1984 – 175th Anniversary war of liberation in Tyrol. km 2966
- 500 Schilling 1984 – 700th Anniversary of Stift Stams in Tyrol. km 2968
- 500 Schilling 1985 – 40th Anniversary of the end of WW2. km 2972
- 500 Schilling 1987 – 150 Years Austrian Railways. km 2981
- 500 Schilling 1988 – 850th Anniversary of St. Georgenberg Abbey. km 2984
- 500 Schilling 1989 – Gustav Klimt. km 2987
- 20 Schilling 1991 – 200th Birthday of Franz Grillparzer. km 2995
- 100 Schilling 1991 – 700th Anniversary of the death of Rudolf v. Habsburg. km 3001
- 1000 Schilling 1991 – 200th Anniversary of the death of Mozart. km 2999
- 1000 Schilling 1994 – 800th Anniversary of the Vienna Mint. km 3018
- 1000 Schilling 1995 – Olympics. km 3028
