= Nathan F. Ford =

American politician (1927–2024)

Member of the Tennessee House of Representatives from the 11th district
- In office 1977–1988

Personal details
- Born: May 23, 1927 Del Rio, Tennessee, U.S.
- Died: July 22, 2024 (aged 97)
- Children: Three
- Occupation: Optometrist

Nathan F. Ford (May 23, 1927 – July 22, 2024) was an American politician in the state of Tennessee. Ford served in the Tennessee House of Representatives as a Republican from the 11th District from 1981 to 1984. A native of Del Rio, Tennessee, he was an optometrist and alumnus of the Southern College of Optometry. Ford died on July 22, 2024, at the age of 97.
