= Liu Changxiao =

Chinese pharmacologist

- 刘昌孝
- Born: 15 May 1942; Yongxing County, Hunan, China
- Died: 25 July 2024 (aged 82); Beijing, China
- Education: School of Pharmaceutical Sciences, Peking University
- Scientific career
- Fields: Pharmacology; Pharmacokinetics
- Workplaces: Beijing Pharmaceutical Industry Research Institute; Hunan Pharmaceutical Industry Research Institute; Tianjin University of Traditional Chinese Medicine; Tianjin Institute of Traditional Chinese Medicine; Tianjin Institute of Pharmaceutical Industry; Tianjin Institute of Materia Medica

Chinese name
- Simplified Chinese: 刘昌孝
- Traditional Chinese: 劉昌孝
Transcriptions
Standard Mandarin
- Hanyu Pinyin: Liú Chāngxiào

Liu Changxiao (Chinese: 刘昌孝; 15 May 1942 – 25 July 2024) was a Chinese pharmacologist, and an academician of the Chinese Academy of Engineering.

== Biography ==
Liu was born into a poor peasant family in Yangtang Township, Yongxing County, Hunan, on 15 May 1942. In 1961, he was accepted to Beijing Medical College (now Peking University), where he majored in the Department of Pharmacy (now School of Pharmaceutical Sciences).

After university in 1965, Liu became pharmacology team leader of the Beijing Pharmaceutical Industry Research Institute, and served until December 1969, when he was transferred as the similar position to Hunan Pharmaceutical Industry Research Institute. In March 1982, he worked successively at Tianjin University of Traditional Chinese Medicine, Tianjin Institute of Traditional Chinese Medicine, Tianjin Institute of Pharmaceutical Industry, and Tianjin Institute of Materia Medica.

On 25 July 2024, Liu died in Beijing, at the age of 82.

== Honours and awards ==
- 2003 Member of the Chinese Academy of Engineering (CAE)
- 2019 Member of the Chinese Academy of Medical Sciences (CAMS)
- 2020 State Science and Technology Progress Award (Second Class) for the innovative research and development theory, key technologies, and applications of traditional Chinese medicine based on "substance pharmacokinetics efficacy".
