= José María Álvarez =

Spanish poet and novelist (1942–2024)

José María Álvarez (31 May 1942 – 7 July 2024) was a Spanish poet and novelist.

== Life and career ==
José María Álvarez was born in Cartagena, Spain on 31 May 1942. He studied Philosophy and Letters in the University of Murcia, Philosophy in the Sorbonne and subsequently both History and Geography in Spanish universities.

The principal work of Álvarez is Museo de cera (Wax Museum), which was a work in progress for many years due to the author's endeavouring to complete a unique and all-encompassing book (un libro único y totalizador). In the last edition, Álvarez finally brought the cycle to a conclusion.

Álvarez also translated into Spanish the work of, among others, Robert Louis Stevenson, Edgar Allan Poe, Jack London, T.S. Eliot, Shakespeare, François Villon, the complete works of Constantine P. Cavafy, and the poems from the years of madness of Friedrich Hölderlin.

Álvarez followed a number of the trends in contemporary Spanish poetry, passing from socially aware poetry to a culturalism deriving from his life experience. His protagonist is no revolutionary wishing to change lives, but a bon vivant, a disdainer of vulgarity, and a lover of lost causes.

His poems are often bipartite, consisting of an introductory quote (allusions to cinema mythography, theatrical dialogues, fragments of novels, poems, essays, song lyrics, etc.) and the poem itself, which attempts to organise chaos, to explain an incomprehensible world.

Álvarez died on 7 July 2024, at the age of 82.

== Bibliography ==
- 1999, La lágrima de Ahab (The tear of Ahab)
- 2003, Los decorados del olvido (The stage sets of oblivion), a volume of his reminiscences., a poetic work reflecting, generally in a sarcastic tone, on sex and society.

== External links (in Spanish) ==
- CTpedia
- His personal Web Page
- Poems of José María Álvarez
- José María Álvarez in Cisne Negro (The Black Swan)
- José María Álvarez, Sobre Shakespeare (On Shakespeare) (El Gaviero Ediciones, Almería, 2005).
