= Anna Filek =

Polish politician (1933–2024)

Member of Sejm
- In office 20 October 1997 – 18 October 2005

Personal details
- Born: 2 May 1933 Kraków, Poland
- Died: 5 July 2024 (aged 91) Kraków, Poland
- Party: Democratic Left Alliance; Polish United Workers' Party

Anna Maria Filek (2 May 1933 – 5 July 2024) was a Polish politician who served as a member of the Sejm from 1997 to 2005.
