= Robert Pearson (restaurateur) =

British-born American restaurateur (1936–2024)

- Born: November 5, 1936; London, England
- Died: July 8, 2024 (aged 87); Manhattan, New York, U.S.
- Education: London College of Fashion
- Occupation: Restaurateur

Robert Pearson (November 5, 1936 – July 8, 2024) was a British-born American restaurateur.

== Life and career ==
Pearson was born in London on November 5, 1936, the son of Robert Pearson and Emily Hartley. His parents were nurses. He joined the Royal Air Force in 1953. After his discharge, he worked in a candy shop, and attended the London College of Fashion, graduating in 1961, which after graduating, he worked as a hairdresser.

In 1983, Pearson opened Stick to Your Ribs, a barbecue restaurant in Stratford, Connecticut. At his restaurant, he worked as a chef and proprietor. In 1992, he moved his restaurant to Long Island City, Queens. According to The New York Times, his restaurant was named the "Best Texas Barbecue Pit East of the Mississippi". He retired his restaurant in 2005.

== Death ==
Pearson died from complications of Alzheimer's disease at his home in Manhattan, New York, on July 8, 2024, at the age of 87.
