= Richard English (cricketer) =

English cricketer

Richard John English (23 August 1942 ― 12 July 2024) was an English cricketer. He was a right-handed batsman and a right-arm off-break bowler who played for Suffolk.

== Career ==
English picked up his only List A cricketing appearance for Suffolk in the 1966 Gillette Cup, against Kent. Batting in the lower order, he scored a duck in the only List A innings in which he batted. He picked up figures of 1–59 with the ball, his sole wicket being that of Colin Cowdrey.

He played for the county in 82 Minor Counties Championship matches making him Suffolk's most capped player in the competition.

He was one of only six Suffolk players to take over 125 wickets and score over two and a half thousand runs.

== Death ==
English died on 12 July 2024, at the age of 81.
