= Manfred Bierwisch =

German linguist (1930–2024)

Manfred Bierwisch (28 July 1930 – 31 July 2024) was a German linguist in the area of structuralism and generative linguistics, with profound connections to music and cultural theory. Bierwisch is near singular in linguistic-theoretical thought in that he, rooted in Eastern Germany, combined several intellectual streams in the post-WII period before Wende, maintaining scholarly exchanges in dictatorship East Germany - at times at great personal cost, including jail time in the 1950s-, with West Germany, French and North American scholarship.

== Life ==
Bierwisch studied in Leipzig under Theodor Frings. Frings recommended Bierwisch to the Berlin doctoral college but remained his primary PhD supervisor. After an interlude of 10 months in an Eastern German jail for the possession of Western intellectual magazines, Bierwisch was able to join in 1956 the new doctoral college on linguistic structuralism to Humboldt University in East Berlin under the leadership of Wolfgang Steinitz, completing his PhD dissertation in 1961. Bierwisch was not the only linguist to be jailed by the East German authorities (see, e.g. Manfred Görlach). Frings, as a more traditional structuralist, failed to see the relevance of cognitive processes in linguistic analysis, which would, for a while, become the forté of the budding field of generative linguistics. This would cause issues during Bierwisch's later PhD writing phase, which were resolved by Wolfgang Steinitz as secondary reader taking over primary supervisory responsibilities.

== Work ==
Bierwisch was in the interesting position, both in 1960–61 and in 1989–90 and following, to contribute to linguistic thought at particular junctions. In the early 1960s he may have been one of the first on the continent to develop structuralist grammar into a mentalistic approach, influenced by Chomsky's Syntactic Structures. In the 1990s he was one of the few East German academics who did not only not lose his academic standing but increase it, due to his early adoption of cognitive linguistic approaches. It is worth noting that Bierwisch's considered his research groups, which he led in GDR times at the (East) Berlin Academy of Sciences, in the 1960s/early 1970s for Structural Grammar (disbanded by the GDR regime in 1973), and in the 1980s/1990s for Cognitive Linguistics, as continuation of structural linguistics, combined with a mentalistic perspective.
