= Max Leitner =

Italian criminal (1958–2024)

Vallanzasca of Alto Adige Max Leitner
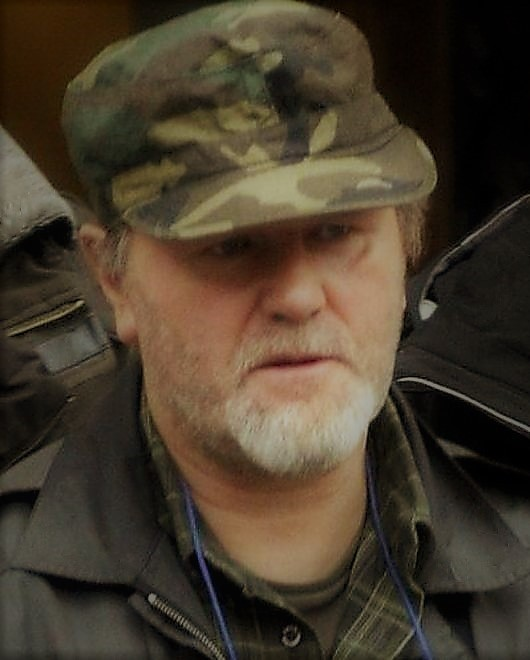
- Born: 27 May 1958; Brixen, South Tyrol, Italy
- Died: 23 July 2024 (aged 66); Merano, South Tyrol, Italy

Max Leitner (27 May 1958 – 23 July 2024) was an Italian criminal, most known for having escaped from prison five times. Dubbed the "Vallanzasca of Alto Adige", Leitner first became infamous through a series of robberies carried out in the 1980s in South Tyrol and other areas of northern Italy.

In 1990 he attempted to attack an armoured vehicle carrying 90 million shillings while in Austria, but was caught and sentenced by a jury to twelve years in prison. Unable to tolerate the living conditions at the Austrian prison, he escaped after a few days and turned himself in to the Italian police at the state border in Prato alla Drava, declaring that he preferred imprisonment in Italy rather than in Austria, where the prisons, he said, were "medieval".

Leitner died on 23 July 2024, at the age of 66.
