= Margaret Patrice Slattery =

American college professor

Margaret Patrice Slattery CCVI
- Born: June 16, 1926; St. Louis, Missouri, U.S.
- Died: July 27, 2024 (aged 98); San Antonio, Texas, U.S.
- Occupation(s): College president, religious sister, English professor

Margaret Patrice Slattery CCVI (June 16, 1926 – July 27, 2024) was an American college professor and religious sister. She was president of the College of the Incarnate Word from 1972 to 1985.

== Early life and education ==
Slattery was born in St. Louis, Missouri, the daughter of Patrick J. Slattery and Margaret Mary Harris Slattery. She graduated from Incarnate Word Academy in 1943. She earned her bachelor's degree at the University of the Incarnate Word in 1952. She earned a master's degree at Marquette University, and completed doctoral studies at the Catholic University of America in 1966, with a dissertation titled "The technique of balance in the construction of character in the novels of Jane Austen". She also studied journalism at the University of Minnesota and the University of Texas, and pursued post-doctoral studies at the University of Edinburgh.

== Vocation ==
In 1944, joined the Congregation of the Sisters of Charity of the Incarnate Word. She took her first vows in 1947, and perpetual vows in 1952. Her brother also found his vocation in the church; Robert P. Slattery was a priest, and executive director of Catholic Charities of St. Louis, the largest private charity in Missouri.

== Career ==
Slattery taught in Catholic schools as a young woman. She was a professor of English at the College of the Incarnate Word, and chair of the English department. She was the school's academic dean from 1969 to 1972, and served as the college's president from 1972 to 1985. From 1985 to 2005, she was chancellor of the university. She oversaw the school's growth in enrollment, programs, and facilities, and its transition into a co-educational institution. "I felt we were doing good things and moving forward and creating a very vibrant institution," she said later in an interview. She was president of the college for its centennial celebrations in 1981.

Slattery was honored by several organizations for her educational leadership, including the Association of Colleges and Universities in Texas, and the San Antonio Express-News. Her two-volume history of her religious order was recognized as an "outstanding contribution" by the Texas Catholic Historical Society. She was inducted into the San Antonio Women's Hall of Fame, and she was in the first class of inductees into the Incarnate Word Academy Hall of Fame.

== Publications ==
- "Structural Unity in Eliot's 'Ash Wednesday'" (1968)
- "Hemingway's A Farewell to Arms" (1968)
- "Patterns of Imagery in Whitman's 'There Was a Child Went Forth'" (1969)
- Promises to Keep (a two-volume history of the Congregation of the Sisters of Charity of the Incarnate Word)

== Personal life ==
Slattery died in 2024, at the age of 98, in San Antonio, Texas.
