= Germán Gutiérrez de Piñeres =

Colombian footballer (1957–2024)

Personal information
- Date of birth: 7 March 1957
- Place of birth: Bogotá, Colombia
- Date of death: 2 July 2024 (aged 67)
- Place of death: Bogotá, Colombia
- Height: 1.80 m (5 ft 11 in)
- Position: Defender

Senior career*
Years	Team	Apps	(Gls)
1978–1990	Millonarios	311	(1)
- * Club domestic league appearances and goals

Germán Gutiérrez de Piñeres (7 March 1957 – 2 July 2024) was a Colombian football player and manager.

== Early life ==
Gutiérrez de Piñeres was born in Bogotá and grew up in Barranquilla, where he attended Colegio San Jose Barranquilla.

== Career ==
Gutiérrez de Piñeres started his career with Colombian side Millonarios. He helped the club win the league.

== Personal life and death ==
Gutiérrez de Piñeres had a daughter and two sons. After retiring from professional football, he suffered depression. Gutiérrez de Piñeres died from respiratory failure on 2 July 2024, at the age of 67.
