= Michael Corcoran (journalist) =

American music journalist and author (1956–2024)

Michael Corcoran (1956 – July 1, 2024) was an American music journalist and author. He wrote for a number of publications including Spin, The Austin Chronicle, the Austin American-Statesman, and The Dallas Morning News. He was the author of All Over the Map: True Heroes of Texas Music.

Corcoran died on July 1, 2024, at the age of 68.
