= Salomon Schulman =

Swedish physician, writer and translator (1947–2024)

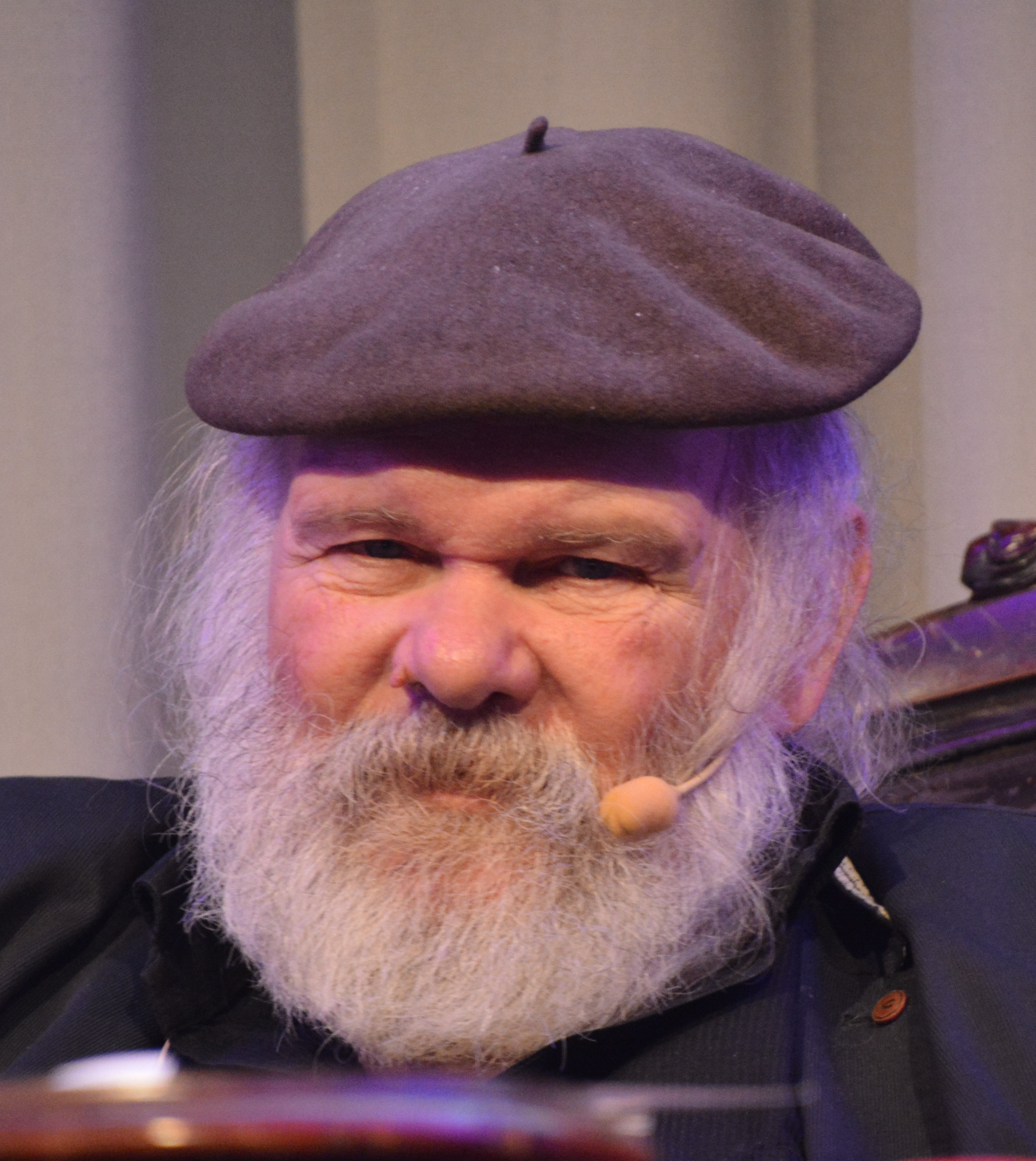
- Schulman at the Gothenburg Book Fair in 2019
- Born: 1 October 1947; Malmö, Sweden
- Died: 15 July 2024 (aged 76); Lund, Sweden
- Occupations: Physician, translator, writer
- Known for: Yiddish-language culture in Sweden

Salomon Schulman (1 October 1947 – 15 July 2024) was a Swedish author, translator and pediatrician.

== Life and career ==
Schulman was born in Malmö to a Yiddish-speaking family. He worked for many years as a translator and was a central figure in Swedish Yiddish culture.

Schulman died in Lund on 15 July 2024, at the age of 76.
