= Helen Whitwell =

British forensic pathologist

Helen Laura Whitwell (1 January 1955 – 24 July 2024) was a British neuropathologist and forensic pathologist. She is notable for being the UK's first female professor of forensic pathology.

== Life and career ==
Whitwell was born on New Year's Day 1955 in Kendal, Westmorland, England, to Edward, an accountant, and Beryl, a maths teacher. She was educated at Kendal High School, a state school and then read medicine at the University of Manchester.

Whitwell was a lecturer in neuropathology at the University of Manchester from 1979 to 1986, before becoming a consultant neuropathologist at the Queen Elizabeth Hospital Birmingham. She joined the Home Office as a forensic pathologist in 1988 and was based in the West Midlands where she undertook up to 60 post-mortems a year. She also acted as an expert witness, including helping to overturn the conviction of Sally Clark and other cases of sudden infant death syndrome or shaken baby syndrome. After briefly lecturing at the University of Auckland in New Zealand, she returned to the United Kingdom to become Professor of Forensic Pathology at the University of Sheffield in 2000; the first woman to hold such a chair. She stepped down in 2004 when the university closed her department and returned to practising forensic pathology. She developed arthritis in her hands in her 50s which meant she had to stop undertaking post-mortems and instead focused on her academic work.

Whiwell was the inspiration for Sam Ryan, the original lead character in the BBC's long-running television series Silent Witness. She also acted as an advisor to the programme.

Whitwell died from cancer, on 24 July 2024, aged 69.

== Selected works ==
- Geddes, J. F.; Whitwell, H. L. (2001). "Head Injury in Routine and Forensic Pathological Practice". Neuropathology. Current Topics in Pathology. Vol. 95. pp. 101–124. doi:10.1007/978-3-642-59554-7_3. ISBN 978-3-642-64025-4. PMID 11545051.
- Geddes, Jennian F.; Whitwell, Helen L. (September 2003). "Neuropathology of Fatal Infant Head Injury". Journal of Neurotrauma. 20 (9): 905. doi:10.1089/089771503322385836. PMID 14577868.
- Whitwell, Helen L., ed. (2005). Forensic neuropathology (1st ed.). London; New York: Hodder Arnold. ISBN 978-0-340-70004-4.
- Whitwell, Helen; Milroy, Christopher; du Plessis, Daniel, eds. (2021). Forensic neuropathology (2nd ed.). Boca Raton: CRC Press. ISBN 978-1-4987-0616-2.
- Whitwell, Helen; Thorne, Katy; Kolar, Alexander; Harvey, Paul (2023). Mason's Forensic Medicine and the Law (7th ed.). London: Bloomsbury Professional. ISBN 978-1-5265-2132-3.
