= Vladimir Khodyrev =

Russian politician (1930–2024)

- Владимир Ходырев
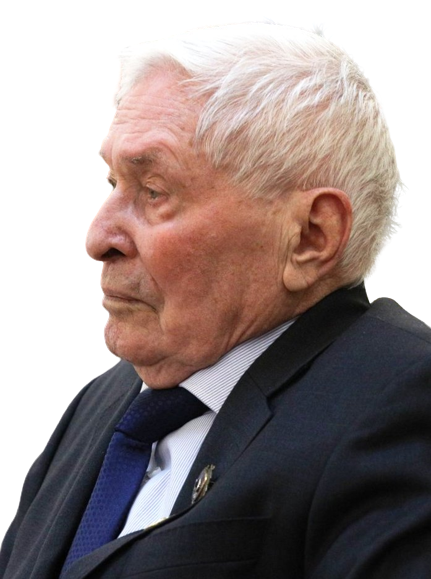
- Khodyrev in 2022

Chairman of the Lensovet
- In office 21 June 1983 – 3 April 1990
- Preceded by: Lev Zaykov
- Succeeded by: Aleksandr Shchelkanov

Personal details
- Born: Vladimir Yakovlevich Khodyrev; 19 May 1930 Stalingrad, Russian SFSR, USSR
- Died: 28 July 2024 (aged 94) Saint Petersburg, Russia
- Party: CPSU (1954–1991)
- Education: Admiral Makarov State Maritime Academy
- Occupation: Engineer

Vladimir Yakovlevich Khodyrev (Russian: Влади́мир Я́ковлевич Хо́дырев; 19 May 1930 – 28 July 2024) was a Russian politician. A member of the Communist Party of the Soviet Union, he served as chairman of the Lensovet from 1983 to 1990.

Khodyrev died in Saint Petersburg on 28 July 2024, at the age of 94.
