= Bhuvaneswari Ramaswamy =

American oncologist and hematologist

- Born: June 17, 1965; Chennai, India
- Died: July 5, 2024 (aged 59); Columbus, Ohio

Academic background
- Education: MD, 1987, Kilpauk Medical College

Bhuvaneswari Ramaswamy (June 17, 1965 – July 5, 2024) was an American breast medical oncologist and hematologist. She served as section chief of Breast Medical Oncology and as director of the Medical Oncology Fellowship Program in Breast Cancer for The Ohio State College of Medicine.

== Early life and education ==
Ramaswamy was born in Chennai, India on June 17, 1965. She earned her medical degree and completed her medical internship at Kilpauk Medical College.

== Career ==
Ramaswamy joined the faculty at Ohio State University in 2006 where she began participating in clinical and translational research in breast cancer. While specializing in breast cancer at Ohio State's Comprehensive Cancer Center (OSUCCC), her research team received an Idea Grant from the non-profit Pelotonia to fund ways to identify breast cancer tumors by blocking a specific signaling pathways. She later participated in a clinical trial which treated patients with bevacizumab, before it was revoked by the Food and Drug Administration for its potential to create life-threatening adverse events. In 2012, Ramaswamy led a study which discovered that Hedgehog (Hhg) could promote growth in breast-cancer cells after tamoxifen shuts down the pathway activated by estrogen. The next year, Ramaswamy received an Idea Grant from Pelotonia to research the effectiveness a drug ordinarily used for skin cancer had on breast cancer tumours.

In 2016, Ramaswamy was diagnosed with poorly differentiated neuroendocrine carcinoma of the breast and she completed her chemotherapy and radiation treatment at Ohio State's Comprehensive Cancer Center by August. While undergoing treatment, she received a $100,000 Pelotonia idea grant to study the link between breastfeeding and risk for triple-negative breast cancer. As the principal investigator, Ramaswamy and her research team examined the molecular changes that occur in the breasts after pregnancy and how a lack of breastfeeding leads to increased risk of TNBC. She also received a $2.2 million, five-year grant from the National Cancer Institute to continue her investigation. She was subsequently recognized by Forbes magazine as one of the United States' exemplary physicians in breast cancer oncology.

As a result of her research, Ramaswamy was appointed the academic chief of the breast medical oncology section and chairperson of the OSUCCC Clinical Scientific Review Committee. She was also named the director of the Medical Oncology Fellowship Program in Breast Cancer for The Ohio State College of Medicine. In 2019, her work was recognized by the Ohio State University College of Medicine’s Center for Faculty Advancement with the Outstanding Mentor Award for Associate Professors.

Ramaswamy died in Columbus, Ohio on July 5, 2024.
