= Hans Pescher =

German ice hockey player (1931–2024)

- Born: 25 April 1931 Krefeld, Germany
- Died: 9 July 2024 (aged 93)
- Position: Centre
- Shot: Left
- Played for: Krefeld Pinguine
- National team: Germany
- Playing career: 1948–1956

Hans Georg Pescher (25 April 1931 – 9 July 2024) was a German professional ice hockey player. He represented Germany in the 1952 Winter Olympics. Pescher died on 9 July 2024, at the age of 93.
