= Jerzy Swatoń =

Polish politician (1947–2024)

Minister of Environment
- In office 2 May 2004 – 25 April 2005
- Preceded by: Czesław Śleziak
- Succeeded by: Tomasz Podgajniak

Personal details
- Born: 24 May 1947 Cieszyn, Poland
- Died: 4 July 2024 (aged 77)
- Education: Prague University of Economics and Business; Silesian University of Technology
- Occupation: Engineer

Jerzy Swatoń (24 May 1947 – 4 July 2024) was a Polish politician. He served as Minister of Environment from 2004 to 2005.

Swatoń died on 4 July 2024, at the age of 77.
