= Yacoub Al-Subaie =

Kuwaiti poet (1945–2024)

Yacoub Yusef Al-Subaie, also spelled Yaqoub Yusef Al Subaie, (1945 – 9 July 2024) was a Kuwaiti poet. He began writing poetry in the 1960s, with his best-known works including "O Sun of Holidays Prevails Over Kuwait" and "We Are All for Kuwait and Kuwait Is Ours."

Al-Subaie was born in 1945. He attended Shuwaikh High School, where he became fascinated with Arabic literature, history, and poetry in the school's library. As a student, his favorite literary works werre of al-Jahiz, "Kitab al-Aghani" by the 10th-century Arabic writer Abu al-Faraj al-Isfahani, "Wafayat al-A'yan" by Ibn Khallikan, and "Uyun al-Akhbar" by Ibn Qutaybah. His other early influences included historical Arabic language texts, including "The Meadows of Gold" by al-Masudi.

Much of Al-Subaie's literature is devoted to Kuwait, often promoting the country's major historical events, holidays, and national unity. For example, some of his best-known poems include "We Are All for Kuwait and Kuwait Is Ours" and "O Sun of Holidays Prevails Over Kuwait." The Kuwaiti Ministry of Education incorporated his literature into its intermediate school curriculum.

Examples of Al-Subaie's poetry collections include "Illuminations of Black Gray Hair", "Falling to the Top", "Silence is the Farm of Suspicions", and "Distances of the Soul."

In 1970, Al-Subaie joined the Kuwaiti Writers Association and served as the organization's secretary from 1986 until 1992. He was also a jury member for the Foundation of Abdulaziz Saud Al-Babtain's Prize for Poetic Creativity.

Aside from his writings, Al-Subaie worked for the Ministry of Interior, the National Bank of Kuwait, and secretary general's office at Kuwait University.

Al-Subaie died on 9 July 2024, at the age of 79.
