= Jim Newbigin =

New Zealand cricketer (1931–2024)

Personal information
- Full name: Edward James Dudley Newbigin
- Born: 15 October 1931; Hastings, New Zealand
- Died: 28 July 2024 (aged 92); Havelock North, New Zealand
- Batting: Right-handed
- Bowling: Right-arm fast

Domestic team information
- Years: Team
- 1953–54: Wellington

Career statistics
Competition	First-class
Matches	2
Runs scored	17
Batting average	8.50
100s/50s	0/0
Top score	7
Balls bowled	406
Wickets	7
Bowling average	31.71
5 wickets in innings	0
10 wickets in match	0
Best bowling	3/37
Catches/stumpings	0/0
- Source: Cricinfo, 24 August 2019

Edward James Dudley Newbigin (15 October 1931 – 28 July 2024) was a New Zealand cricketer. He played two matches of first-class cricket for Wellington in 1953–54.

Newbigin attended Christ's College, Christchurch, and spent his working life in Hastings as a liquor merchant. He represented Hawke's Bay in Hawke Cup cricket in the late 1950s.

Newbigin married Louise Walker in April 1963 and they had three children. He died on 28 July 2024, at the age of 92.
