= Bob Templeton (footballer) =

Australian rules footballer

Personal information
- Full name: John Robert Templeton
- Born: 25 October 1927
- Died: 16 July 2024 (aged 96); Hamilton, Victoria
- Original team: Williamstown Methodists
- Height: 178 cm (5 ft 10 in)
- Weight: 73 kg (161 lb)

Playing career^{1}
Years	Club	Games (Goals)
1947–49, 1953	Footscray	22 (14)
- ^{1} Playing statistics correct to the end of 1953.

John Robert Templeton OAM (25 October 1927 – 16 July 2024) was an Australian rules footballer and administrator, who played with Footscray in the Victorian Football League (VFL). After retiring as a player, Templeton moved into football administration, acting as a president and director for the Hamilton Football Club, the Western Border Football League and the Victorian Country Football League for almost 50 years.
