= Michael Hardy (attorney) =

American civil rights attorney

Michael Anthony Hardy (July 2, 1955 – July 22, 2024) was an American civil rights attorney from Brooklyn, New York, who was involved in civil rights and police brutality cases. Hardy is best known for serving as legal counsel for the civil rights activist Rev. Al Sharpton.

He participated in the Tawana Brawley false rape allegation case and the Eric Garner police chokehold killing case.
