= Waldo Ramos =

Spanish football manager (1944–2024)

Waldo Ramos Díaz (27 June 1944 – 17 July 2024) was a Spanish football manager.

== Career ==
Born in Nerva in the Province of Huelva in Andalusia, Ramos was raised in Catalonia. He coached the youth teams of RCD Espanyol and FC Barcelona, winning national titles with the latter. In the 1980s, he led Palamós CF from the regional leagues to the Segunda División; after three consecutive promotions the team were two points off promotion to La Liga with their result in the 1989–90 Segunda División.

For the 1990–91 season, Ramos moved to CD Málaga, who had been relegated from La Liga. He was sacked on 19 November after 11 games – four wins and five draws – and replaced by former Málaga player Abdallah Ben Barek. Ramos was the first manager to be hired by director of football Juanito, but criticised the director's decision to be a commentator at the 1990 FIFA World Cup in Italy when Ramos thought he should have been signing players.

Ramos also managed Girona FC and UE Figueres, both in his adopted home region.

Ramos died in Lloret de Mar in Catalonia, on 17 July 2024, at the age of 80.
