= Aza Likhitchenko =

Russian television host (1937–2024)

- Аза Лихитченко
- Born: Azalia Vladimirovna Likhitchenko; 20 November 1937; Moscow, Russian SFSR, USSR
- Died: 6 July 2024 (aged 86); Moscow, Russia
- Occupations: Announcer; presenter; actress
- Years active: 1968–1993
- Awards: Order of Friendship (2011)

Azalia Vladimirovna Likhitchenko (Russian: Аза́лия Влади́мировна Лихи́тченко; 20 November 1937 – 6 July 2024) was a Russian announcer for Soviet Central Television from 1968 onwards, and a television and radio host.

== Biography ==
Aza Likhitchenko was born on 20 November 1937. Since 1968, when the information program Vremya appeared, Likhitchenko became one of its main presenters. She worked as an announcer of the Soviet Central Television until 1993.

Likhitchenko died in Moscow on 6 July 2024, at the age of 86.

== Awards and honours ==
- Honored Artist of the RSFSR (1976)
- People's Artist of the RSFSR (1988)
- Order of Friendship (2011) for great achievements in the development of domestic broadcasting and many years of fruitful activity
