= Mack T. Hines =

American politician (1946–2024)

Member of the South Carolina House of Representatives from the 59th district
- In office 1995–2005

Personal details
- Born: Mack Torise Hines, Jr. December 2, 1946 Claussen, South Carolina, U.S.
- Died: July 4, 2024 (aged 77)
- Party: Democratic
- Spouse: Gladys Hines (m. 1971–2024; his death)
- Children: Three sons
- Education: Hood Theological Seminary; Morris College; Allen University

Mack Torise Hines Jr. (December 2, 1946 – July 4, 2024) was an American Baptist minister and politician. Hines served in the South Carolina House of Representatives from 1995 until 2005, becoming the first African American to represent House Seat 59, which is based in Florence, South Carolina.

== Biography ==
Hines was born on December 2, 1946, in Claussen, South Carolina, a small town just outside of Florence. He was the eldest of five children of Susana (née Gregg) Hines and Mack Torise Hines Sr. Hines grew up in Claussen before the family moved to East Florence. There, he attended Holmes Elementary School and graduated from Wilson High School in 1965.

Hines graduated from Allen University with a Bachelor of Arts in history in 1969. He then received a Bachelor of Divinity from Morris College in 1980. Following his graduation from Allen University, Hines worked as a teacher for the Florence 1 School District for twelve years. On February 6, 1971, Hines married Gladys Jackson. The couple had three sons: Mack III, Michael, and Gregory.

In 1984, Hines accepted an invitation to join the ministry of St. Paul Missionary Baptist Church in Mullins, South Carolina, where he served for almost forty years.

Mack T. Hines was elected to the South Carolina House of Representatives from House Seat 59 in 1994. He served in the state House from 1995 until his retirement in 2005.

In 2005, Hines completed his Doctor of Ministry from Hood Theological Seminary in Salisbury, North Carolina.

In May 2005, the South Carolina House of Representatives passed a resolution honoring Hines for earning his Doctor of Ministry degree from Hood Theological Seminary. Hines was awarded the Order of the Palmetto, the state's highest civilian honor, by South Carolina Governor Mark Sanford in 2006 for his service to his state District 59 constituents during his twelve-year tenure in the state House of Representatives. The South Carolina General Assembly also renamed a portion of Highway 76 in neighboring Marion County as the "Representative Mack T. Hines Highway”.

Hines died on July 4, 2024, at the age of 77.
