= Hans Pappa =

Swiss ice hockey player

- Born: 26 July 1936; Switzerland
- Died: 30 July 2024 (aged 88)
- Position: Forward
- National team: Switzerland
- Playing career: 1955–1963

Hans Pappa (26 July 1936 – 30 July 2024) was a Swiss ice hockey player who competed for the Swiss national team at the 1956 Winter Olympics in Cortina d'Ampezzo.
