= Fan Younian =

Chinese politician

- 范有年

Personal details
- Born: July 1944 Shanghai, China
- Died: July 11, 2024 (aged 79–80) Beijing, China
- Party: Chinese Communist Party
- Occupation: Politician

Fan Younian (Chinese: 范有年; July 1944 – July 11, 2024) was a Chinese politician.

== Biography ==
Fan Younian was born in July 1944 in Shanghai and is from Yinxian in the Chinese province of Zhejiang. He became a member of the Chinese Communist Party in December 1965. Fan became a student at the Shanghai Jiao Tong University in 1962 and graduated in 1967. Fan was the chairman of the Supervisory Board of State-Owned Key Large Enterprises between 2001 and 2007. He died on July 11, 2026, in Beijing.
