= Teresa San Román Espinosa =

Spanish anthropologist (1940–2024)

- Born: 1940; A Guarda, Spain
- Died: 14 July 2024 (aged 83–84)
- Occupation: Anthropologist

Teresa San Román Espinosa (1940 – 14 July 2024) was a Spanish anthropologist who developed scientific activities between 1967 and 2010, mainly on Romani people.

== Biography ==
San Román studied history at the Universities of Santiago de Compostela and Madrid. At the beginning of her professional activity she focused on archeology issues. Shortly afterward she changed disciplines, and decided to study anthropology at the University of London, England, where she obtained her master's degree defending her doctoral thesis (1967), supervised by Phyllis Kaberry (disciple of Bronisław Malinowski) and Mary Douglas. From there she dedicated her career mainly to the study of the Romani communities of Madrid and Catalonia, although she also worked with Senegambians and issues related to the elderly.

Between 1982 and 2010, San Román was a professor of social anthropology at the Autonomous University of Barcelona (UAB). She is known for her exhaustive and pioneering studies of the Romani people, a community with whom she also made advances in applied anthropology studies.

San Román directed the Research Group on Interculturality and Margination (GRIM) and specialized in the study of the Romani people. She also researched old age and the Senegambian community. She worked on an ethical and professional intervention focused on an intercultural proposal to confront situations of exclusion and social risk. She was one of the first academics to propose the distinction between marginalization and culture, as well as the need to carry out differentiated interventions based on values and social cohesion. She died on 14 July 2024.

== Selected works ==
- La diferencia inquietante: Viejas y nuevas estrategias culturales de los gitanos. Anthropology and ethnology. With Simon Pates. 2nd edition reprinted from Siglo XXI de España Eds. 288 p. ISBN 8432313343, ISBN 9788432313349 (2010)
- Las relaciones del parentesco. Vol. 23 de Publicacions d'Antropologia Cultural. With Aurora González Echevarría, Jorge Grau Rebollo. Editor Autonomous University of Barcelona, 126 pp. ISBN 844902319X, ISBN 9788449023194 (2003)
- Tres escritos introductorios al estudio del parentesco y una bibliografía clásica general. Vol. 16 de Publicacions d'Antropologia Cultural. With Aurora González Echevarría, Ramón Valdés, Ramón Valdés del Toro. 4th edition from the Autonomous University of Barcelona, 79 pp. ISBN 8449020654, ISBN 9788449020650 (2000)
- La diferència inquietant. Noves i velles estratègies culturals dels gitanos. Fundació Serveis de Cultura Popular. 152 pp. ISBN 8479000554, ISBN 9788479000554 (1994)
- Vejez y cultura : hacia los límites del sistema. Fundación Caja de Pensiones. (1990)
- Entre la marginación y el racismo : reflexiones sobre la vida de los gitanos. Alianza Editorial. 241 pp. ISBN 8420624713, ISBN 9788420624716 (1986)
- Vecinos gitanos. Ed. Akal. 352 pp. ISBN 9788473392181 (1976)
- Gypsies, tinkers and other travellers. Editor Farnham Rehfisch. London, N. York: Academic Press, pp. 169-99 (1975)

== Awards and recognition ==
- 1989: R. Duocastella Award for Research in Social Sciences, Barcelona.
- 1994: Hidalgo Award for the professional trajectory in the fight against racism. National Association Presencia Gitana.
- 2001" Member of Honor of the Federació d'Asociacions Gitanes de Catalunya (Federation of Gypsy Associations of Catalonia).
- 2005: Gold Cross of the Civil Order of Social Solidarity, from the Ministry of Labor and Social Affairs.
- 2009: 8 de Abril Award from the Institute of Romani Culture.
- 2011: Vicens Vives Award from the Generalitat de Catalunya.
- 2011: Fundación Secretariado Gitano Foundation Award.
- 2013: Àlex Seglers Memorial Award, granted by the UAB and the Sabadell City Council.
- 2022: Gold Medal for Scientific Merit awarded by the Barcelona City Council in recognition of her scientific career, academic dedication, and social commitment.
