= Rajeswary Appahu =

Malaysian social media personality

- Born: Rajeswary Appahu; Malaysia
- Died: 5 July 2024; Malaysia
- Cause of death: Suicide
- Other names: Esha
- Occupations: Social media personality, Hindu rights activist
- Known for: Raising awareness about a cosmetic product containing mercury; activism against cyberbullying
- Notable work: TikTok videos

Rajeswary Appahu, better known as Esha, was a Malaysian social media personality who killed herself on 5 July 2024 following online harassment.

Her suicide gained national attention and sparked a government inquest into the issue of cyberbullying in the country.

== Harassment and suicide ==
Referred to in reports as a Hindu rights activist, Rajeswary gained a following on the social media platform TikTok after she helped raise awareness about a cosmetic product that included mercury, leading to its banning.

She became the target of online harassment after an Islamic preacher posted excerpts of a TikTok live show hosted by Rajeswary where a guest, wanted by Malaysian authorities for allegedly insulting the country's royal institutions, made negative remarks about Islam. The preacher, Zamri Vinoth, began a social media campaign urging members of the public to lodge police reports against Rajeswary, leading to her arrest. Harassment continued even after her release from a three-day remand on 28 June.

Fearing for her safety, Rajeswary lodged a police report on 4 July over trolling comments made online during TikTok livestreams where she was subjected to death and rape threats by two individuals, Shalini Periasamy and Sathiskumar Balakrishnan. The report alleged that one of them had claimed to have the backing of a "gang" and encouraged viewers to send a link of the livestream to Rajeswary.

On July 5, Rajeswary was found dead in her condominium at 11 a.m.

== Reactions ==
Rajeswary's suicide gained national attention, with Minister of Communications Fahmi Fadzil announcing that the government may consider amending existing cyberbullying laws in the country, and was covered by The Independent and South China Morning Post internationally. Fadzil revealed that two journalists had also been targeted by the accounts linked to Rajeswary's suicide, including having pictures of their residences and family members taken.

Shalini, also a social media personality, was arrested on 8 July, while Sathiskumar, a lorry driver, was arrested on 10 July. Shalini was fined RM100 after pleading guilty to insulting with the intention to provoke Rajeswary under the Section 14 of the Minor Offences Act 1955 on 16 July. The same day, Sathiskumar was charged with issuing obscene comments directed against Rajeswary as well as insulting the modesty of Rajeswary's mother under Section 233 of the Communications and Multimedia Act 1998 and Section 509 of the Penal Code respectively.

On 12 July, Rajeswary's mother lodged a police report against Zamri Vinoth and two other individuals that had uploaded and conducted livestreams where they allegedly insulted Rajeswary after her suicide.
