= International Journal of Surgical Pathology =

- Discipline: Medical Sciences
- Language: English
- Edited by: Cyril Fisher

Publication details
- History: 1993; 33 years ago – present
- Publisher: SAGE Publications (United States)
- Frequency: 8/year
- Impact factor: 1.188 (2017)

Standard abbreviations
- ISO 4: Int. J. Surg. Pathol.

Indexing
- CODEN: IJSPFL
- ISSN: 1066-8969 (print); 1940-2465 (web)
- LCCN: 2007214840
- OCLC no.: 192031701

Links
- Journal homepage; Online access; Online archive

International Journal of Surgical Pathology is a peer-reviewed academic journal that publishes papers in the field of Pathology. The journal's editor is Cyril Fisher, M.D. It has been in publication since 1993 and is published by SAGE Publications.

== Scope ==
International Journal of Surgical Pathology publishes original research and observations in major organ systems. The journal also contains reviews of new techniques and procedures, discussions of controversies in surgical pathology and case reports. International Journal of Surgical Pathology provides an international forum for the discussion and debate of basic and applied human studies.

== Abstracting and indexing ==
International Journal of Surgical Pathology is abstracted and indexed in, among other databases: SCOPUS, and the Social Sciences Citation Index. According to the Journal Citation Reports, its 2017 impact factor is 1.188, ranking it 146 out of 200 journals in the category ‘Surgery’. and 64 out of 79 journals in the category ‘Pathology’.
