= Harvey Karten =

American neuroscientist

- Born: July 13, 1935
- Died: July 15, 2024 (aged 89)
- Occupations: Professor emeritus of neuroscience, UC San Diego School of Medicine

Harvey Karten (July 13, 1935 – July 15, 2024) was an American neuroscientist who was professor emeritus of neuroscience at the University of California, San Diego School of Medicine.

Karten was a member of the National Academy of Sciences, and was a founding faculty member of the UCSD School of Medicine. Karten was known for evolutionary analyses of non-mammalian brains; his later work included the development of a cell-based database of brain regions, neurons, connections, and chemical properties.

Karten died on July 15, 2024, at the age of 89.
