= 2024 Porto Alegre mayoral election =

2024 Porto Alegre municipal election
- 6 October 2024 (first round); 27 October 2024 (second round)
- Turnout: 68.49% (first round); 65.17% (second round)
- Mayoral election
- Opinion polls
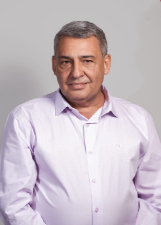

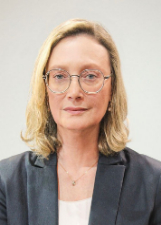
Candidate	Sebastião Melo	Maria do Rosário
Party	MDB	PT
Alliance	We're Together, Porto Alegre	The People in the Prefecture Again
Running mate	Betina Worm	Tamyres Filgueira
Popular vote	406,467	254,128
Percentage	61.53%	38.47%
Mayor before election
Sebastião Melo
MDB
Elected mayor
Sebastião Melo
MDB
- Parliamentary election
Party	Leader	Current seats
Municipal Chamber
FE Brasil	—N/a	6
MDB	Pablo Melo	4
PSOL	Karen Santos	4
PSDB-Cidadania	—N/a	4
Republicanos	Alvoni Medina	3
PL	Fernanda Barth	3
PDT	Márcio Bins Ely	2
PODE	Giovane Byl	2
PP	Mônica Leal	2
NOVO	Tiago Albrecht	2
PSB	Airto Ferronato	1
PSD	Cláudia Araújo	1
Solidarity	Claudio Janta	1
UNIÃO	Cláudio Conceição	1

The 2024 Porto Alegre mayoral election took place on 6 October 2024. Voters elected a mayor, a vice mayor, and 36 councillors. The incumbent mayor, Sebastião Melo, a member of the Brazilian Democratic Movement (MDB), was elected in 2020 for his first term and ran for reelection.

The mayor's term will begin on 1 January 2025 and end on 31 December 2028.

== Background ==
=== 2020 election ===
The last mayoral election in Porto Alegre, held in 2020, resulted in the victory of the lawyer and politician Sebastião Melo in the second round. Melo obtained 370,550 votes (54.63% of the valid votes) against the 307,745 votes (45,37% of the valid votes) obtained by his opponent, Manuela d'Ávila (PCdoB).

=== Approval ratings and 2024 Rio Grande do Sul floods ===
In a poll conducted in the end of March 2024, Melo's government was approved by 58% of the citizens of Porto Alegre, making him the front-runner in most of the election scenarios. However, after the 2024 Rio Grande do Sul floods that happened in the end of April to May, that also affected the city of Porto Alegre, his lead in polls may be contested. One of the main themes of the 2024 elections will be the reconstruction of the city that is still flooded. The city's protection against floods are responsibility of the mayor of Porto Alegre and during the electoral campaign, his opponents may question his leadership and decisions that've been taken by his government during the floods.

=== Possible postponement ===
There was a debate among national political forces about a possible postponement of the elections due to the floods in the state. However, the president of the Superior Electoral Court, Alexandre de Moraes, confirmed on 21 May 2024 that there is no discussions about a postponement. He states that there was no structural damage to the Regional Electoral Court of Rio Grande do Sul and to the electoral courts that would prevent the election from being held in the month of October throughout the state and in the city of Porto Alegre.

== Electoral calendar ==
Electoral calendar announced by the Superior Electoral Court (TSE) on 3 January 2024
7 March – 5 April	Period of the 'party window' for councillors. During this period, the councillors are able to move to other political parties in order to run for election while not losing their respective political terms.
6 April	Deadline for all parties and party federations to obtain the registration of their statutes at the Superior Electoral Court and for all candidates to have their electoral domicile in the constituency in which they wish to contest the elections with the affiliation granted by the party.
15 May	Start of the preliminary fundraising campaign in the form of collective financing for potential candidates. During this period, candidates are not allowed to ask for votes and are still subjected to obey the rules regarding electoral propaganda on the Internet.
20 July – 5 August	On this date, party conventions begin to deliberate on coalitions and choose candidates for mayors and councillors tickets. Parties have until 15 August to register their names with the Brazilian Election Justice.
16 August	Beginning of electoral campaigns on an equal basis, with any advertising or demonstration explicitly requesting for votes before the date being considered irregular and subject to fines.
30 August –3 October	Broadcasting of free electoral propaganda on radio and television.
6 October	Date of mayoral elections.
27 October	Date of a possible second round in cities with more than 200,000 voters in which the most voted candidate for mayor has not reached 50% of the valid votes.

== Candidates ==
=== Presumptive candidates ===
Party	Mayoral candidate	Running mate		Coalition
Democratic Labour Party (PDT 12)	Juliana Brizola: State Deputy of Rio Grande do Sul (2011–2023); Councillor of Porto Alegre (2009–2011)	Brazil Union (UNIÃO)	Thiago Duarte: State Deputy of Rio Grande do Sul (2019–present); Councillor of Porto Alegre (2008; 2011–2018)	United for Porto Alegre: Democratic Labour Party (PDT); Brazil Union (UNIÃO); Always Forward Federation (PSDB, Cidadania)
Workers' Party (PT 13)	Maria do Rosário: Federal Deputy of Rio Grande do Sul (2003–present); Minister of Human Rights (2011–2014); State Deputy of Rio Grande do Sul (1999–2003); Councillor of Porto Alegre (1993–1999)	Socialism and Liberty Party (PSOL)	Tamyres Filgueira: Black Movement Activist; Civil Servant	The People at City Hall Again: Brazil of Hope (PT, PCdoB, PV); PSOL REDE Federation (PSOL, REDE); Brazilian Socialist Party (PSB); Avante
Brazilian Democratic Movement (MDB 15)	Sebastião Melo: Mayor of Porto Alegre (2021–present); State Deputy of Rio Grande do Sul (2019–2021); Vice Mayor of Porto Alegre (2013–2017); Councillor of Porto Alegre (2001–2013)	Liberal Party (PL)	Betina Worm: Lieutenant colonel of the Brazilian Army	We Are Together, Porto Alegre: Brazilian Democratic Movement (MDB); Liberal Party (PL); Progressistas (PP); Democratic Renewal Party (PRD); Podemos (PODE); Republicans; Social Democratic Party (PSD); Solidarity
United Socialist Workers' Party (PSTU 16)	Fabiana Sanguiné: Medical Nursing Assistant; Trade Union Organizer	United Socialist Workers' Party (PSTU)	Régis Ethur: Teacher	United Socialist Workers' Party (PSTU)
Brazilian Labour Renewal Party (PRTB 28)	Carlos Rosa Alan de Castro: Businessman	Christian Democracy (DC)	João Alberto Morsch: Civil Engineer and Businessman	Renew Porto Alegre: Brazilian Labour Renewal Party (PRTB); Christian Democracy (DC)
New Party (NOVO 30)	Felipe Camozzato: State Deputy of Rio Grande do Sul (2023–present); Councillor of Porto Alegre (2017–2023)	New Party (NOVO)	Raqueli Baumbach: Businesswoman; Vice-president of the Sindha (Accommodation and Food Union of Porto Alegre Metropolis)	New Party (NOVO)
Popular Unity (UP 80)	Luciano Schafer: National Coordinator of the Neighborhood Struggle Movement (NSM)	Popular Unity (UP)	Amanda Benedett: University Student	Popular Unity (UP)

=== Potential candidates ===
Cidadania

- Any Ortiz – Member of the Chamber of Deputies from Rio Grande do Sul (2023–present); Member of the Legislative Assembly of Rio Grande do Sul (2015–2023) and Councillor of Porto Alegre (2013–2014).
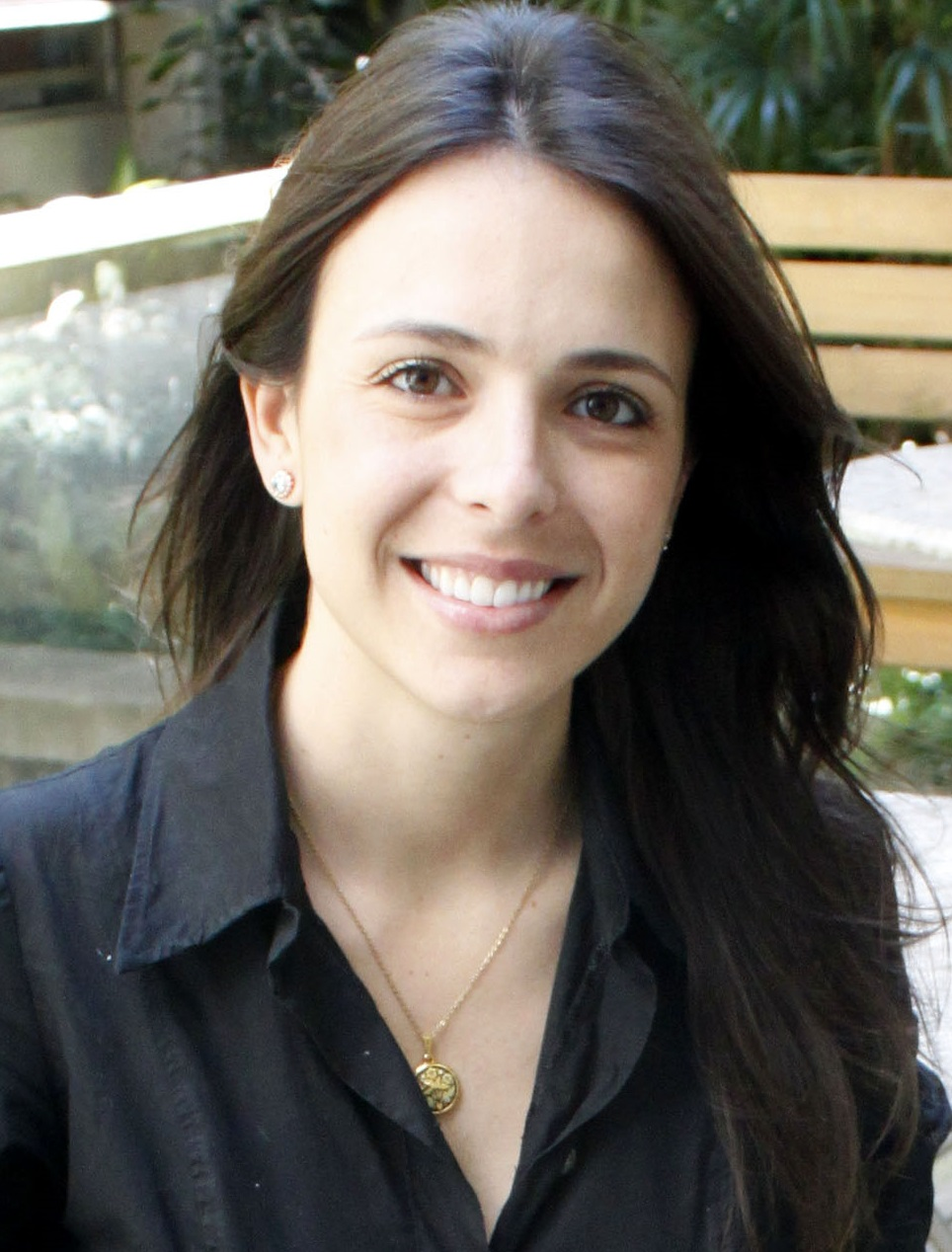
Federal Deputy
Any Ortiz (Cidadania)
from Canoas

=== Withdrawn candidates ===
Socialism and Liberty Party (PSOL)

- Luciana Genro – Member of the Legislative Assembly of Rio Grande do Sul (1995–2003; 2019–present) and member of the Chamber of Deputies from Rio Grande do Sul (2003–2011); she withdrew her candidacy on 2 March 2024 and will support Maria do Rosário's candidacy along with the party and the PSOL REDE Federation.

Brazilian Social Democracy Party (PSDB)

- Nadine Anflor – Member of the Legislative Assembly of Rio Grande do Sul (2023–present).

Liberal Party (PL)

- Comandante Nádia – Councillor of Porto Alegre (2017–present).
- Luciano Zucco – Member of the Chamber of Deputies from Rio Grande do Sul (2023–present) and Member of the Legislative Assembly of Rio Grande do Sul (2019–2023).

Both Nádia and Zucco's candidacies were automatically withdrawn by the Liberal Party of Porto Alegre when the party nominated Betina Worm as the running mate of Sebastião Melo.

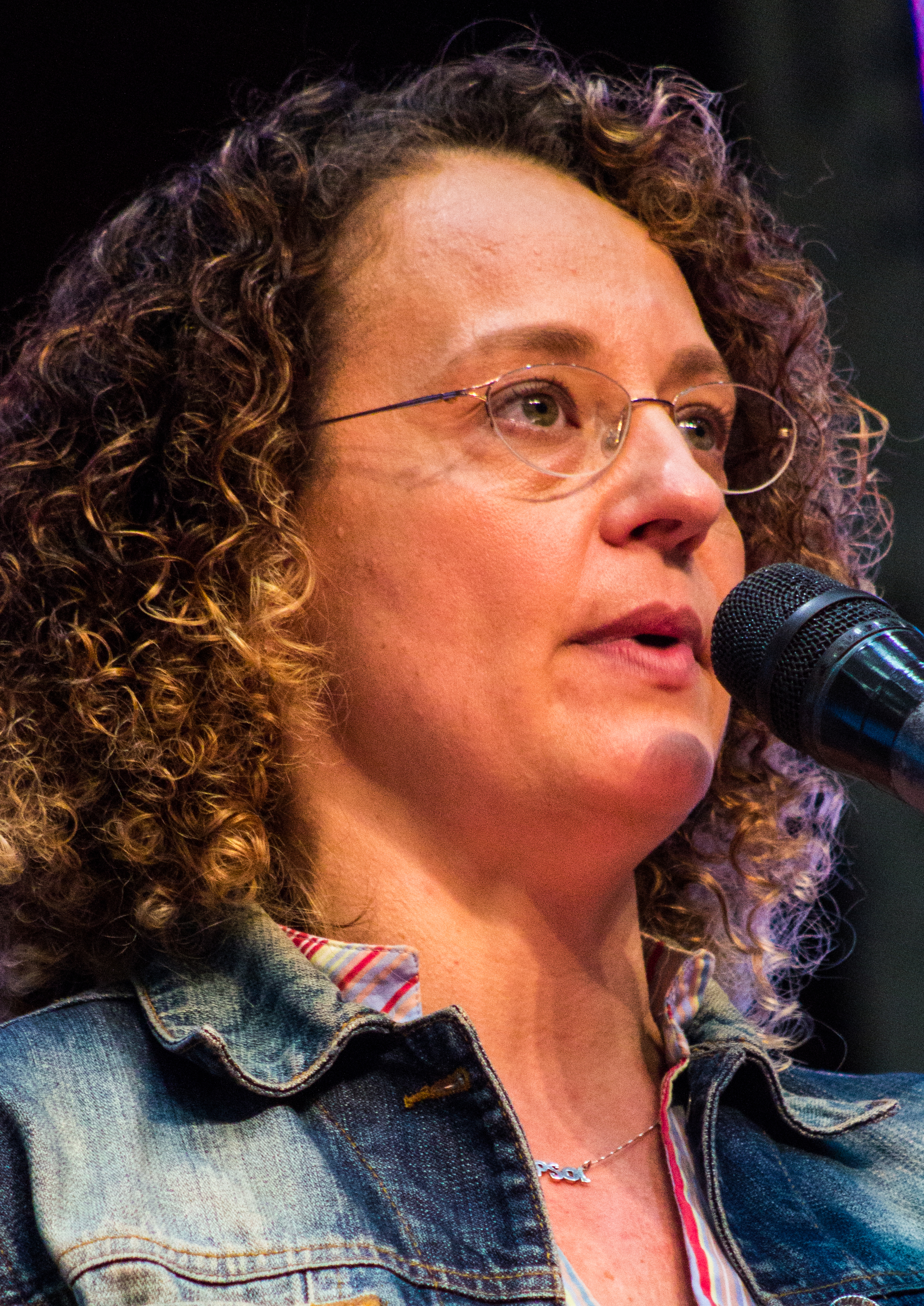
State Deputy
Luciana Genro (PSOL)
from Santa Maria

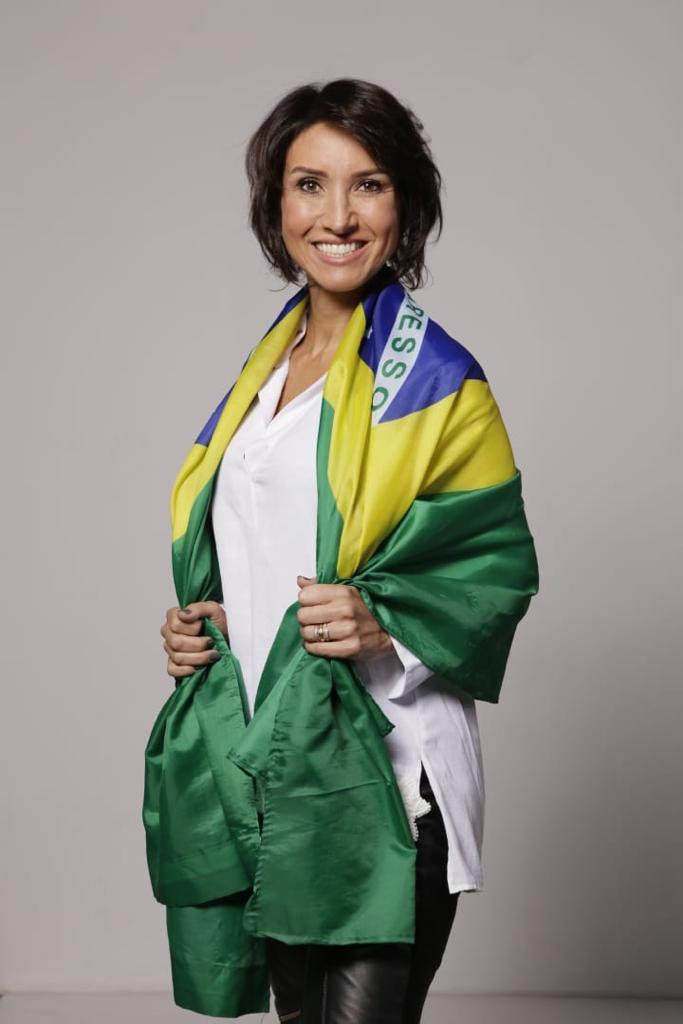
Councillor
Comandante Nádia (PL)
from Porto Alegre

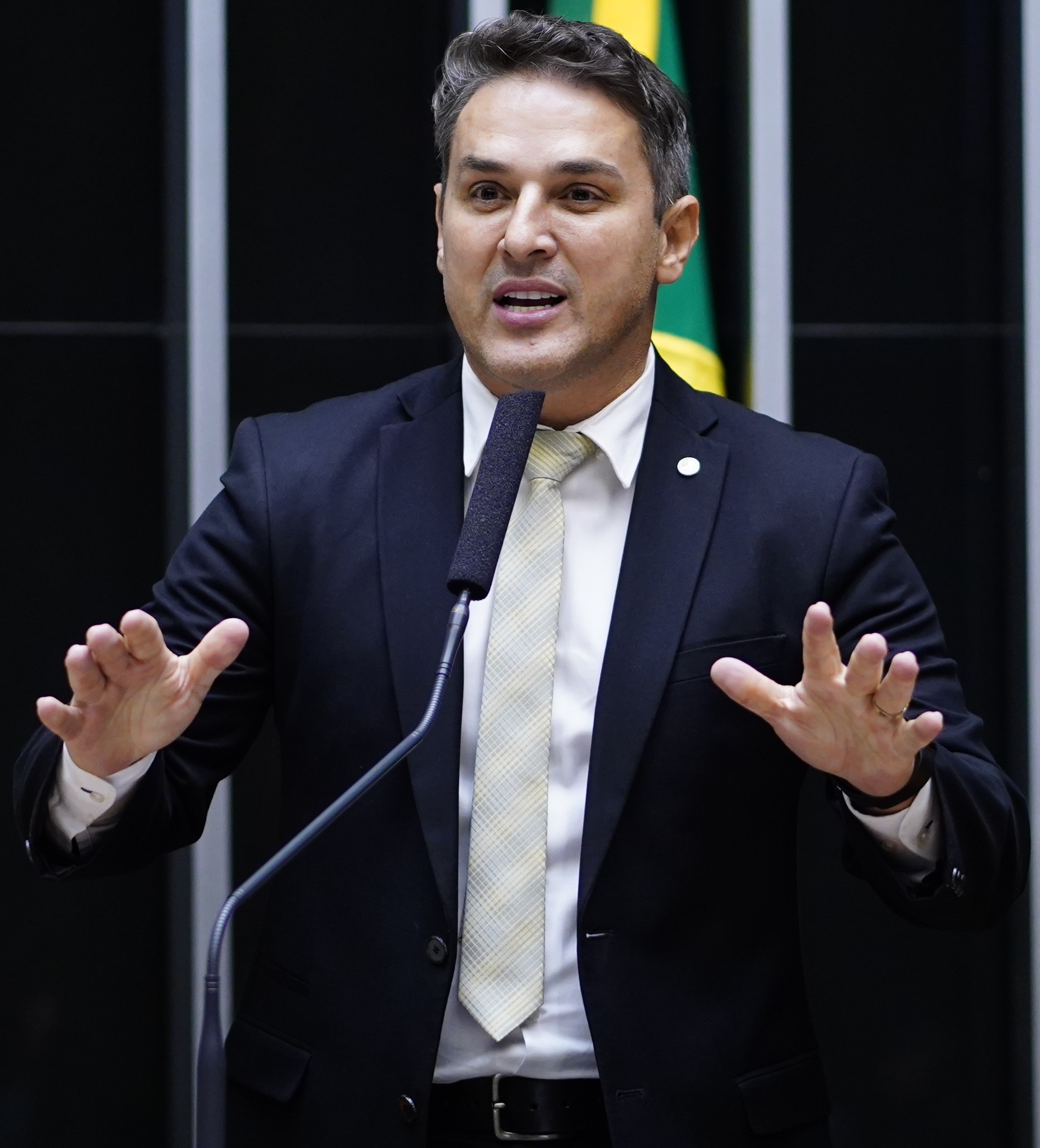
Federal Deputy
Luciano Zucco (PL)
from Alegrete

== Outgoing Municipal Chamber ==
The result of the last municipal election and the current situation in the Municipal Chamber is given below:

Affiliation	Members		+/–
Affiliation	Elected	Current (Note: Between March and April 2024, councilors were able to change parties during the so-called "party window" without losing their respective terms.)	+/–
MDB	3	4	▲1
PT	4	4	Steady
PSOL	4	4	Steady
PL	1	3	▲2
Republicanos	2	3	▲1
PSDB	4	3	▼1
PODE	0	2	▲2
PCdoB	2	2	Steady
PDT	2	2	Steady
PP	2	2	Steady
NOVO	2	2	Steady
UNIÃO	didn't exist	1	▲1
PSB	1	1	Steady
Cidadania	1	1	Steady
PSD	1	1	Steady
Solidarity	1	1	Steady
PRTB	1	0	▼1
PSL	1	extinct party (Note: Democrats (DEM) and the Social Liberal Party (PSL) merged into the Brazil Union in February 2022.)	▼1
DEM	1	extinct party (Note: Democrats (DEM) and the Social Liberal Party (PSL) merged into the Brazil Union in February 2022.)	▼1
PTB	3	extinct party (Note: Brazilian Labour Party (PTB) and Patriota merged into the Democratic Renewal Party (PRD) in November 2023.)	▼3
Total	36		

== Opinion polls ==
=== First round ===
2024

17 July			The Liberal Party (PL) nominates Betina Worm as the running mate of Sebastião Melo (MDB).										
Pollster/client(s)	Date(s) conducted	Sample size	Melo MDB	Rosário PT	Ortiz Cidadania	Nádia PL	J. Brizola PDT	Camozzato NOVO	Duarte UNIÃO	Sanguiné PSTU	Others	Abst. Undec.	Lead
Futura Inteligência	17–21 June	800	28%	29.2%	5.8%	—N/a	10%	2.9%	5.1%	—N/a	3.1% (Note: Luciano Zucco (PL))	15.7%	1.2%
Futura Inteligência	17–21 June	800	27.2%	29.6%	8.9%	—N/a	—N/a	4.2%	6.5%	—N/a	5.9% (Note: Luciano Zucco (PL))	17.7%	2.4%
Futura Inteligência	17–21 June	800	25.3%	28.1%	—N/a	9.6%	10.1%	—N/a	7.9%	—N/a	4% (Note: Nadine Anflor (PSDB))	15%	2.8%
Veritá	12–16 June	1,002	25.3%	15.4%	3.8%	—N/a	4%	—N/a	1.4%	—N/a	30.6% (Note: Manuela d'Ávila (PCdoB) with 19.1%; Luciano Zucco (PL) with 9.5%; Nadine Anflor (PSDB) and Mari Pimentel (Republicanos) with 1% each)	19.5%	6.2%
Atlas/CNN	9–14 June	1,798	24.8%	30.2%	9.1%	8.5%	8.2%	6.7%	1.3%	1.3%	—N/a	9.9%	5.4%
Atlas/CNN	9–14 June	1,798	28.3%	31.8%	—N/a	—N/a	11.7%	9.1%	1.9%	1.5%	—N/a	15.7%	3.5%
29 April			A severe flood hits the state of Rio Grande do Sul and the city of Porto Alegre, resulting in the worst environmental disaster in the city's history.										
1 April			Nadine Anflor announces the withdrawal of her potential candidacy for mayor of Porto Alegre.										
Pollster/client(s)	Date(s) conducted	Sample size	Melo MDB	Rosário PT	Ortiz Cidadania	Nádia PL	J. Brizola PDT	Camozzato NOVO	Duarte UNIÃO	Nadine PSDB	Others	Abst. Undec.	Lead
RealTime Big Data	29–30 March	1,000	40%	22%	5%	4%	5%	—N/a	2%	2%	7% (Note: Luciana Genro (PSOL))	15%	18%
RealTime Big Data	29–30 March	1,000	41%	22%	—N/a	5%	6%	—N/a	2%	2%	7% (Note: Luciana Genro (PSOL))	15%	19%
RealTime Big Data	29–30 March	1,000	41%	26%	6%	—N/a	—N/a	—N/a	2%	—N/a	7% (Note: Luciana Genro (PSOL))	18%	15%
RealTime Big Data	29–30 March	1,000	42%	26%	—N/a	—N/a	8%	—N/a	3%	3%	—N/a	18%	16%
2–22 March			Luciana Genro withdraws her potential candidacy and decides to support Maria do Rosário (PT). Felipe Camozzato is announced as a potential candidate by the New Party (NOVO). Comandante Nádia leaves Progressistas (PP) in order to join the Liberal Party (PL).										

2023

Pollster/client(s)	Date(s) conducted	Sample size	Melo MDB	Rosário PT	Genro PSOL	J. Brizola PDT	Duarte UNIÃO	Nadine PSDB	Pimentel NOVO	Cunha PDT	d'Ávila PCdoB	Others	Abst. Undec.	Lead
Futura Inteligência	22–27 November	1,024	33.5%	—N/a	—N/a	4.7%	—N/a	—N/a	0.6%	—N/a	13.1%	34.2% (Note: José Fortunati (UNIÃO) with 10.8%; Onyx Lorenzoni (PL) with 9.6%; Edegar Pretto (PT) with 9.1% and Pedro Ruas (PSOL) with 4.7%)	14.1%	20.4%
Futura Inteligência	22–27 November	1,024	36.1%	9.2%	6.6%	—N/a	9.2%	2.1%	0.3%	8.1%	14%	—N/a	14.4%	22.1%
Futura Inteligência	22–27 November	1,024	43.6%	—N/a	—N/a	11.4%	10.7%	—N/a	0.5%	—N/a	—N/a	11.3% (Note: Sofia Cavedon (PT) with 6.7% and Roberto Robaina (PSOL) with 4.6%)	22.6%	32.2%
Futura Inteligência	22–27 November	1,024	40.5%	—N/a	—N/a	—N/a	10.4%	—N/a	0.8%	8.8%	17.6%	6.1% (Note: Sofia Cavedon (PT) with 4.5% and Roberto Robaina (PSOL) with 1.6%)	15.9%	22.9%
Instituto Ver	28 October–3 November	1,000	33%	27%	—N/a	7%	2%	1%	1%	—N/a	—N/a	—N/a	30%	6%
Instituto Ver	28 October–3 November	1,000	30%	24%	7%	7%	2%	1%	1%	—N/a	—N/a	2% (Note: Gustavo Victorino (Republicanos))	28%	6%
Instituto Ver	28 October–3 November	1,000	31%	24%	—N/a	8%	2%	1%	1%	—N/a	—N/a	6% (Note: Fernanda Melchionna (PSOL) with 4% and Gustavo Victorino (Republicanos) with 2%)	28%	7%
Instituto Ver	28 October–3 November	1,000	38%	—N/a	—N/a	9%	3%	1%	2%	—N/a	—N/a	13% (Note: Sofia Cavedon (PT))	34%	25%
Instituto Ver	28 October–3 November	1,000	36%	—N/a	7%	8%	2%	1%	2%	—N/a	—N/a	13% (Note: Sofia Cavedon (PT) with 11% and Gustavo Victorino (Republicanos) with 2%)	31%	25%
Instituto Ver	28 October–3 November	1,000	34%	23%	7%	—N/a	2%	1%	2%	—N/a	—N/a	2% (Note: Gustavo Victorino (Republicanos))	28%	11%
Instituto Methodus	November	600	52%	—N/a	—N/a	13%	5%	3%	3%	—N/a	—N/a	—N/a	24%	39%
Instituto Methodus	November	600	48%	—N/a	17%	—N/a	5%	3%	3%	4%	—N/a	—N/a	20%	31%
Instituto Methodus	November	600	48%	25%	—N/a	—N/a	5%	3%	2%	—N/a	—N/a	—N/a	17%	23%
Instituto Methodus	November	600	46%	—N/a	—N/a	—N/a	5%	4%	1%	—N/a	27%	—N/a	17%	19%
November			Maria do Rosário is announced as a potential candidate by the Workers' Party (PT).											
Pollster/client(s)	Date(s) conducted	Sample size	Melo MDB	Pretto PT	Lorenzoni PL	J. Brizola PDT	Fortunati UNIÃO	Marchezan Jr. PSDB	Ruas PSOL	Nádia PP	Camozzato NOVO	Others	Abst. Undec.	Lead
Instituto Methodus	3–7 April	600	35%	14%	11%	—N/a	2%	—N/a	1%	1%	—N/a	16.7% (Note: Manuela d'Ávila (PCdoB) with 15%; Any Ortiz (Cidadania) and Marcel van Hattem (NOVO) with 0.7% each and Luciano Zucco (Republicanos) with 0.3%)	18%	20%
Paraná Pesquisas	22–26 March	806	31.8%	14.4%	8.3%	6.8%	6.2%	6.1%	5.6%	3.5%	2.4%	3.6% (Note: Luciano Zucco (Republicanos) with 1.9% and Beto Albuquerque (PSB) with 1.7%)	11.4%	17.4%
Paraná Pesquisas	22–26 March	806	36.7%	16.5%	—N/a	7.9%	—N/a	8.2%	6.3%	6.2%	3.1%	—N/a	15%	20.2%
Paraná Pesquisas	22–26 March	806	36.2%	16.4%	10%	8.8%	—N/a	—N/a	6.2%	—N/a	3%	4% (Note: Any Ortiz (Cidadania))	15.4%	19.8%

=== Second round ===
These are the hypothetical scenarios of a second round.

Sebastião Melo and Maria do Rosário

Pollster/client(s)	Date(s) conducted	Sample size	Melo MDB	Rosário PT	Abst. Undec.	Lead
Futura Inteligência	17–21 June 2024	800	47.2%	39.5%	13.3%	7.7%
Atlas/CNN	9–14 June 2024	1,798	43.7%	38.2%	18.1%	5.5%
RealTime Big Data	29–30 March 2024	1,000	53%	33%	14%	20%

Sebastião Melo and Luciana Genro

Pollster/client(s)	Date(s) conducted	Sample size	Melo MDB	Genro PSOL	Abst. Undec.	Lead
RealTime Big Data	29–30 March 2024	1,000	55%	29%	16%	26%

Maria do Rosário and Any Ortiz

Pollster/client(s)	Date(s) conducted	Sample size	Rosário PT	Ortiz Cidadania	Abst. Undec.	Lead
Futura Inteligência	17–21 June 2024	800	40.7%	35.1%	24.2%	5.6%

=== Rejection of candidates ===
In some opinion polls, the interviewee can choose more than one alternative (the so-called "multiple rejection"), therefore, the sum of the percentages of all candidates can exceed 100% of the votes in some scenarios.

Pollster/client(s)	Date(s) conducted	Sample size	Rosário PT	Genro PSOL	d'Ávila PCdoB	Melo MDB	Duarte UNIÃO	Pimentel NOVO	Nadine PSDB	J. Brizola PDT	Could vote in anyone	Others	Abst. Undec.
Futura Inteligência	22–27 November 2023	1,024	36.5%	23.2%	29.6%	21%	—N/a	—N/a	—N/a	—N/a	—N/a	31.1% (Note: Onyx Lorenzoni (PL))	—N/a
Instituto Methodus	November 2023	600	33%	30%	29%	27%	14%	11%	11%	10%	26%	10% (Note: Vieira da Cunha (PDT))	3%

== Results ==
=== Mayor ===
Candidate	Running mate	Party	First round		Second round	
Candidate	Running mate	Party	Votes	%	Votes	%
Sebastião Melo (incumbent)	Betina Worm (PL)	Brazilian Democratic Movement	345,420	49.72	406,467	61.53
Maria do Rosário	Tamyres Filgueira (PSOL)	Workers' Party	182,553	26.28	254,128	38.47
Juliana Brizola	Thiago Duarte (UNIÃO)	Democratic Labour Party	136,783	19.69		
Felipe Camozzato	Raqueli Baumbach	New Party	26,603	3.83		
Luciano Schafer	Amanda Benedett	Popular Unity	1,476	0.21		
Fabiana Sanguiné	Regis Ethur	United Socialist Workers' Party	1,163	0.17		
Carlos Alan	João Morsch (DC)	Brazilian Labour Renewal Party	483	0.07		
Cesar Pontes	Ulisses Lima	Workers' Cause Party	204	0.03		
Total			694,685	100.00	660,595	100.00
Valid votes			694,685	92.49	660,595	92.44
Invalid votes			25,012	3.33	26,811	3.75
Blank votes			31,379	4.18	27,249	3.81
Total votes			751,076	100.00	714,655	100.00
Registered voters/turnout			1,096,620	68.49	1,096,620	65.17
MDB hold						

=== Municipal Chamber ===
Party or alliance		Votes	%	Seats	+/–
Brazil of Hope	Workers' Party	80,771	12.04	5	▲1
Brazil of Hope	Communist Party of Brazil	17,771	2.65	2	Steady
Brazil of Hope	Green Party	4,084	0.61	0	Steady
Liberal Party		78,451	11.69	4	▲3
PSOL REDE; Federation	Socialism and Liberty Party	77,633	11.57	5	▲1
PSOL REDE; Federation	Sustainability Network	3,066	0.46	0	Steady
Brazilian Democratic Movement		67,234	10.02	3	Steady
Republicans		45,871	6.84	3	▲1
PSDB Cidadania; Federation	Brazilian Social Democracy Party	45,353	6.76	3	▼1
PSDB Cidadania; Federation	Cidadania	17,403	2.59	1	Steady
Progressistas		43,226	6.44	3	▲1
New Party		42,896	6.39	2	Steady
Podemos		42,138	6.28	2	▲2
Democratic Labour Party		33,466	4.99	1	▼1
Brazil Union		18,560	2.77	0	New
Social Democratic Party		16,914	2.52	1	Steady
Solidariedade		15,106	2.25	0	▼1
Brazilian Socialist Party		10,002	1.49	0	▼1
Democratic Renewal Party		8,864	1.32	0	New
Popular Unity		1,607	0.24	0	Steady
United Socialist Workers' Party		633	0.09	0	Steady
Total		671,049	100.00	35	–
Valid votes		671,049	89.35		
Invalid votes		29,967	3.99		
Blank votes		50,060	6.67		
Total votes		751,076	100.00		
Registered voters/turnout		1,096,620	68.49		
