= Sebastião Melo =

Brazilian politician (born 1958)

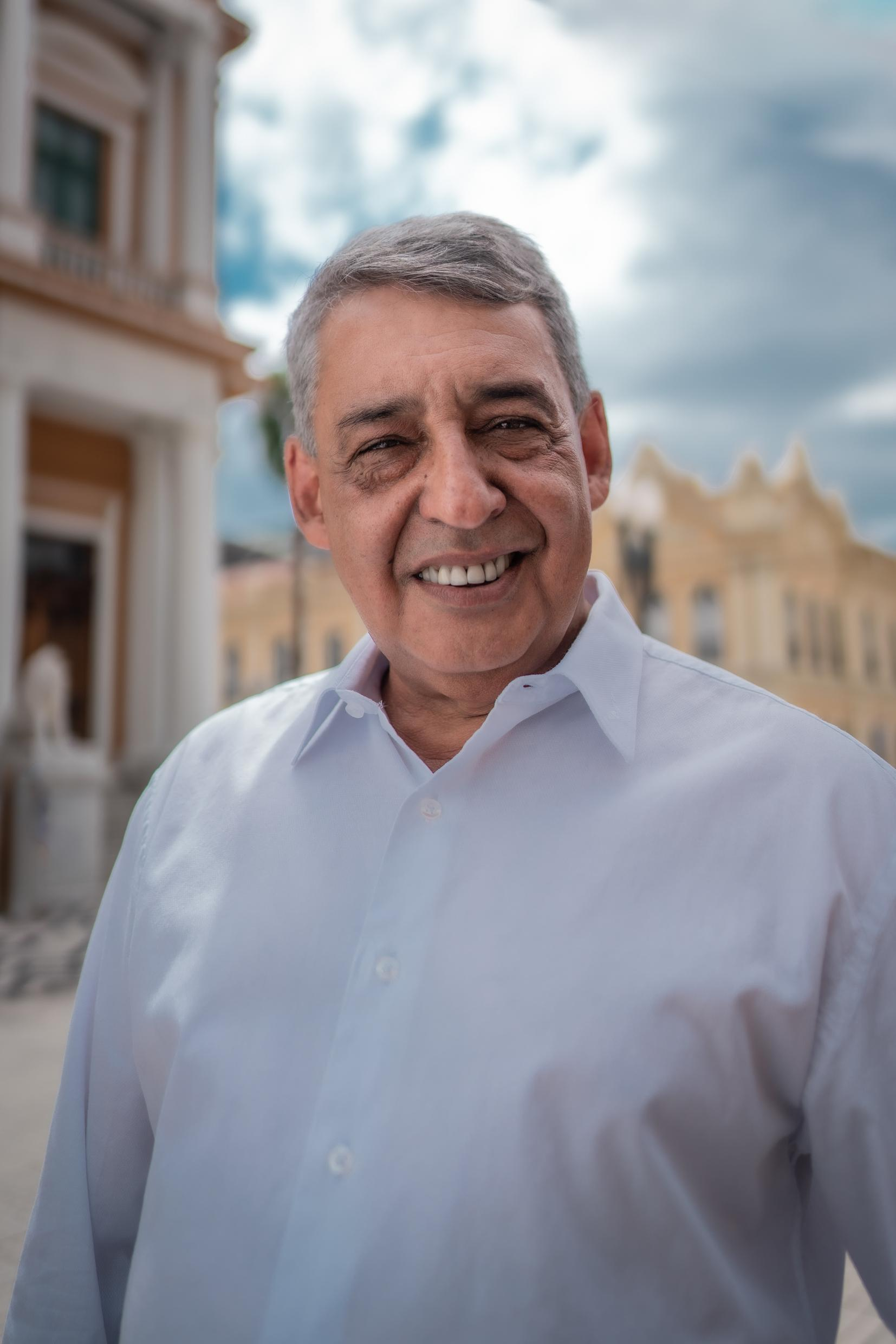
- Melo in 2025

66th Mayor of Porto Alegre
- Incumbent
- Assumed office 1 January 2021
- Preceded by: Nelson Marchezan Júnior

State deputy of Rio Grande do Sul
- In office 1 February 2019 – 1 January 2021

Vice Mayor of Porto Alegre
- In office 1 January 2013 – 1 January 2017
- Mayor: José Fortunati
- Preceded by: José Fortunati
- Succeeded by: Gustavo Paim

Councilman of Porto Alegre
- In office 1 January 2001 – 1 January 2013

Personal details
- Born: Sebastião de Araújo Melo; 24 July 1958 (age 68) Piracanjuba, Goiás, Brazil
- Party: PMDB (1981–present)
- Spouse: Valéria Leopoldino
- Children: 2
- Education: Unisinos
- Occupation: Lawyer, politician

Sebastião de Araújo Melo (born 24 July 1958) is a Brazilian lawyer and politician. He has been the mayor of Porto Alegre since 2021.

A member of the Brazilian Democratic Movement (MDB) since 1981, he had been a member of the city council from 2001 to 2012 and was the vice-mayor of the city during the mayorship of José Fortunati. In 2018, he was elected as a state deputy to the Legislative Assembly of the state of Rio Grande do Sul, a position he held until 2021.

Melo has run for mayor of Porto Alegre on three occasions. The first time, in 2016, he advanced to the second round, but was defeated by Nelson Marchezan Júnior. In 2020, he ran again and advanced once again to the second round, this time winning against Manuela d'Ávila. He would be reelected in 2024 against Maria do Rosário.

== Early life and education ==
Melo was born on 24 July 1958. He was born and raised in Piracanjuba, in the interior of the state of Goiás. He moved to Porto Alegre in February 1978. He is married to Valéria Leopoldino, with whom he has two children: Pablo Melo and João Arthur.

He graduated with a law degree from Unisinos.

== Political career ==
=== City councilor in Porto Alegre (2001–2012) ===
Melo became a city councilman in Porto Alegre for the first time in 2000, after he ran for four other positions, but was not elected. He was reelected in 2004 and 2008. In 2007, he was chosen to be the president of the Municipal Chamber of Porto Alegre, which he served as from 2008 to 2009.

=== Vice-mayor of Porto Alegre (2013–2016) ===
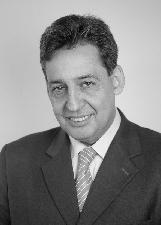
Melo in 2012.

Melo was chosen by the state PMDB branch to run as the vice-mayoral pick of José Fortunati, a member of the Democratic Labour Party (PDT) and a mayoral candidate in Porto Alegre in 2012. With Fortunati's victory in the first round, Melo became vice-mayor on 1 January 2013. He became an honorary citizen of Porto Alegre in 2016, through a chamber initiative.

=== Candidacy for mayorship of Porto Alegre in 2016 ===
In 2016, Melo was the candidate for the mayorship of PMDB, with state deputy Juliana Brizola, of the PDT, as the vice-mayoral candidate on the ticket. In the first round, they received 185,655 votes (25.93%). They came in second place behind Nelson Marchezan Júnior, and both qualified for the second round.

Melo received a diverse array of support, including from the PCdoB, the PMN, and from the PV's candidate, Marcelo Chiodo, even as his party supported Marchezan Júnior. He also positioned himself as more to the left, announcing his support for the fight against PEC 241, which established a ceiling for public spending for twenty years in Brazil, also going against the national position of his party.

Along with this, he affirmed his position against proposed laws inspired by Escola sem Partido, a conservative movement. Melo declared that he had an "identity of struggles" with the left, since he came from the "old MDB", as the party was the main political force against the military dictatorship. As a candidate, he had shown opposition against the privatization of public companies, such as DMAE, Procempa and Carris, and defended participatory budgeting.

After a tense campaign with constant trading of accusations between him and Marchezan Júnior, Melo was defeated in the second round, receiving 262,601 votos (39.50%).

After the election, on analyzing his defeat in an interview, Melo criticized the possibility that the MDB would become a part of his adversary's administration. In 2018, the party became a part of the Marchezan administration.

==== Campaign coordinator's death ====
On 17 October 2016, during his campaign for the second round, the executive-coordinator of Melo's campaign, Plínio Zalewski, was found dead at the PMDB's base of operations in the Centro Histórico neighborhood. He was one of the campaign's principal spokespersons, and would be eulogized by Melo in the wake of his death. He was buried the following day. The main hypothesis is that he died by suicide with a cold weapon. At the place where he died, a suicide letter was found. The PMDB temporarily suspended the campaign for 24 hours.

=== State deputy (2019–2021) ===
During the 2018 elections, Melo became a state deputy in the state of Rio Grande do Sul, receiving 34,881 votes.

=== Candidacy for mayor of Porto Alegre in 2020 ===
In June 2020, Melo launched his pre-candidacy to run for mayor again, bolstered by a unanimous intra-party vote. His vice-mayoral candidate was Ricardo Gomes (DEM). Other members of his coalition included Cidadania, Solidariedade, Christian Democracy, and the PRTB. Despite the PSL, the former party of former president Jair Bolsonaro, officially supporting Marchezan Júnior's reelection campaign, some deputies from the party campaigned for Melo.

In the first round, he received 200,280 votes (31%), and advanced to the second round against Manuela d'Ávila, who received 187,262 (29%). Melo received support from Gustavo Paim (PP), Valter Nagelstein (PSD), João Derly (Republicanos), and from the PSDB.

Melo was elected in the second round with 370,550 votes, or 54.63% of the vote.

==== False information and fines ====
During the elections, Jornal da Band released false polling that showed Melo in the lead against d'Ávila. Melo's campaign would later post their findings onto his Instagram account. Jornal da Band would later correct the polling data and Melo's campaign removed the post from social media. He was later condemned by electoral courts under the Brazilian Election Justice and was made to pay 106,000 reais for spreading false information. The judge that made the decision made the call to forward the case to the Federal Police for a criminal investigation. Melo and Gomes were fined again through the Election Justice for 41,900 reais for a series of irregularities in the campaign's finances, including the use of provisions to print religiously styled pamphlets that displayed him appearing alongside city council candidates from the PTB, a party that had not formally become a member of his coalition.

Allies of Melo also went around the city to spread rumors that if d'Ávila was elected, that she would close the city's churches and force people to eat dog meat.

== Mayor of Porto Alegre (2020–present) ==
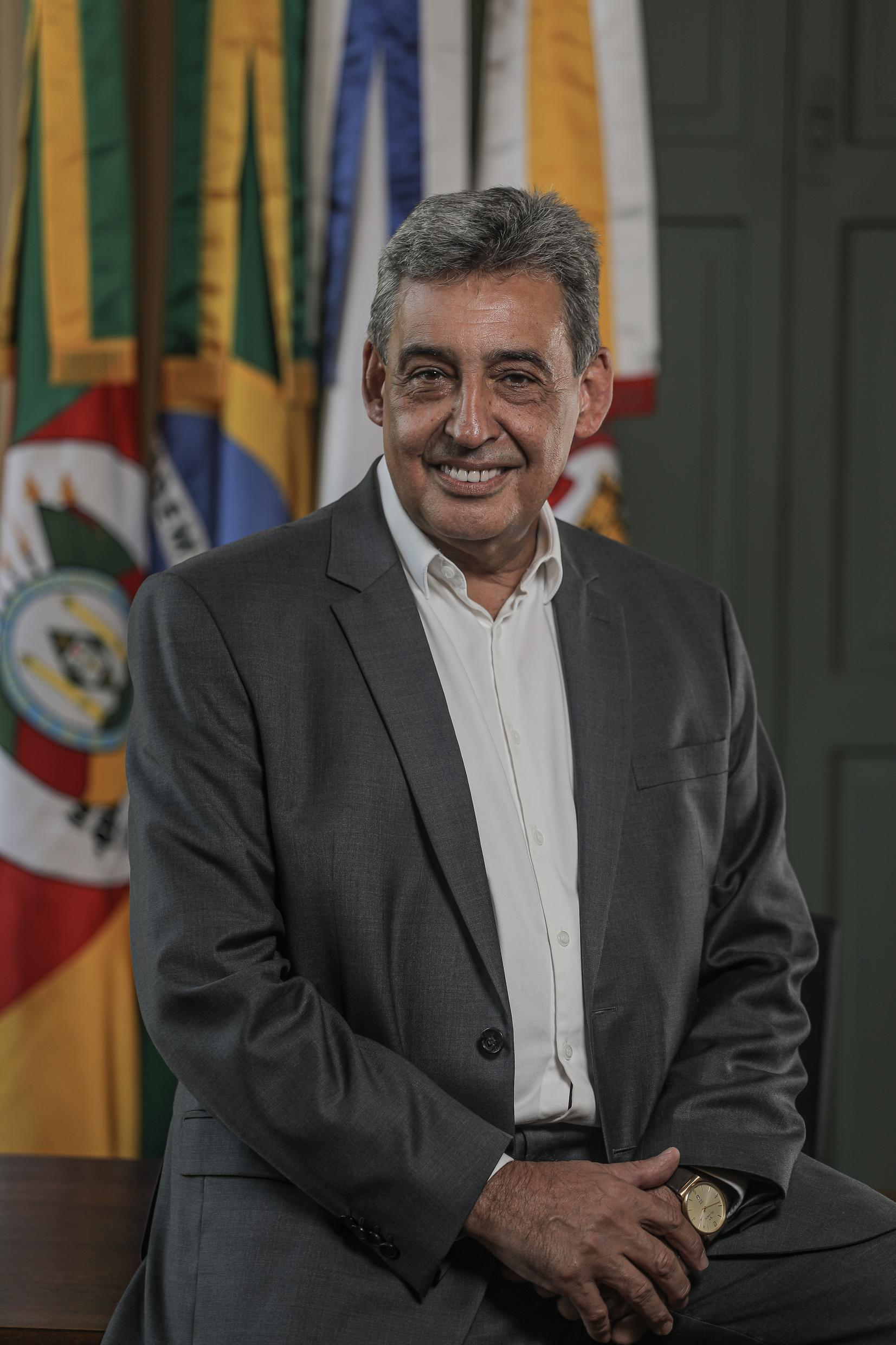
Melo's portrait from his first inauguration in 2021.

=== Transition and swearing-in ceremony ===
Melo named Porto Alegre councilman and former mayor of Santa Maria, Cezar Schirmer, as his transition coordinator for the transition between the Marchezan government and his. In his inaugural speech on 1 January 2021, Melo affirmed that was necessary to "raise the optimism" for the city, as the city, due to the COVID-19 pandemic, had been going through rough times economically and socially.

=== Management of COVID-19 Pandemic ===
==== Distribution of inefficient medicine and harms to health ====
One of the first acts under Melo's administration was to buy, among other medicines, azithromycin, ivermectin, and hydroxychloroquine and chloroquine – the latter of two which had been approved for the treatment of malaria – to supposedly combat COVID-19, despite multiple studies showing that all the medicines bought were ineffective towards treating the virus. The controversial decision was brought to suit by PSOL, which alleged that his administration was using public money to buy the medicine. The measure was also criticized by the council of the Faculty of Medicine at the Federal University of Rio Grande do Sul that asked for the immediate suspension of their distribution. Melo justified the purchase with the Ministry of Medicine by stating that people in the middle and upper-middle classes, and their friends, were taking the medicine. In total, the city government bought 239,000 reais worth of the medications, which they packaged into what they called the "COVID kit". Along with their ineffectiveness, it has been reported that the use of the medications combined over a long period and in high doses could lead to liver and renal damage, leading to the need for a liver transplant or possibly death.

In February, the Justice ministry prohibited, in a liminary decision, the city from distributing the kit. In the decision, the judge argued that the prohibition would be necessary while robust evidence, based on clinical studies and recognized by the scientific community, did not exist. Furthermore, the judge stated that the obligation of the public power, especially in health, must always be based in the preservation of the public good, and that it is not agreeable to any possibility that could create risks and turn back from the principle of precaution. The city government appealed the decision and had, by the start of March, again been denied the authorization to distribute the medicine that had already been deemed ineffective and harmful in the public sphere.

At the beginning of May, the base allied with Melo in the Municipal Chamber approved a proposal that permitted the free distribution of medication for the supposed treatment of COVID-19 that had been released by the health ministry. The project was seen as a way to attempt to circumvent the court's decision.

==== Public transit ====
The city government relaxed regulations on the use of masks on city buses, a decision contested by specialists who stated that the policy would enable the spread of COVID-19. The other measures to loosen anti-pandemic protocols were criticized by health researchers for bringing risks to public health. Ahead of the acceleration of the number of people infected, the municipal government had to return to prohibiting passengers standing on public transit on 25 February, two days before the policy was set to begin. Meanwhile, the government was not able to adapt to the restriction, and users of public transit reported waiting more than an hour and a half at stops. The city government argued that there would be more than 400 professionals taken out of work because they had contracted COVID-19 or had a family member with the virus.

==== Education ====
Even with the acceleration of the transmission of COVID-19 in the city and the increase in the occupation of beds at hospitals, Melo maintained the plan to recommence classes in municipal schools on 22 February 2021. He had only cancelled the beginning of the school year when the city had been put under the black flag category, the highest category for social distancing, due to a high risk of infections.

A part of the municipal schools would return to opening at the beginning of May, even if some of the teachers had not been vaccinated, in contrast to what had been happening in neighboring cities such as Esteio and São Leopoldo. Days before, the teachers had called for protests against returning to in-person classes during the middle of the pandemic without vaccination.

==== Collapse of the health system ====
The resurgence of the pandemic began in February 2021, after a month of relative stability in the spread of the disease. In the beginning of February, the municipal secretary of health, Mauro Sparta, had declared that "the worst has already passed", even against warnings by specialists who said that this was not true and that there was an increase in Covid cases in the state of Rio Grande do Sul. The municipality would maintain, for 45 days, softer measures to combat the spread of the virus compared to the previous administration. During the month of February, specialists and researchers had alerted e published their concerns on the risk of the municipal's health system collapsing.

On 23 February, Porto Alegre was classified again in the black flag category. However, Melo preferred to use the mechanism of "co-management", which would permit the various regions of the state to follow the standards of the prior designation that they had been classified, in this case being the red flag category. The softening of measures led to the spread of COVID-19 and also led to the overcrowding of urgent care units (UPAs) and health outposts in the city by up to 400%, alongside record numbers of those hospitalized and a line of 113 people attempting to fill vacancies at these medical centers by the end of the month. In an interview on a day with record hospitalizations, Melo asked that the people of the city contribute with their lives to save the economy of the city: "Contribute with your family, your city, your life, so that we can save the economy of the municipality of Porto Alegre." The statement generated controversy nationally and internationally.

Just a day after reaching record levels, the leader of Melo's government in the Municipal Chamber of Porto Alegre, Idenir Cecchim, accused the director of the Hospital de Clínicas of "spreading terror" in giving alerts about the overcrowding at the institution.

Ahead of the imminent collapse of the city's health system, governor Eduardo Leite decided to decree the entirety of the state of Rio Grande do Sul under the black flag category starting on 27 February, with no possibility of co-management. Melo asserted that he disagreed with Leite's decision, but would still comply. The mayor, however, continued to criticize, through social media, the more restrictive rules to slow down the spread of COVID-19 that were implemented by the state government.

On 28 February, hospital beds reached 100% capacity for the first time and still continued to rise, with the wait list for beds also increasing. The overcrowding indicated that part of the services for patients in beds would be improvised. On 2 March, Hospital Moinhos de Vento, the largest of the hospitals within private networks in Rio Grande do Sul, had to rent a container in order to store the bodies of dead patients at the hospital, since the morgue in the hospital had also reached capacity.

The collapse of the health system continued with daily records of hospitalizations in the city. In the Hospital de Clínicas, there were not enough specialized respirators. Along with this, health professionals had to choose which patients they should intubate, due to a lack of beds. Some patients went to be intubated at hospitals and would die there. At Hospital da Restinga, patients in the overcrowded emergency ward received care sitting in chairs due to the lack of stretchers. In some hospitals, some patients died in the hospital corridors due to a lack of beds.

On 5 March, the state government also announced a fine of up to 4,000 real for those who did not wear masks, in an attempt to contain the spread of COVID-19. Melo, however, declared that the city would not apply the standard, saying he would not have people abide by the decision and that the usage of prevention methods would depend on the "conscience" of people.

The municipality sought to disperse encampments at different points in the city, primarily in the Cidade Baixa neighborhood, considered a hotbed for petty crime and drug use. On the 10th and 14 March, two anti-government protests called for the reopening of local businesses and military intervention, respectively. They were held despite guidance against large gatherings. Many were reported to not be wearing masks. Soon after, they dispersed.

On 11 March, the number of people hospitalized hit a new record in Porto Alegre, with 800 people diagnosed to have COVID-19, and 43 suspected of being infected, and 187 awaiting beds. Even with this, Melo defended his administration in an interview published that day, businesses generally being open, then reduced by the state's decision to essential sectors.

Due to the large increases in the number of deaths in the city, there were lines at the public records offices to register deaths, during which there waits of up to five hours, including during the early hours of the morning. The number of burials also increased. In total, the quantity of funerals in the city in March of that year was triple of those in March the prior year. The demand for cremations increased 63% during the middle of March 2021 in comparison with the first three months of the year prior for one crematorium. In another there was a 230% increase in cremations in comparison with March the year prior. Such was the amount of beds occupied that the waiting list for beds had grown to be days long. The overcrowding hit 116% on 15 March, with 1,204 people hospitalized with only 1,036 vacant beds. The waiting list would become 1270 people. At Hospital de Pronto Socorro, ran by the city, the overcrowding of beds led to 1,075% capacity.

Various hospitals closed their emergency rooms because of the overcrowding of the units, including two of the largest in the city, Santa Casa and Clínicas. In the latter, births were limited as they had no more places in the ICU/neonatal unit. Some pregnant women in the hospitals had COVID-19, with some of them going into intensive care. Some had premature births, with them being directly sent to the ICU. Even ahead of the overcrowding of ICUs and the collapse of the health system, Melo, on 16 March, decreed his opposition to the construction of field hospitals and that it is always the case that more people could be admitted to already existing hospitals.

On 21 March, the state government published a decree to authorize the retaking of co-management. Up to that point, Porto Alegre had suffered from an overcapacity of hospital beds for three weeks. Melo immediately adopted red flag measures, including the reopening of businesses, bars and restaurants, even with the health system collapsing. Days after, he admitted to not having any scientific basis for his decision. In a public declaration, Melo said that he would not spend not even a cent in hiring new inspectors to implement the laws and confirm if the sanitary protocols have been complied with. Along with this, he reiterated that he would not implement the state decree that required the usage of masks.

On 26 March, even with hospitals dealing with overcapacity, Melo published a decree allowing for the opening of bars, restaurants, and businesses with hours that were not permitted by the state government. The measure was criticized by governor Leite, who alerted that there was an imminent shortage of sedatives for the ICUs in the capital and the moment called for people to stay indoors to avoid the spread of the virus. The state Public Ministry (MP-RS) brought forth a public civil lawsuit with the Justice against the decree, which was suspended the day after. The municipal government attempted to reimplement the decree, but the State Court of Justice maintained the suspension. The attorney general of the Public Ministry, Fabiano Dallazen, also announced that there would be an investigation into Melo's criminal responsibility and that his attitudes as mayor only generated more insecurity in the population.

==== Vaccinations ====
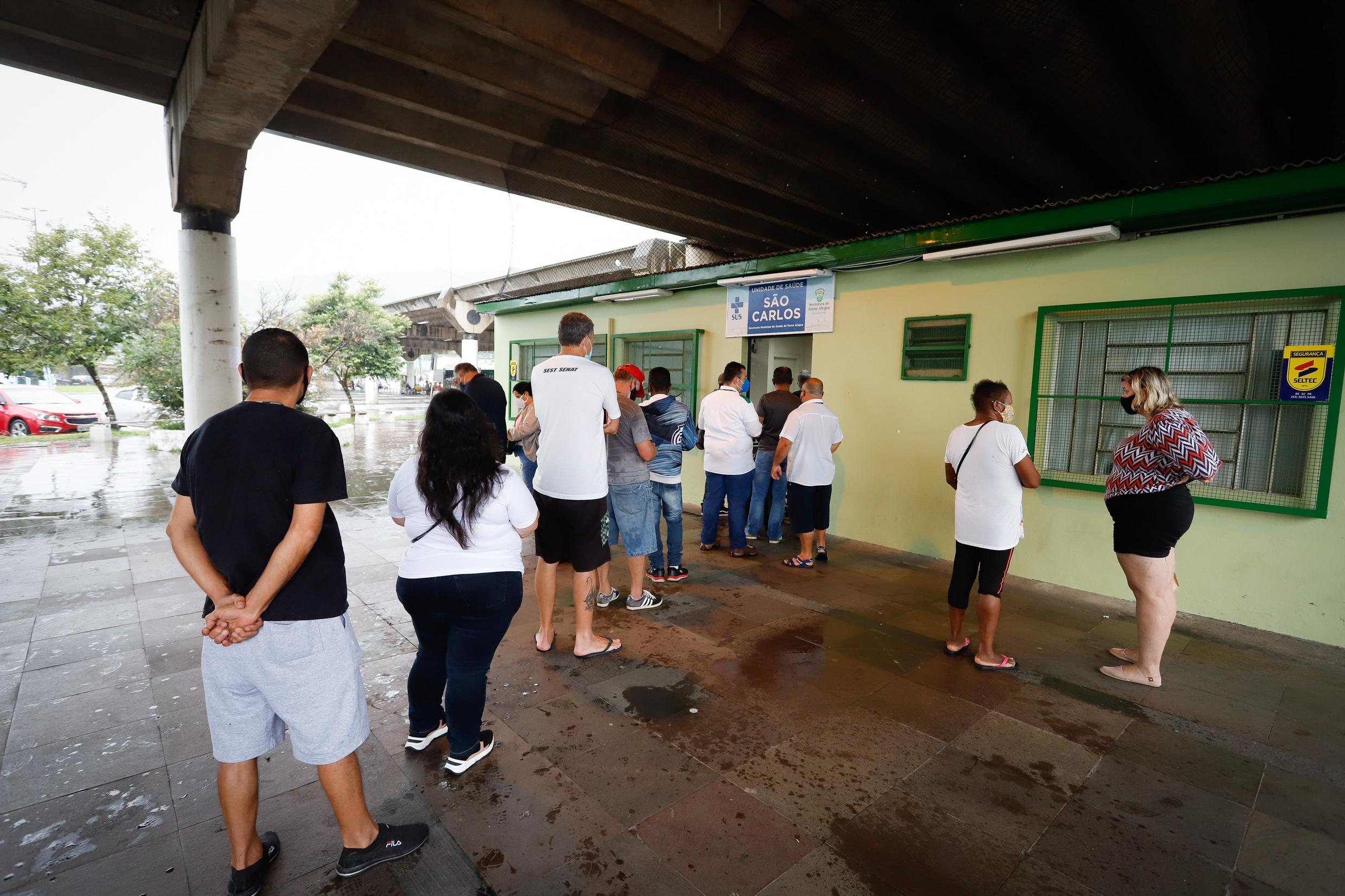
A line formed at the Unidade de Saúde São Carlos in December 2021, during the vaccination campaign in Porto Alegre.

Vaccination campaigns began in Porto Alegre on 20 January 2021. Starting in January, the municipal government began to not keep second doses of the vaccine, immediately using up all of the supplies that they received from the Programa Nacional de Imunizações (PNI). This created delays in second doses by the end of April and the beginning of May, when there was a further delay in the sending out of doses of CoronaVac throughout Brazil. Long lines formed as a result of people waiting for the vaccine, but there were not enough doses to go around, implying that there were people who were immunized during a period longer than the four weeks recommended by the manufacturers. Melo recorded a video, which was released on social media, apologizing to the populace for the delays and claiming that the Ministry of Health was responsible for the error. Upon receiving the supplies of the Pfizer/BioNTech vaccine, the municipal government decided to keep the shots to be able to give a second dose, to avoid the same issue that occurred with the CoronaVac vaccines.

In March, the Consortium of the Association of Municipalities of the Porto Alegre Metropolitan Region (Granpal), integrated by Porto Alegre's city government, made a proposal to buy doses of the Sputnik V vaccine that would be meant for, by law, the PNI. The purchase, however, did not go forward.

=== Municipal secretaries ===
Melo increased the number of secretaries from 15 to 19 through administrative reforms approved during his first month in government. Among the most well-known names included Cezar Schirmer, the former mayor of Santa Maria, Luiz Fernando Zachia, former director of Detran-RS, Ana Pelini, former state secretary of the environment, and Cássio Trogildo, former president of the Municipal Chamber of Porto Alegre who had been barred from office by the TSE. Along with the aforementioned, the daughter of federal deputy Bibo Nunes, Camila Nunes, was named to be the adjunct-secretary of Administration and Assets after negotiations managed by her father. With the nominations for secretaries, Pablo Melo, the son of Sebastião Melo and the first substitute from the MDB's bank, became a councilman. Rodrigo Lorenzoni, the son of then minister Onyx Lorenzoni, was also named as one of his secretaries.

=== Education ===
Melo named, soon into his first term, Janaína Audino, who had previously worked with the Fundação Maurício Sirotsky Sobrinho, of Grupo RBS, as the municipality secretary of education.

In April 2021, Melo announced that he would not construct more daycares to buy spaces in private school systems. The following month, the municipal government announced that the Escola Leocádia Felizardo Prestes would be the first school in the municipal school system to adhere to the civic-military school program put forth by the federal government. However, the school administration pushed back against the municipal policy, stating that they would never adhere to the program.

=== Public assets ===
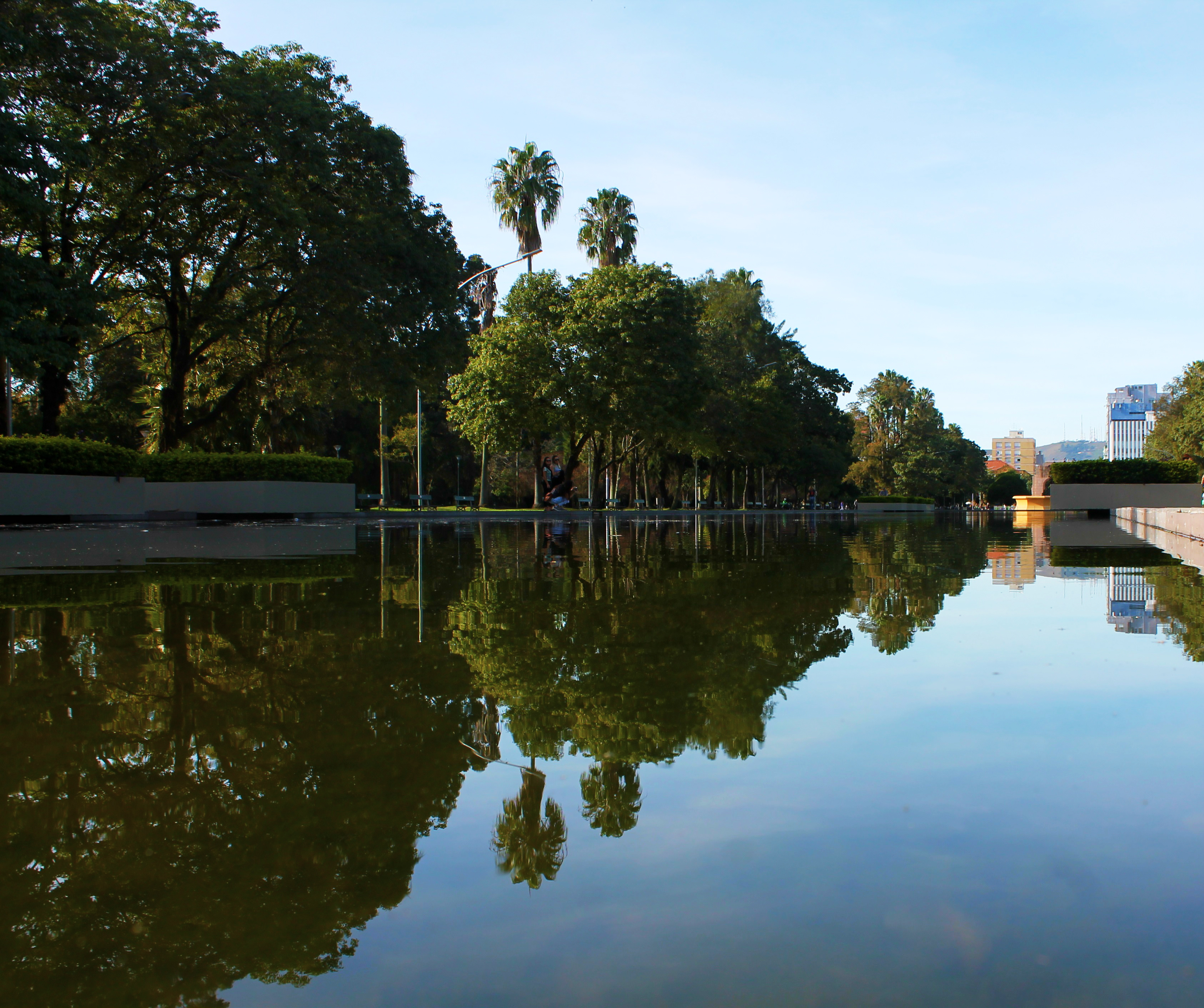
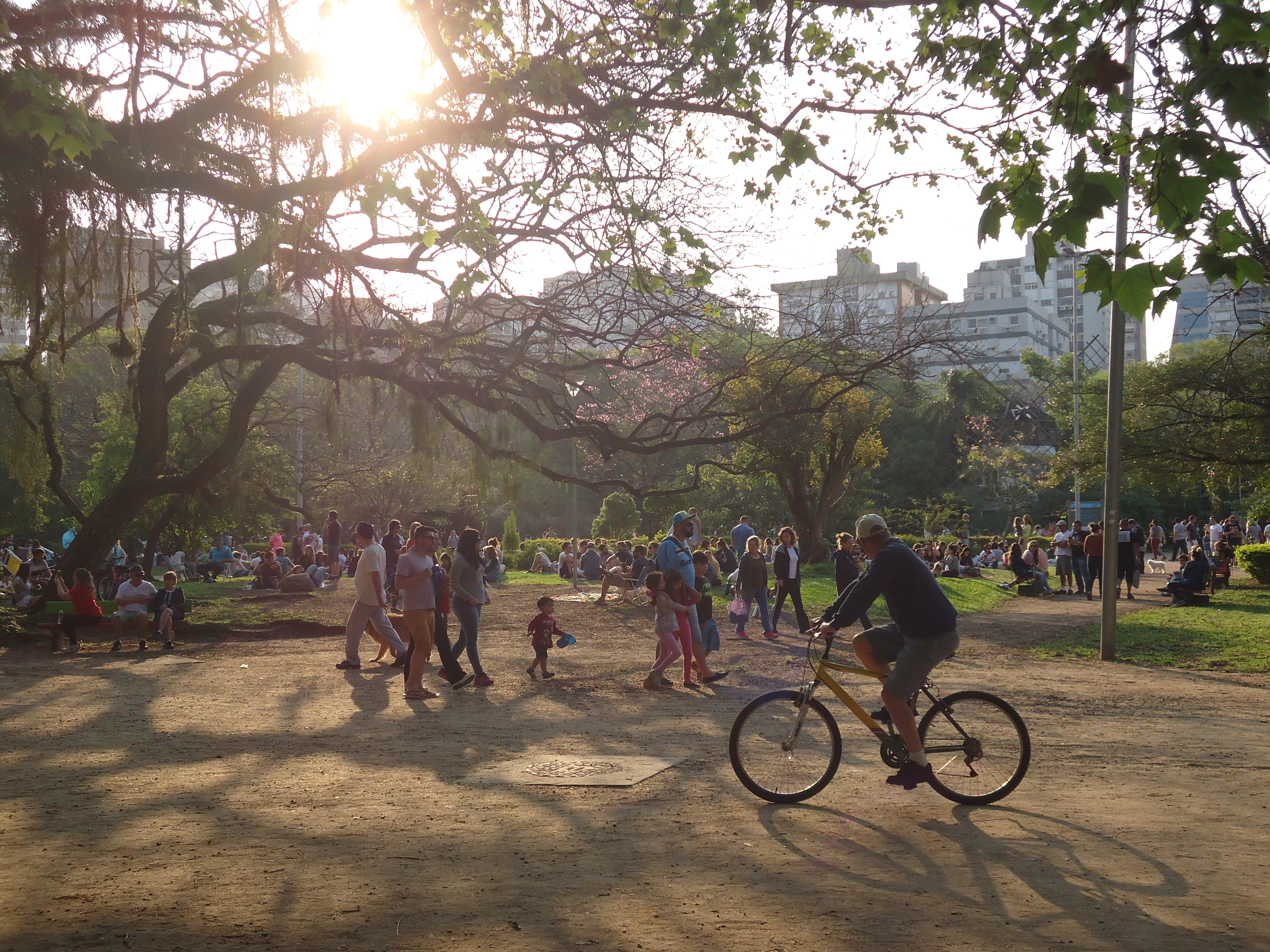
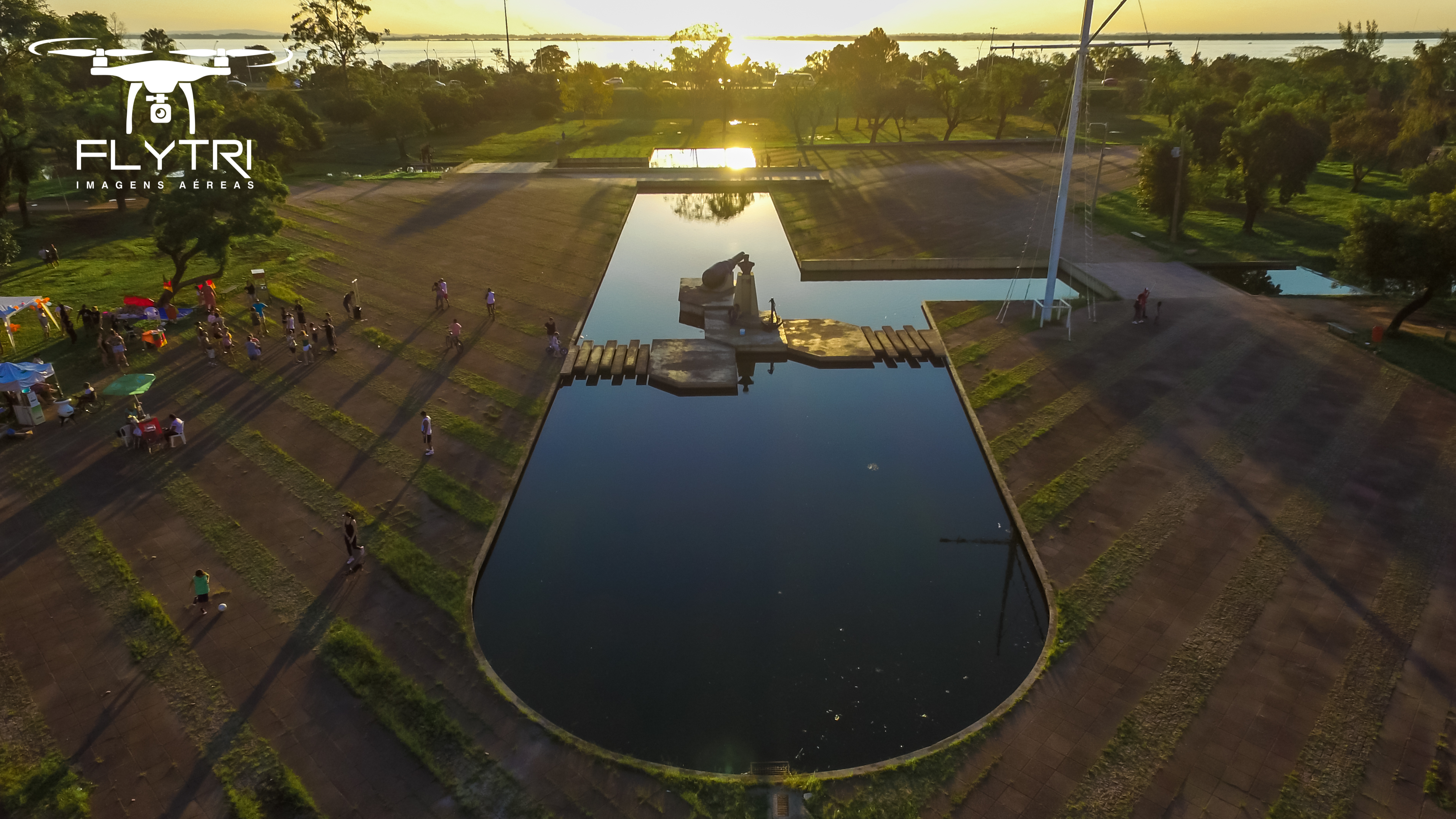
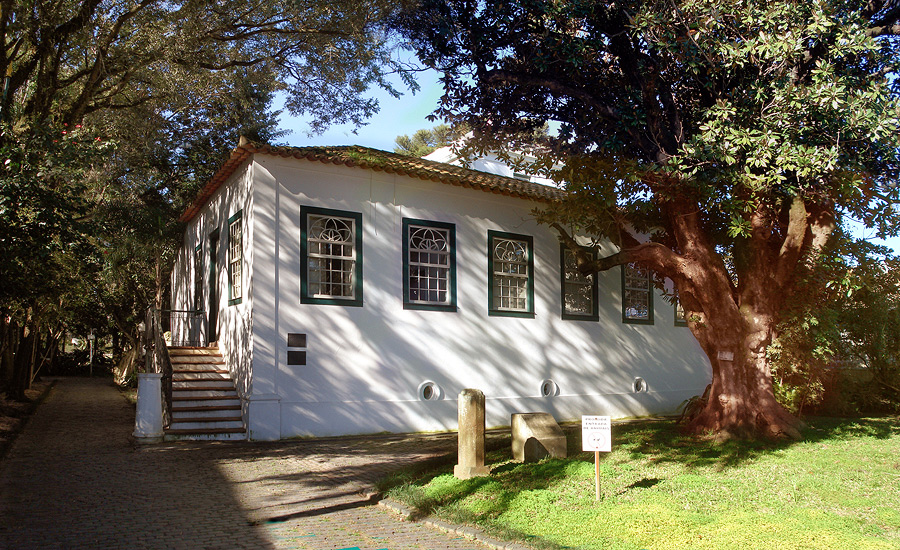
From top-left, going clockwise:
- Farroupilha Park;
- Moinhos de Vento Park;
- Joaquim Felizardo Museum of Porto Alegre;
- Marinha do Brasil Park;

Melo's government also became known for his large-scale program of the concession of programs and public spaces to private initiatives, saying that the privatization program "is in the DNA" of his government. It was put forth that the municipality did not have the conditions to maintain these services adequately and that the partnerships would bring qualified individuals to the system and health benefits for the population. During his electoral campaign, he declared that services should be public, but backed up by private partnerships.

Places for the dispersion of the equipment included Auditório Araújo Viana, Teatro de Câmara Túlio Piva, Parque da Harmonia, and stretch 1 of the Orla do Guaíba, some of them completing a process started during the previous administration. They had expected new concessions at Farroupilha, Moinhos de Vento and Marinha do Brasil parks; from stretches 2 and 3 of the Orla do Guaíba; Hospital de Pronto Socorro and Hospital Materno-Infantil Presidente Vargas; the Usina do Gasômetro; with garbage collection and water and sewage treatment; green areas in the surrounding areas of the Aeromóvel and the area around the Joaquim Felizardo Museum of Porto Alegre. The public transport company Carris was privatized, with its assets being sold.

The program came to be criticized for devaluing the public character of services and spaces, and to allow them to be exploited commercially, along with the program's proposals having little transparency and without the necessary dialogue with the community. The government is also accused of scrapping public assets to justify its concession afterwards.

The Public Servants' Union of Porto Alegre strongly criticized his government's decision, stating that he had demonstrated a strong adherence to Bolsonaro's politics and stated that he assumed the posture of repression and violence against movements and struggles, taken away rights and reduced access to public politics, created unemployment, and promoted the scrapping of public equipment to justify the surrendering of public assets to private initiatives. The Coletivo Preserva Redenção, among the many organizations that had protested against his program, published an open letter stating that Melo had passed over public assets in the city, privatized public spaces and had aligned with business interests and real estate speculation at the cost of the environment and the well-being of Porto Alegre's residents. The Sindicato dos Previdenciários of Rio Grande do Sul, meanwhile, published a note stating that public servants only could lose with privatization and that they imposed privatization on institutions that guaranteed health, leisure, culture, and transport.

According to Luciano Fedozzi, a professor at the Federal University of Rio Grande do Sul (UFRGS) and a member of Observatório das Metrópoles, the concession or privatization of services are deceivingly presented by public authorities as inevitable and the only possible way to eliminate issues. Meanwhile, independent specialists and the community had in fact offered many alternatives to privatization. He described the moves as part of an idea of Porto Alegre as a marketplace and that it ought to be sold internationally as something that could be transformed into new possibilities for the accumulation of capital and mercantilism. Rafael Passos, president of the Rio Grande do Sul branch of the Institute of Architects of Brazil (IAB), is on a mission to decentralize and that the only public comment to them is how it would be done. Even debates such as these are limited as complaints from the populace of not being heard grow common.

For Betânia Alfonsin, from the Conselho Diretivo do Instituto Brasileiro de Direito Urbanístico, the concession process for parks should not be analyzed in a vacuum since it forms part of the global context of the advance of private interests towards public areas, with a movement that seeks total deregulation of urbanist legislation. In January 2022, Melo promoted to send to the Chamber of Deputies a new master plan administrator who was "very liberal". While this did not occur, he tried to introduce new regulations. He has said that his government is very liberal on the economy, on entrepreneurs, and on the opening of new businesses, but has a strong eye on social issues. There are criticisms that his government has implemented large-scale projects that had been approved despite warnings from the master plan administrator and norms regarding environmental protections. For André Augustin, from the Observatório das Metrópoles, the privatization program is associated with policies that selectively value certain areas of the city for large real estate and urbanist ventures, there being a strong state-wide initiative to build a city that creates profits for predetermined sectors.

=== Response to 2024 floods ===
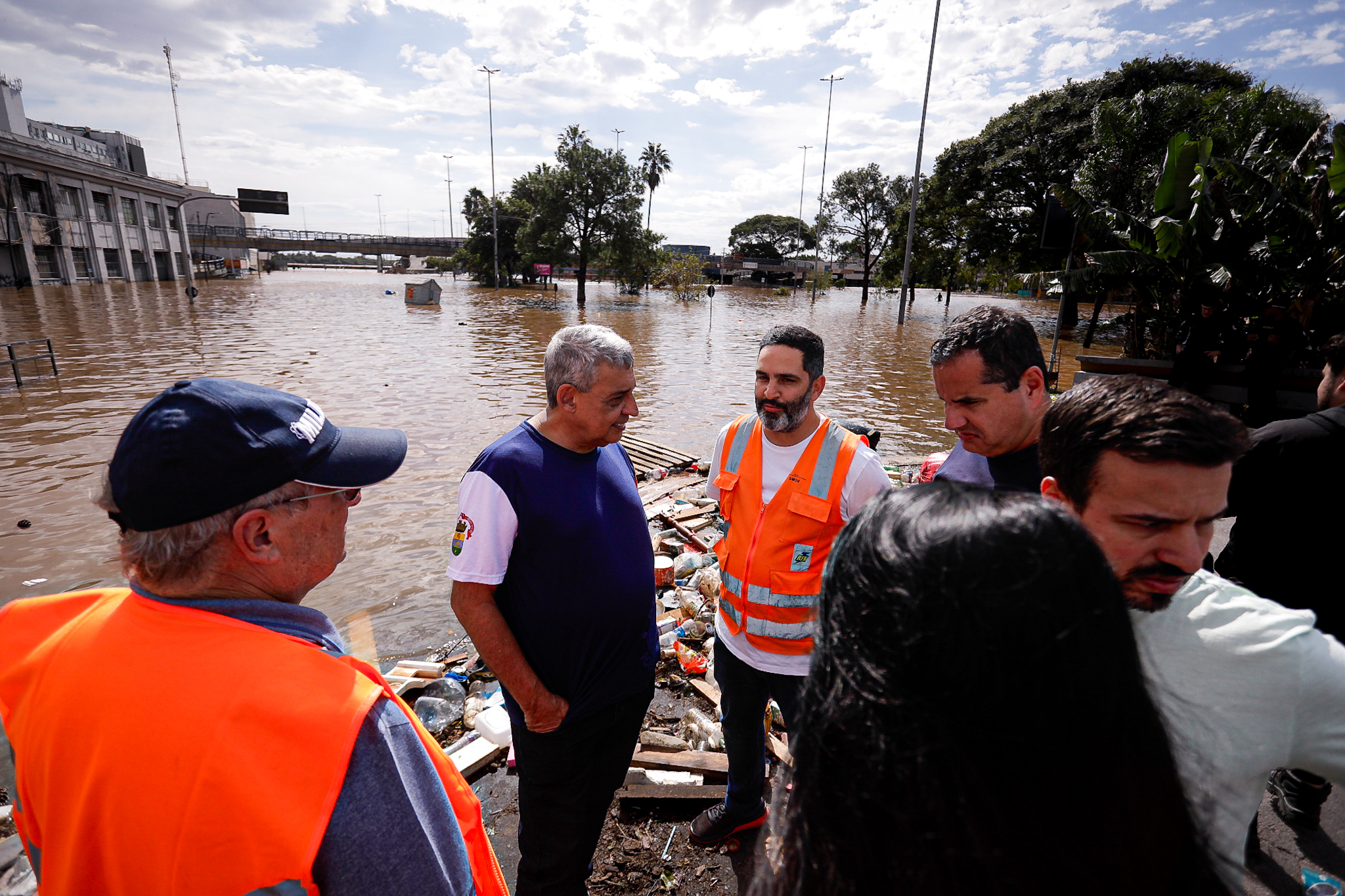
Melo with an emergency crew creating plans for alternative routes to access Porto Alegre during the floods.

From April to May 2024, Rio Grande do Sul was hit by massive flooding, which also severely hit Porto Alegre. This was partly seen as, in addition to the sheer amount of precipitation, insufficient pumping of water, as trash and rubble had blocked many manholes in the city. Melo, during the flooding, affirmed that the city government knew that there was a possibility of strong rains and was not taken by surprise. He denied, however, that the city government had delayed its response and put the responsibility on the new round of floodings for the high volume, as well as the population, blaming them for the trash strewn throughout the city.

During the floods, the Guaíba hit its highest ever historical level, leaving various parts of the city submerged and many people stranded. Due to the severity of the situation, the municipality set up 21 centers to receive thousands of people who were forced to leave their homes.

The flooding was also marked by conflicts between Melo and the federal government, during which he criticized what he saw was the lack of support from them, despite having also delayed a formal emergency request for days. During this period, federal deputy Fernanda Melchionna and city councilman Roberto Robaina, both from PSOL, sued Melo. They both requested that the State Attorney's Office to start an investigation against Melo due to the fact that the municipal government had not sent the federal government the data of families in Porto Alegre hit by the floods. As a result, they were unable to receive the first payments from the Auxílio Reconstrução fund, valued at $5.1 million real.

In June, fears of floods began to worry the people of Porto Alegre, causing thousands to abandon their homes. Porto Alegre only was able to have the "pump houses" - buildings that housed the electric tools necessary to drain floods in the city - functioning again by the start of July.

=== Censorship of graffiti critical of Melo ===
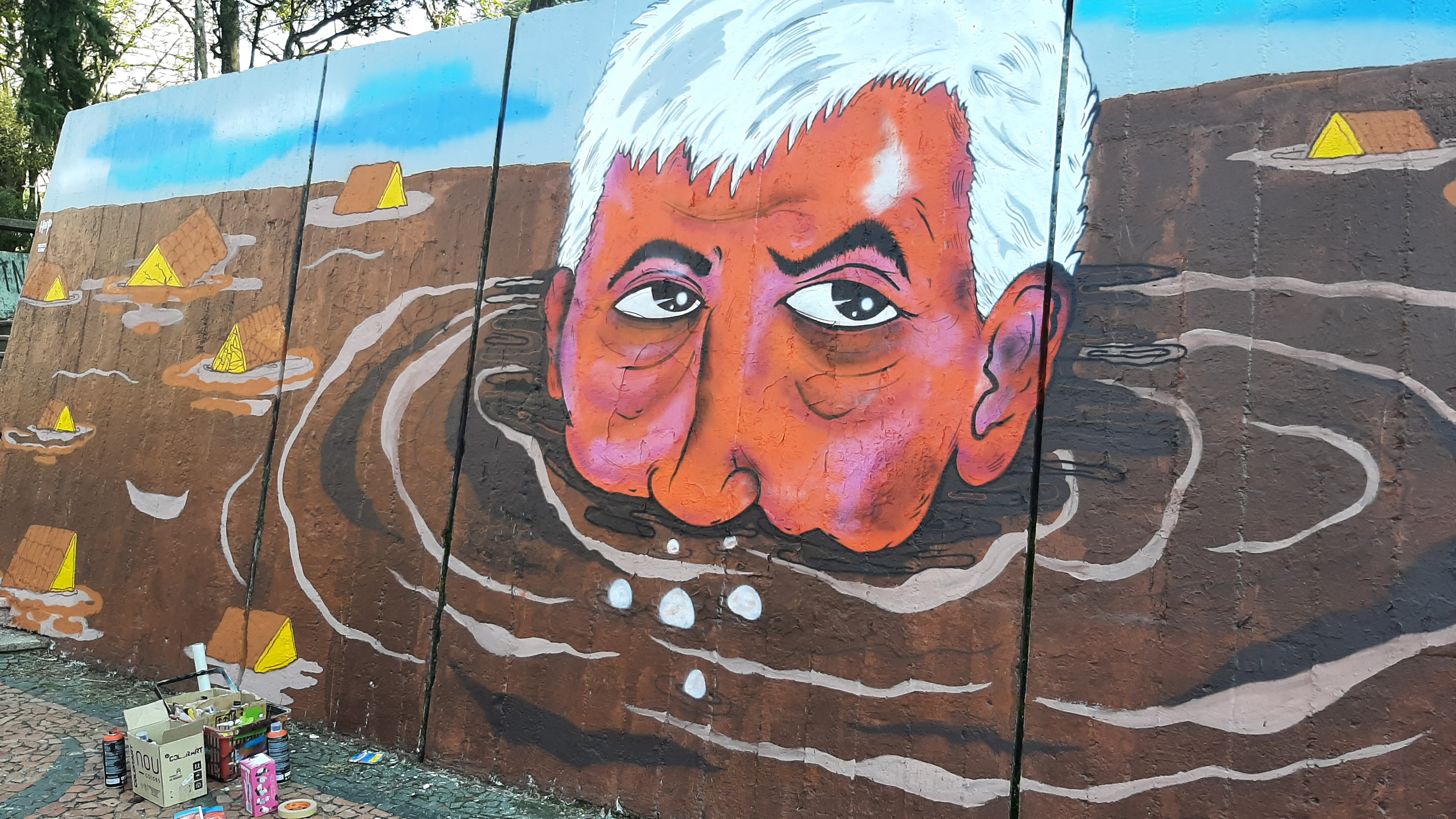
The mural, Chimelo, that was the subject of legal action in 2024.

During his 2024 reelection campaign, the Electoral Courts permitted the removal of graffiti that portrayed Melo, partially submerged by flooding. The mural, dubbed Chimelo, was made by the artist Filipe Harp, and was based on an illustration by Bruno Ortiz Monllor. Chimelo was sprayed onto the wall of a cultural center in the Cidade Baixa neighborhood. In a decision rendered on 15 August, Judge Patrícia Hochheim Thomé judged that the panel had been framed as electoral propaganda in the locality or loosely covered by legislation. She ruled that the mural be removed within 24 hours, or be faced with a fine of $5,000 real in case of insubordination, and was rapidly covered up.

In September of that year, however, the state Regional Electoral Court (TRE) reauthorized the reproduction of the mural. The art was understood by the Public Electoral Ministry (MPE) was to be interpreted and treated as elaborate art by a citizen who was not running as a candidate. Desembargador Nilton Tavares da Silva agreed with the notion and voted for the mural's authorization. The decision was supported by the court in a unanimous decision.

=== Reelection and Second Term (2024–present) ===
Melo was reelected in 2024 by a wide margin, obtaining 61.53% in the second round. He defeated his second-place rival, Maria do Rosário, who had obtained 38.47% of the vote.

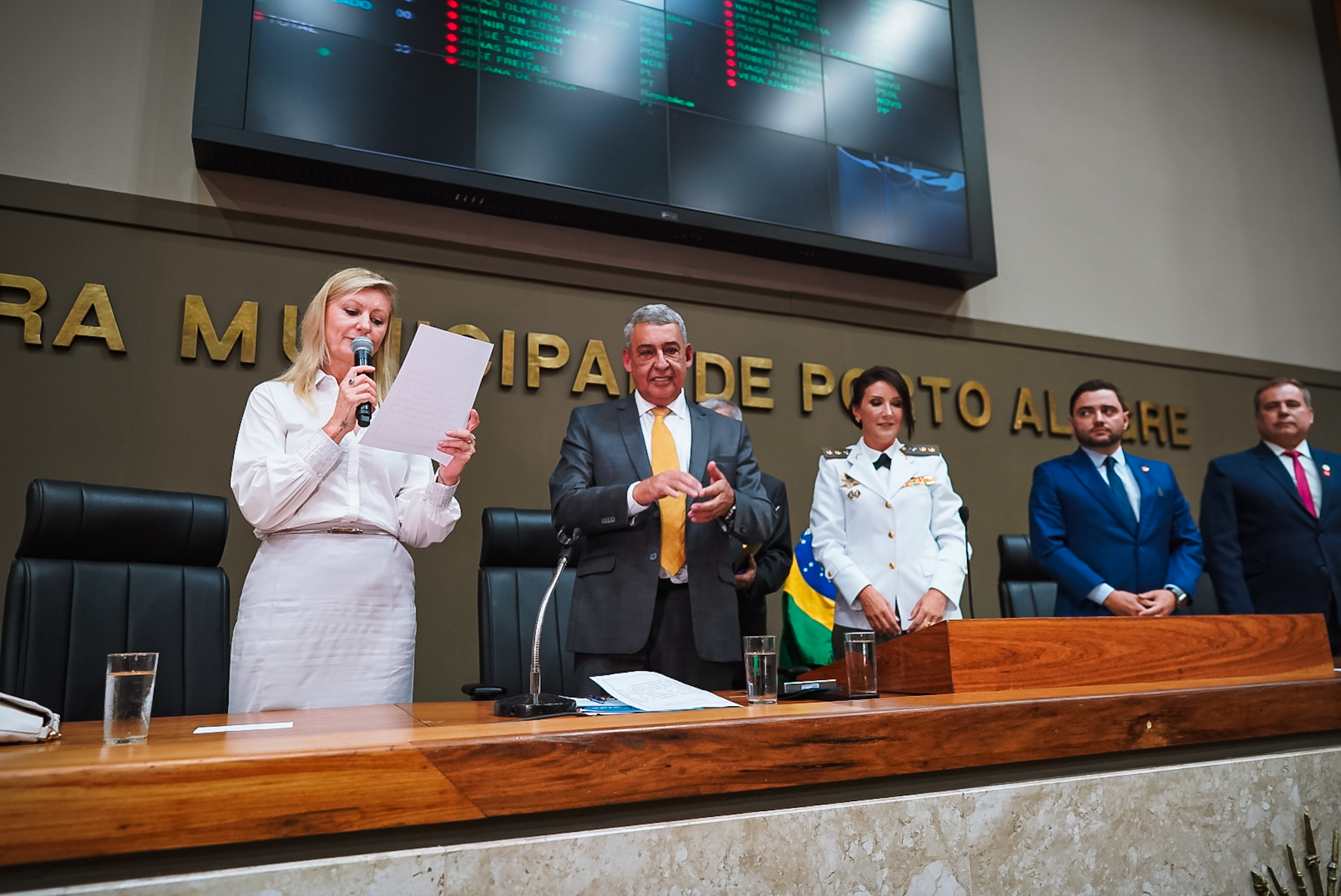
Melo and Betina Worm, his vice-mayor, during their swearing-in ceremony in 2025.

==== Management of future flooding ====
The floodings from earlier in the year became an issue during the course of his reelection campaign in 2024. After he was questioned about the subject, Melo mentioned that "it will continue to flood". According to him, the situation would depend on drainage systems, but the budget did not cover projects to protect against flooding, and the new investment of $4.5 billion real would depend on the creation of a partnership with the Municipal Department of Water and Sewage (DMAE). During the same time period, strong rains affected the city, leaving the city without lights and transport, also affecting the swearing in of municipal secretaries, which had to be cancelled after the rain took out the lights. Former minister of president Lula da Silva, Paulo Pimenta, criticized Melo for his stance on the issue, claiming that he was responsible for the new bouts of flooding in Porto Alegre.

==== Swearing-in ceremony controversy ====
On 1 January 2025, Melo and his vice-mayor, Betina Worm of the Liberal Party (PL), took office during the swearing-in ceremony of the Municipal Chamber of Porto Alegre as the city council members were also sworn in. Melo generated controversy by stating that "defenders of the Brazilian military dictatorship should not be prosecuted because this would represent freedom of expression", and also affirmed that "defenders of socialism and communism do not deserve to be punished." Opposition parties would go on to publicly protest against Melo for these comments.

==== Administrative reform ====
On his first day working in his office in 2025, Melo made protocol for seven proposed laws seeking administrative reforms, including for the privatization of DMAE. The Rio Grande do Sul State Supreme Court, responding to a request by the Municipal Workers Union of Porto Alegre (Simpa), sent out a preliminary notice to suspend part of the processing of part of the reforms, which ruled that legal norms were not followed, such as public debate on the proposals.
