= Dercy =

Dercy may refer to:

- Dercy, Aisne, a commune in the Aisne département, France
- Dercy Furtado (1927–2024), Brazilian politician
- Dercy Gonçalves (1907–2008), Brazilian actress, comedian, and singer
