= Felipe Camozzato =

Brazilian politician (born 1988)

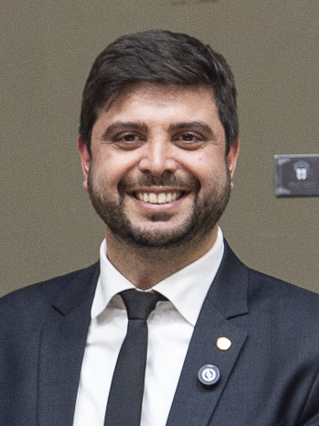
- Camozzato in 2026

Member-elect of the Chamber of Deputies
- Assuming office 1 February 2027
- Constituency: Rio Grande do Sul

Member of the Legislative Assembly of Rio Grande do Sul
- Incumbent
- Assumed office 1 February 2023
- Constituency: At-large

Member of the Municipal Chamber of Porto Alegre
- In office 1 January 2017 – 1 February 2023
- Constituency: At-large

Personal details
- Born: Felipe Zortéa Camozzato; 9 January 1988 (age 38) Nova Bassano, Rio Grande do Sul, Brazil
- Party: NOVO (since 2015)

Felipe Zortéa Camozzato (born 9 January 1988) is a Brazilian politician serving as a member of the Legislative Assembly of Rio Grande do Sul since 2023. From 2017 to 2023, he was a member of the Municipal Chamber of Porto Alegre.
