= Moinhos de Vento =

- Bairro
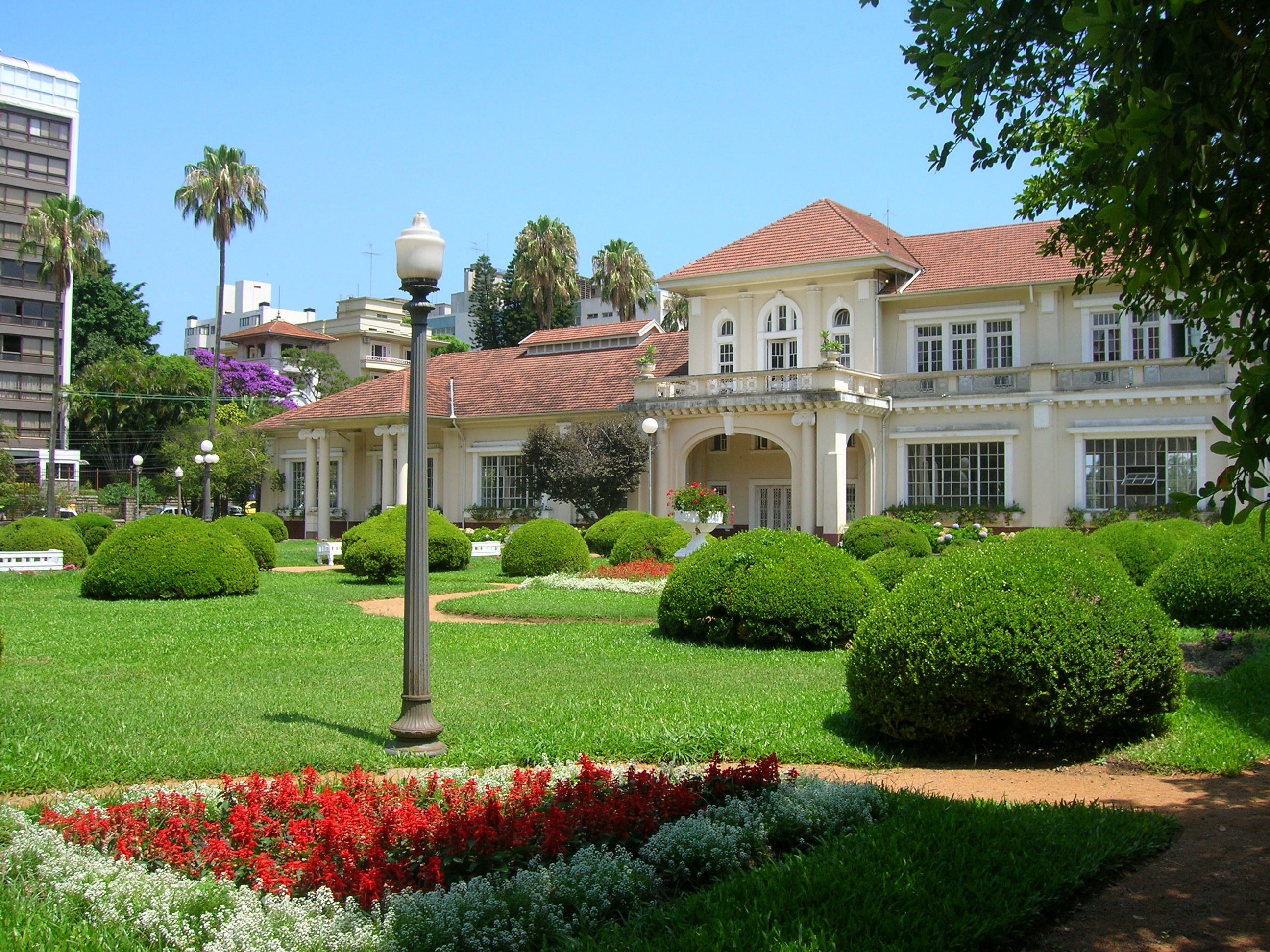
- The Hidráulica Moinhos de Vento and its gardens

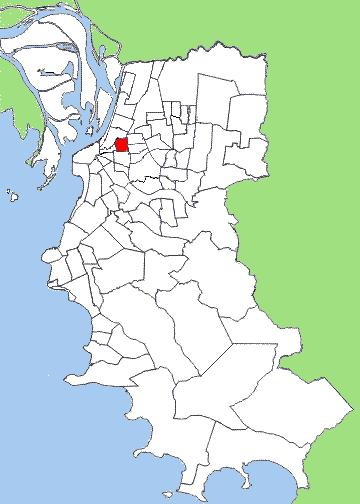
- Moinhos de Vento within Porto Alegre
- Coordinates: 30°01′25″S 51°12′08″W
- Country: Brazil
- State: Rio Grande do Sul
- City: Porto Alegre

Moinhos de Vento (literally Windmills in English) is a neighbourhood of the city of Porto Alegre, the state capital of Rio Grande do Sul in Brazil. It was created by the law number 2022 of December 7, 1959.

Moinhos de Vento got its name because Azorean immigrant families built their windmills in its area during the 18th century. Around that time wheat production was an important economic enterprise in the then-village of Nossa Senhora de Madre de Deus, nowadays called Porto Alegre.

In 1893, tramcars led to the development of Moinhos de Vento, where affluent and traditional families built their homes. Many of them were businessmen, industrial and political personalities, not only local, but from the whole state.

In 1894, the Independência hippodrome was built there and horse racings became very popular until the arrival of football. After the hippodrome was transferred to another neighborhood, the Moinhos de Vento Park (aka Parcão) was inaugurated in its place.

Still an affluent and upper middle class area of Porto Alegre, Moinhos de Vento is well-served by bars, restaurants and luxury stores.

Also there is located a highly regarded and traditional private school of the city, the Nossa Senhora do Bom Conselho school, well known as the Bom Conselho.

Concerning children's education, Moinhos de Vento has two private kindergartens, the Lar do Bebê-Pupileira and Gente Miúda schools.
