= Jessé Sangalli =

Brazilian politician (born 1987)

- Sangalli in 2025

Member-elect of the Chamber of Deputies
- Assuming office 1 February 2027
- Constituency: Rio Grande do Sul

Member of the Municipal Chamber of Porto Alegre
- Incumbent
- Assumed office 1 January 2021
- Constituency: At-large

Member of the Municipal Chamber of Viamão
- In office 1 January 2017 – 1 January 2021
- Constituency: At-large

Personal details
- Born: Jessé Sangalli de Mello; 1 October 1987 (age 39) Porto Alegre, Rio Grande do Sul, Brazil
- Party: PL (2024–present)
- Other political affiliations: PSDB (2016–2020); Cidadania (2020–2024)

Jessé Sangalli de Mello (born 1 October 1987) is a Brazilian politician who was elected member of the Chamber of Deputies in 2026. He has been a member of the Municipal Chamber of Porto Alegre since 2021. From 2017 to 2020, he was a member of the Municipal Chamber of Viamão.
