= Any Machado Ortiz =

Brazilian politician and lawyer

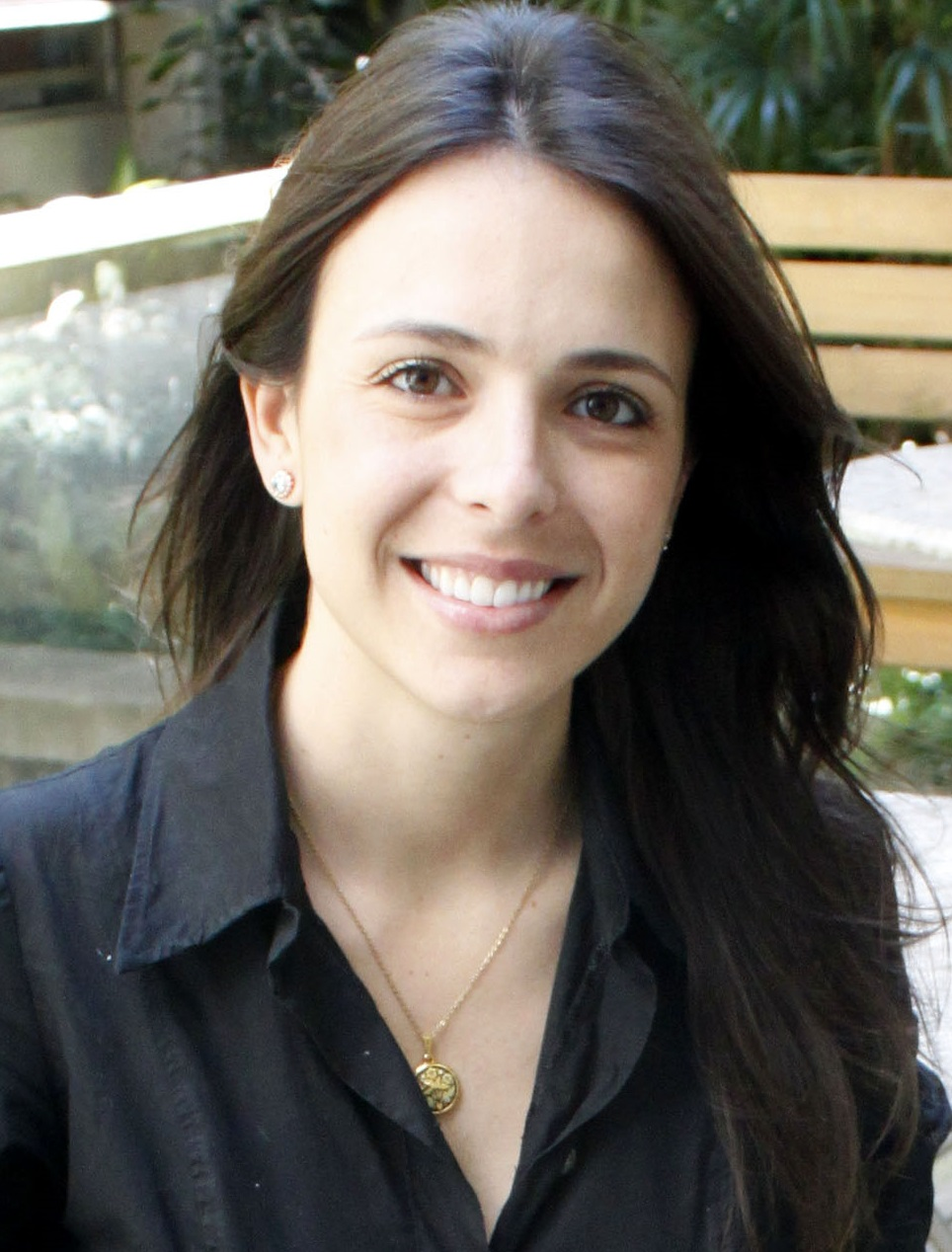

State Deputy in Rio Grande do Sul
- Incumbent
- Assumed office 2014

Personal details
- Born: October 19, 1983 (age 43) Canoas, Rio Grande do Sul

Any Machado Ortiz is a Brazilian politician and lawyer.

She was elected to the Legislative Assembly of Rio Grande do Sul as a state deputy in 2014 and re-elected in 2018.
