= Moinhos de Vento Park =

Park in Porto Alegre, Brazil

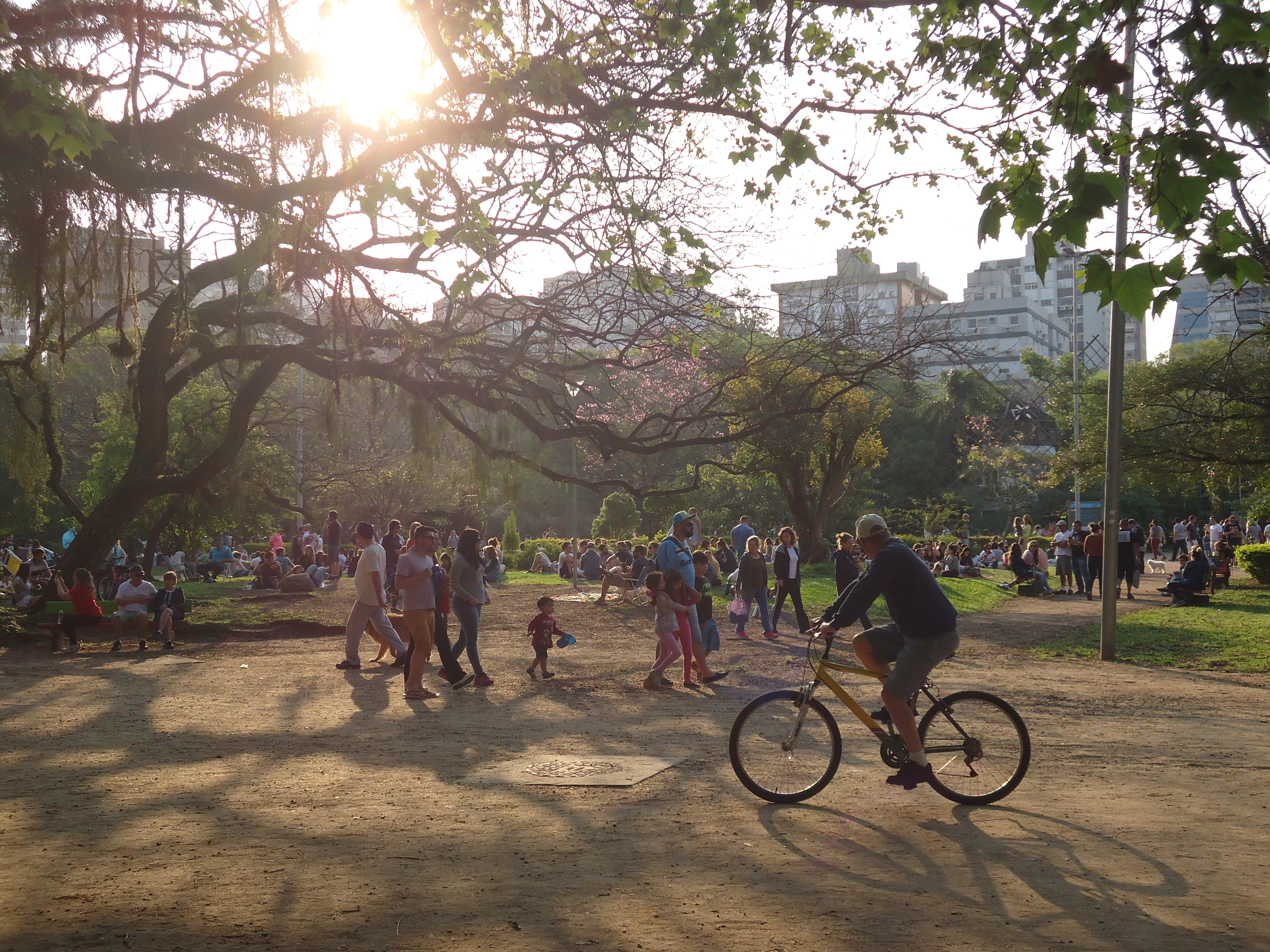
- The park on a Sunday afternoon
- Interactive map of Moinhos de Vento Park
- Type: Urban park
- Location: Moinhos de Vento, Porto Alegre
- Coordinates: 30°01′39″S 51°12′03″W
- Area: 11.50 hectares (0.1150 km^{2})
- Created: November 9, 1972; 53 years ago
- Status: Open all year

Moinhos de Vento Park (Portuguese: Parque Moinhos de Vento, literally "Windmills Park"), popularly known as Parcão (literally "Big Park"), is a well-known park in Porto Alegre. It is located in the Moinhos de Vento neighborhood.

The park structure consists of soccer, tennis and volleyball fields, gym equipment, a playground, a kids library, a pond with fish, turtles and ducks, a playground, and a replica of an Azorean windmill. The park also features a monument commemorating Castelo Branco.
