= Maria do Rosário =

Brazilian politician (born 1966)

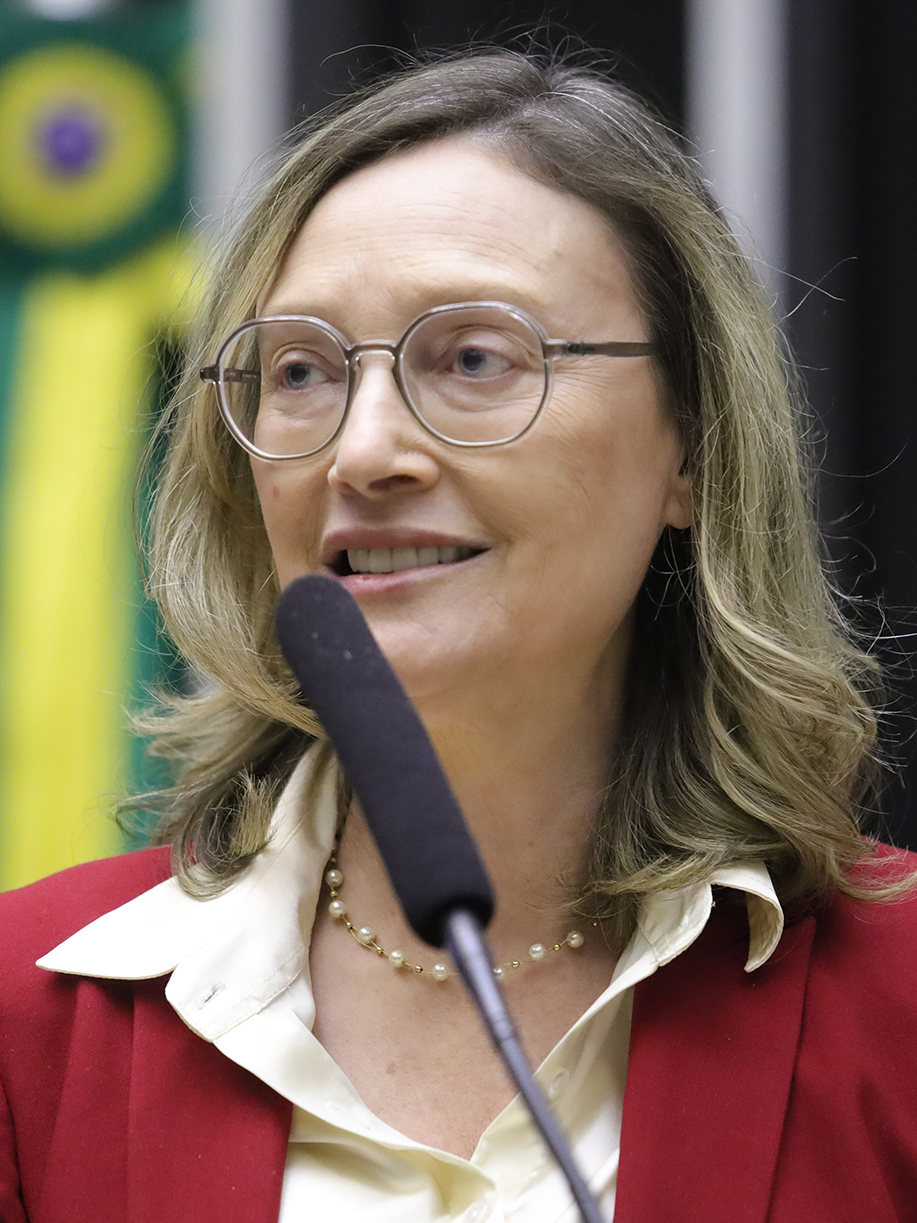
- Maria do Rosário in 2024

Member of the Chamber of Deputies
- Incumbent
- Assumed office 1 February 2003
- Constituency: Rio Grande do Sul

Minister of Human Rights
- In office 1 January 2011 – 1 April 2014
- President: Dilma Rousseff
- Preceded by: Paulo Vannuchi
- Succeeded by: Ideli Salvatti

Member of the Legislative Assembly of Rio Grande do Sul
- In office 1 February 1999 – 1 February 2003
- Constituency: At-large

Member of the Municipal Chamber of Porto Alegre
- In office 1 January 1993 – 1 February 1999
- Constituency: At-large

Personal details
- Born: Maria do Rosário Nunes; 22 November 1966 (age 59) Veranópolis, Rio Grande do Sul, Brazil
- Party: PT (1993–present)
- Other political affiliations: PCdoB (1989–1992)
- Education: Federal University of Rio Grande do Sul
- Website: www.mariadorosario.com.br

Maria do Rosário Nunes (born 22 November 1966) is a Brazilian teacher and politician. She graduated in pedagogy from the Federal University of Rio Grande do Sul, and took a postgraduate degree at the University of São Paulo. From 2011 to 2014, she served as the Secretary for Human Rights under the Rousseff administration. With the exception of her three-year tenure as Human Rights Secretary, she has been a congresswoman since 2003, representing the southern Brazilian state of Rio Grande do Sul as a member of the Worker's Party.

== Early life and education ==
Maria do Rosário Nunes was born on 22 November 1966 in the municipality of Veranópolis. In her youth she was an active member of the student movement. Later, as a teacher in public schools, Maria do Rosário became active in the trade union movement. A graduate teacher, she took a postgraduate degree in domestic violence at the Laboratory for Child Studies of the University of São Paulo.

== Career ==
Maria do Rosário was elected, as a member of the Communist Party of Brazil, to the Porto Alegre City Council for the 1993-1996 term with 7,555 votes. The year after her inauguration, she switched to the Workers' Party. In 1996 she was re-elected with over 20,000 votes, the top-voted councillor that year. During her two terms as councilwoman, Maria do Rosário acted as president of the education and human rights committees. Her second term at the Porto Alegre City Council was interrupted when she was elected to the Legislative Assembly of Rio Grande do Sul with over 77,000 votes in 1998. That year, she became the second top voted state deputy of Rio Grande do Sul. As a state deputy, she acted as chairwoman of the citizenship and human rights committee and vice-president of the Legislative Assembly for two years.

At the next election Maria do Rosário was elected to the Chamber of Deputies with over 140,000 votes. She was re-elected in 2006 with 110,000 votes. In the National Congress she served as the rapporteur of the Parliamentary Commission of Inquiry which investigated people responsible for sexual exploitation of children. Maria do Rosário represented the Chamber in the Commission on Political Deaths and Disappearances during the military dictatorship and acted as chairwoman of the Special Committee for the Adoption Bill. In 2003 she became coordinator of the Parliamentary Front in Defense of Children's Rights, in addition to serving as vice-chairwoman of the human rights and education committees. In 2009 she was the chairwoman of the education committee, having coordinated a series of debates about the new National Education Plan, which sets the goals for the area for the period from 2011 to 2020.

In 2004 Maria do Rosário was an unsuccessful candidate for deputy mayor on the ticket headed by fellow party member Raul Pont. In 2008 she was a mayoral candidate, losing to incumbent mayor José Fogaça. She was the Workers' Party's vice-president from 2005 to 2007.

She was re-elected for a third term in 2010, after resolving legal issues relating to her 2008 campaign.

On 8 December 2010 President-elect Dilma Rousseff appointed Maria do Rosário to succeed Paulo Vannuchi as head of the Secretariat of the Presidency of the Republic for Human Rights, a ministerial-level cabinet office. Although she did not indicate priorities, the press points the battle against homophobia and the establishment of truth and reconciliation commissions to investigate the crimes perpetrated by public office holders during the dictatorship among her top priorities. She was also expected to work for the Brazilian government to fulfill the verdict of the Inter-American Court of Human Rights against the country's amnesty law.

Political offices
Preceded by Paulo Vanucchi	Minister of Human Rights; 2011–2014	Succeeded by Ideli Salvatti
Preceded by Odair Cunha	Second Secretary of the Chamber of Deputies; 2023–present	Incumbent
