= Dercy Furtado =

Brazilian politician

Member of the Legislative Assembly of Rio Grande do Sul
- In office 31 January 1975 – 1986

Member of the Municipal Chamber of Porto Alegre
- In office 1973–1974

Personal details
- Born: Dercy Therezinha Vieira; 22 September 1927 Morungava district, Gravataí, Rio Grande do Sul, Brazil
- Died: 21 July 2024 (aged 96) Porto Alegre, Rio Grande do Sul, Brazil
- Party: ARENA (1972–1978); PDS (1978–1985); PDT (from 1985)
- Spouse: Jorge Alberto Jacobus Furtado (died 1999)
- Children: 6, including Jorge Furtado

Dercy Therezinha Vieira Furtado (22 September 1927 – 21 July 2024) was a Brazilian politician, women's rights activist, and television commentator. In 1972, Furtado was the first woman elected to the Municipal Chamber of Porto Alegre. She resigned from city council in 1974 when she was elected to the Legislative Assembly of Rio Grande do Sul, the third woman to serve there. Furtado served three terms in the Legislative Assembly from 1975 to 1986, and was noted for her commitment to women's rights, family planning, the rights of housewives and domestic workers, and women's right to work at night.

== Early life ==
Furtado was born Dercy Therezinha Vieira on 22 September 1927 in the Morungava district of Gravataí, Rio Grande do Sul, one of five children of a poor farmworker family. Her family moved to Porto Alegre in 1934, where her father, Melíbio Fernandes Vieira, found employment as a hotel cook, while her mother, Etelvina Silveira Vieira, left her job as a teacher to take care of the family's children.

Furtado dropped out of school when she was 14 years old to work at the Geyer Laboratory making glass ampoules. She returned to school and enrolled at SENAI (National Service for Industrial Training) at the age of 17. There, she met her future husband, her Portuguese teacher Jorge Alberto Jacobus Furtado, and the couple married three years later. They had six children: Jorge (a filmmaker), Cláudio, Sérgio, Nina (a psychiatrist), Maria da Graça (a journalist), and Thais (a professor at the Federal University of Rio Grande do Sul).

Furtado's experience raising her own children, and the subordinate role of women in Brazilian society, prompted her to become involved in community and women's rights issues and, eventually, elected politics. She began volunteering in various community and social assistance programs through the Catholic Church. Much of her community work focused on the rights of domestic workers such as maids, and on family planning. She also sought to expand the rights of working women and housewives, a priority she continued to champion throughout her political career.

== Political career ==
Telmo Thompson Flores, who was the mayor of Porto Alegre and had noticed her work on social and community issues, invited Furtado to run for a seat in the Municipal Chamber of Porto Alegre in the 1972 election, on the National Renewal Alliance (ARENA) ticket. She received 10,108 votes, making her the first woman elected to the municipal council. (Prior to Furtado's election, one other woman, Julieta Battistioli, had taken over a seat that became vacant in the 1940s, but she was an alternative member and not directly elected.)

Porto Alegre's council term was from 1973 until 1977, but Furtado resigned her municipal seat when she was elected to the Legislative Assembly of Rio Grande do Sul. She was elected on 16 November 1974 as an ARENA candidate, the third woman to serve in the state legislature. Suely Gomes de Oliveira and Terezinha Irigaray, its first and second elected female deputies respectively, had left office before Furtado's inauguration, leaving her as the only woman in the Legislative Assembly during her first term. She served in the 44th legislature from 1975 to 1979, switched to the then newly formed (and now defunct) Democratic Social Party (PDS), and won re-election to second and third terms in 1978 and 1982.

Furtado was a vocal women's rights activist in the legislature during the height of the military dictatorship in Brazil. During the 1970s, she fought to remove a statute that required the state's female civil servants to wear skirts at work. An update to the civil service dress code in the 1980s allowed women to wear pants.

In 1977, Furtado released a book containing twelve petitions and proposals aimed at improving women's rights in Brazil, called Cortando as Amarras (Cutting the Bonds), and presented it to the Federal Senate. In it she called for retirement benefits for housewives, abolition of proof of virginity from the Brazilian Civil Code's requirements for marriage annulment, the right of women to work at night, and the creation of new housing and dormitory options for female students at Brazilian universities. Some of Furtado's petitions were implemented slowly; for example, the virginity test for annulments was removed from Brazil's civil code in 2001.

Furtado's fight to allow Brazilian women to work at night came after discussions with female pharmacists in the state of Bahia who wanted the option to work after dark; this led her to take the proposal to the national Minister of Labor and Social Security, Arnaldo da Costa Prieto. In a 2008 interview, Furtado pointed out that she herself had not been allowed to work at night under the 1970s policies.

Furtado became a nationally known figure for women's rights. She received multiple invitations from the then governor of Paraná, Jayme Canet Júnior, to speak with women's groups in his state. She became a regular speaker across Brazil, including talks in Belém, Manaus, and the banks of the Rio Negro in the Amazon basin. Furtado also travelled to the United States to present a guest lecture in Virginia on women's rights and family planning issues in her native Brazil.

In August 1985, while serving her third term in the state legislature, Furtado left the Democratic Social Party (PDS) and joined the Democratic Labour Party (PDT) at the invitation of Rio de Janeiro Governor Leonel Brizola. She sought re-election in 1986 under the PDT ticket, but did not win a fourth term. Despite not being re-elected, Furtado did not regret having switched political parties.

== Later life ==
Furtado appeared as an on-camera television commentator at RBS TV and RBS TV Porto Alegre while in office and afterwards, including current affairs and news programs hosted by Maurício Sirotsky Sobrinho and Tânia Carvalho, up to three times per week.

Furtado enrolled in a degree program at the age of 70, and received a bachelor's degree in history when she was 74. In an interview conducted when she was 80, Furtado noted that she had stayed very active during her older years to stay physically and mentally sharp. She read and traveled frequently, including vacations to Santa Catarina, and practiced gymnastics three times per week.

In 2017, the Municipal Chamber of Porto Alegre released a short film focusing on her life. In 2020, Furtado expressed happiness to see eleven women elected to the 36-seat Municipal Chamber of Porto Alegre, the most in history, and something she had not believed would happen in her lifetime.

Dercy Furtado died at her home in Porto Alegre early on Sunday, 21 July 2024, at the age of 96. She is buried in the Jardim da Paz Cemetery in Porto Alegre.
