= Municipal Chamber of Porto Alegre =

Municipal Chamber of Porto Alegre Câmara Municipal de Porto Alegre
- 18th Legislature

Type
- Type: Unicameral
- Term limits: None

History
- Founded: September 6, 1773

Leadership
- President: Hamilton Sossmeier, PRD since January 2, 2023
- Government Leader: Idenir Cecchim, MDB
- Opposition Leader: Roberto Robaina, PSOL

Structure
- Seats: 36
- Political groups: Government (22) PSDB (4) MDB (3) PRD (3) PP (3) PL (2) Republicanos (2) Cidadania (1) PSD (1) PSB (1) Solidariedade (1) UNIÃO (1) Non-aligned (4) PDT (2) NOVO (2) Opposition (10) PT (4) PSOL (4) PCdoB (2)
- Length of term: 4 years

Elections
- Voting system: Open list proportional representation
- Last election: November 15, 2020
- Next election: October 6, 2024

Meeting place
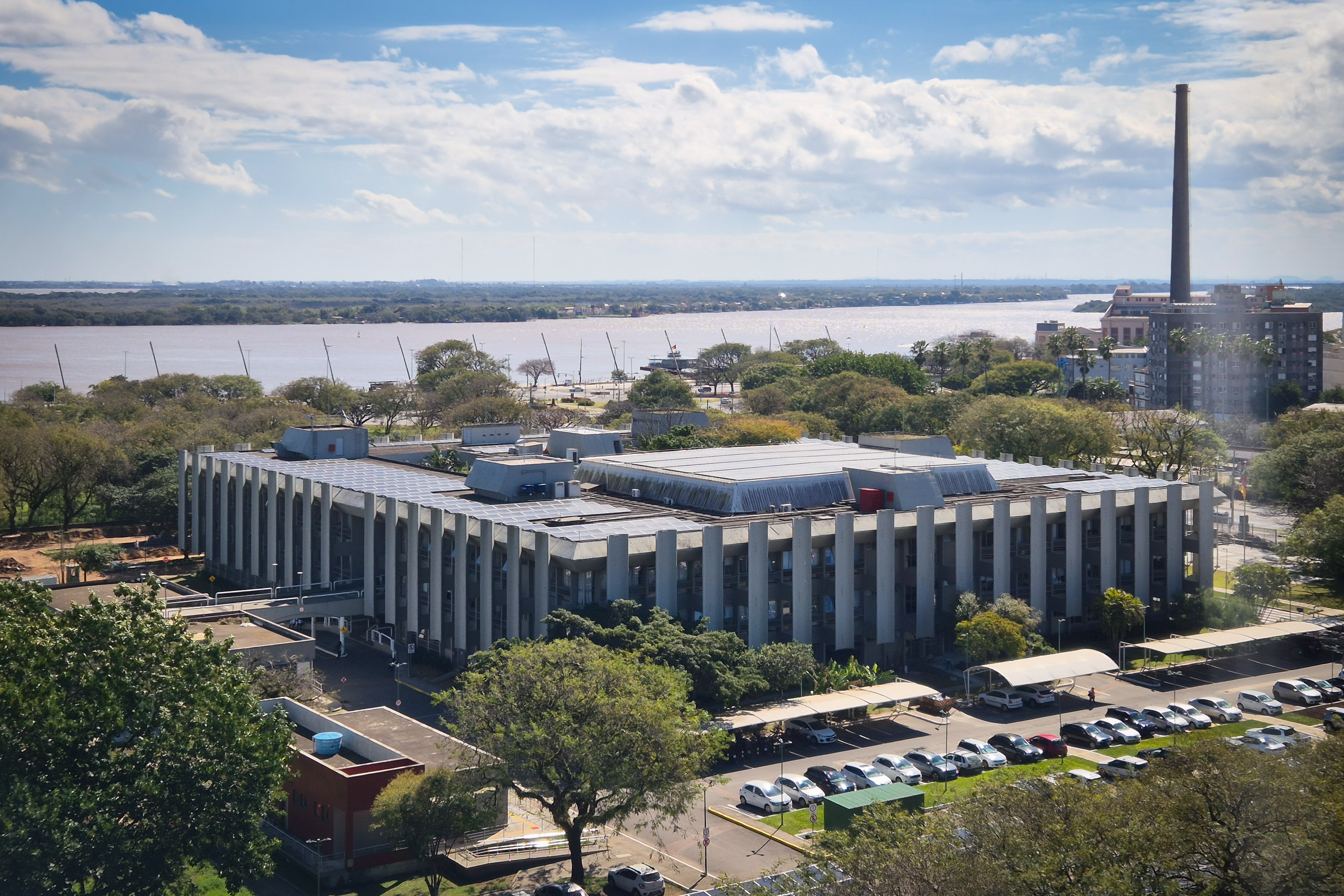
- Aloísio Filho Palace

Website
- www.camarapoa.rs.gov.br

The Porto Alegre City Council is the Legislative branch of Porto Alegre. It is composed of 36 councilors who are elected by an open list election. The Council serves as a balance of power against the mayor, as Porto Alegre has a strong mayor-council type of government. Porto Alegre City Council oversees all Executive agencies, departments, and audits municipal public accounts. It has sole authority to decide if Mayor or Deputy Mayor may leave Porto Alegre for a period longer than five days. The Council also approves the Budget Bill. There is no term limit.

Current Speaker of the Council is Humberto Goulart (PDT). There also are following offices: First Deputy Speaker, Luiz Braz (PSDB); Second Deputy Speaker, Margarete Moraes (PT); First Secretary of the Council, Haroldo de Souza (PMDB); Second Secretary, Elias Nunes Vidal (PPS); and Third Secretary, Valdir Caetano da Silva (PL). Current Majority Leader is Clênia Maranhão, PPS.

There are six committees overseeing several subjects of the city. Committee membership is defined by party breakdown. Members of committees are assigned by party leaders. Committees generally meet in the morning, as afternoons are reserved to floor sessions.

== History ==
The very first City Council meeting was on September 6, 1773, when members of the Viamão Council met in the Vila de Nossa Senhora da Madre de Deus de Porto Alegre, former name of Porto Alegre, ordered by then-governor José Marcelino de Figueiredo. Members of the first Porto Alegre City Council were Domingos Moreira (Speaker), Manoel Velloso Tavares, Domingos Gomes Ribeiro, José Alves Velludo, and Ventura Pereira Maciel. In the early years, the City Council had both judicial and legislative powers.

In 1828, there had been a major change the way City Council was set up. Porto Alegre had 10,000 inhabitants, and 400 voters, who elected the new nine-member City Council. Under the rule of the Empire of Brazil, there was no mayor-like office, and activities of City Council were scrutinized by the Provincial Assembly. At that time, City Council had attributions that today are mayor's ones, like public works, police services, and tax collection. In 1864, it had begun the building of the first Council Hall in an open lot between Rua da Ponte (currently Riachuelo Street) and Pedro II Square (currently Marshall Deodoro Square). This building was destroyed by fire on November 19, 1949 and the lot is now the seat of Rio Grande do Sul Court of Justice. 1873 was the year of the centennial and the members of Council were João Carlos Augusto Bordini, Joaquim Francisco Dutra Júnior, João Rodrigues Fagundes, Antônio Manuel Fernandes, Luís da Silva Flores Filho, João Pinto da Fonseca Guimarães, José Martins de Lima, Manuel Soares Lisboa and, Firmínio Martins de Oliveira Prates.

By the deposition of monarchy, there were 8 councilmen: João Antunes da Cunha Neto (speaker), Felicíssimo Manoel de Azevedo, Bibiano Dias de Castro, João da Mata Coelho, José Domingos da Costa, Antônio da Azevedo Lima, Guilherme Shell and, Rafael Gonçalves Ventura. After enactment of the Brazilian Constitution of 1891, City Council was responsible of auditing municipal public accounts, analyzing budget bills and, tax-related matters. At this time, there had been no opposition within City Council, as the PRP dominated state's political scene. The first oppositionist ever elected was a member of defunct Federalist Party in 1916. When Getúlio Vargas took over the rule in 1930, all city councils in Brazil were closed. Only in 1934, the city councils were re-opened. During this time, City Council was made up of 11 councilmen with annual sessions no longer than two months. This structure lasted until 1937, when that City Council was replaced by a Technical Administration Council.

In 1947, a new State Constitution was signed into law and City Council was authorized to have 21 members; these members now started out receiving monthly income paid up by city treasury, this led to increase of middle class representation. Between 1947 and 1949, Council sessions are hosted in today's City Hall. In 1949, City Council moved into José Mountary Building. When the military staged a coup in 1964, multi-party system was abolished, being replaced by a two-party system.

In 1972, Dercy Furtado became the first woman elected to the Municipal Chamber of Porto Alegre. She served in the Porto Alegre city council from 1973 until late 1974, when she resigned from the municipal chamber following her election to the Legislative Assembly of Rio Grande do Sul.

In 1988, a new Brazilian Constitution was enacted, granting powers to cities but, creating a rigid form of government for cities; in this constitution cities are federative units, unlike former constitutions that granted states full rights to legislate over municipal forms of government.

== Membership to City Council ==
As of October 13, 2026, these are the members of Porto Alegre City Council. Councilmen are sorted out by amount of votes in the last election.

Councilperson	Party	Committee membership	Amount of Votes
Jesse Sangali	PL	Education, Culture and Youth Affairs	22.966
Karen Santos	Psol	Consumer and Human Rights	20.207
Comandante Nádia	PL	Constitution and Justice	18.010
Ramiro Rosário	NOVO	Consumer and Human Rights	16.450
Grazi Oliveira	Psol	Health and Environment	14.321
Giovane Byl	Podemos	Constitution and Justice	12.115
Pedro Ruas	Psol	Speaker of the Council	12.070
Roberto Robaina	Psol	Urbanization, Transportation, and Housing	10.033
Moises Barboza Maluco do Bem	Psdb	Urbanization, Transportation, and Housing	8.603
Jonas Reis	PT	Economy, Treasure, Budget, and Mercosur	8.235
Gilvani o Gringo	Republicanos	Constitution and Justice	7.891
Marcelo Bernardi	PSDB	Education, Culture, and Youth Affairs	7.759
Tiago Albrecht	Novo	Constitution and Justice	7.615
Alexandre Bublitz	PT	Education, Culture, and Youth Affairs	7.144
Gilson Padeiro	PSDB	Urbanization, Transportation, and Housing	7.070
Fernanda Barth	PL	Economy, Treasure, Budget, and Mercosur	7.063
José Freitas	Republicanos	Health and Environment	6.746
Marcos Felipi	Cidadania	Health and Environment	6.618
Mariana Lescano	Progressistas	Economy, Treasure, Budget, and Mercosur	6.389
Claudia Araujo	PSD	Urbanization, Transportation, and Housing	6.321
Marcio Bins Ely	PDT	Constitution and Justice	6.296
Tanise Sabino	MDB	Health and Environment	6.270
Juliana De Souza	PT	Education, Culture, and Youth Affairs	6.261
Rafael Fleck	MDB	Economy, Treasure, Budget, and Mercosur	5.908
Vera Armando	Progressistas	Health and Environment	5.693
Mauro Pinheiro	Progressistas	Constitution and Justice	5.661
Erick Dênil	PCdoB	Constitution and Justice	5.376
Professor Vitorino	MDB	Consumer and Human Rights	5.315
Giovani Culau E Coletivo	PCdoB	Education, Culture, and Youth Affairs	4.902
Aldacir Oliboni	PT	Health and Environment	4.869
Natasha Ferreira	PT	Consumer and Human Rights	4.718
Carlos Carotenuto	Republicanos	Economy, Treasure, Budget, and Mercosur	4.644
Atena Roveda	Psol	Consumer and Human Rights	4.260
Idenir Cecchim	MDB	Committee on Consumer and Human Rights	?
Hamilton Sossmeier	Podemos	Urbanization, Transportation, and Housing	4.053
Coronel Ustra	PL	Urbanization, Transportation, and Housing	2.669

== Committees of City Council ==
There are six committees with jurisdiction all over municipal affairs. Committee's works are regulated by the Porto Alegre City Charter (Chapter V, Section III) and the Porto Alegre City Council Rules of Procedure (Title II, Chapter II).

=== Committee on Constitution and Justice ===
Committee on Constitution and Justice (CCJ) oversees legal status before the City Charter of every bill in the Council. This committee drafts final versions of every bill in the Council before being voted in the floor. CCJ has an appellate jurisdiction on decisions of the Speaker and its deputies. Ibsen Valls Pinheiro (PMDB) is the Committee Chairman and Paulo Odone Ribeiro (PPS) is the Deputy Committee Chairman. Membership to CCJ:

Councilperson	Party
Jessé Sangalli	PL
Ramiro Rosário	Novo
Alexandre Bublitz	PT
Gilson Padeiro	PSDB
Márcio Bins Ely	PDT
Mauro Pinheiro	Progressistas
Roberto Robaina	Psol

=== Committee on Economy, Treasure, Budget, and Mercosur ===
Committee on Economy, Treasure, Budget, and Mercosur (CEFOR) oversees tax, economy and, budget affairs. CEFOR has sole authority to oversee public spendings as defined by budget bill. CEFOR drafts final versions of Budget, appropriation bills. Maristela Meneghetti (DEM) is the Committee Chairwoman and Adeli Sell (PT) is the Deputy Committee Chairman. Membership to CEFOR:

Councilperson	Party
Thiago Albrecht	Novo
Giovani Culau	PCdoB
Fernanda Barth	PL
Giovane Byl	Podemos
Karen Santos	Psol

=== Committee on Urbanization, Transportation, and Housing ===
Committee on Urbanization, Transportation, and Housing (CUTHAB) has jurisdiction on street, places naming, public works, municipal assets allocation, public transportation and, related affairs. Elói Francisco Pedroso Guimarães (PTB) is the Committee Chairman and Clênia Leal Maranhão (PPS) is the Deputy Committee Chairwoman. Membership to CUTHAB:

Councilperson	Party
Pedro Ruas	Psol
Jonas Reis	PT
Coronel Ustra	PL
Marcos Felipi	Cidadania
Idenir Cecchim	MDB
José Freitas	Republicanos

=== Committee on Education, Culture, and Youth Affairs ===
Committee on Education, Culture, and Youth Affairs (CECE) has jurisdiction on educational affairs, sport facilities and, youth-related initiatives. Manuela Pinto Vieira d'Ávila (PCdoB) is the Committee Chairwoman and Maristela Maffei (PSB) is the Deputy Committee Chairwoman. Membership to CECE:

Councilperson	Party
Mariana Lescano	Progressistas
Grazi Oliveira	Psol
Carlo Carotenuto	Republicanos
Juliana de Souza	PT
Rafael Fleck	MDB

=== Committee on Consumer and Human Rights ===
Committee on Consumer and Human Rights (CEDECONDH) oversees consumer relations, human rights violation and, public safety. Carlos Atílio Todeschini (PT) is the Council Chairman and Jorge Antônio Dornelles Carpes (PTB) is the Deputy Committee Chairman. Membership to CEDECONDH:

Councilperson	Party
Natasha Ferreira	PT
Vera Armando	Progressistas
Marcelo Bernardi	PSDB
Erick Dênil	PCdoB
Comandante Nádia	PL

=== Committee on Health and Environment ===
Committee on Health and Environment (COSMAN) has jurisdiction on public-funded healthcare, sanitary inspection, sewage services and, environmental protection. João Carlos Cavalheiro Nedel (PP) is the Committee Chairman and Cláudio José de Souza Sebenelo is the Deputy Committee Chairman. Membership to COSMAN:

Councilperson	Party
Cláudia Araújo	PSD
Hamilton Sossmeier	Podemos
Aldacir Oliboni	PT
Atena Roveda	Psol
Teacher Tovi	Republicanos
Therapist Tanise Sabino	MDB

== See also ==
- Government of Porto Alegre
- Mayor of Porto Alegre
