= Minyo =

Minyo may refer to:

Min'yō (民謡)

- Min'yō (民謡), a style of Japanese accompanied folk singing
- Minyo, a style of Korean accompanied folk singing; see Traditional music of Korea#Korean voice (sori/chang)
