= California Science and Engineering Fair =

Annual science fair held at the California Science Center

- Nickname: CSEF
- Status: Active
- Genre: Science fair
- Frequency: Annually
- Venue: California Lutheran University, Thousand Oaks, California (Note: The venue varies. As of 2026, the fair is held at California Lutheran University, after having previously been held at the California Science Center until 2020.)
- Country: United States
- Years active: 74
- Inaugurated: April 19, 1952
- Founder: California Science Teachers' Association
- Previous event: April 13, 2025
- Next event: April 12, 2026
- Participants: 900
- Major events: Scientific research
- Organizer: California Science and Engineering Fair Foundation
- Sponsor: Amgen and Broadcom
- Website: csef.usc.edu

The California Science and Engineering Fair (or CSEF), previously known as the California State Science Fair, is a science fair held annually in Los Angeles, California. It serves as the final science fair of the academic year and is a feeder competition to the International Science and Engineering Fair (ISEF) and the Thermo Fisher Junior Innovators Challenge (TFJIC). First established in 1952, CSEF was designated the state's official science fair in 1990 and ran its 74th fair in 2025.

Every year, roughly 900 students from middle schools and high schools across California compete across two divisions and eighteen categories for the chance to win over $30,000 in prizes.

== History ==
No fair was held in 2020 as officials cited the COVID-19 pandemic as grounds for cancellation. The 69th was deferred to 2021.

== Qualification ==
The fair is fed by 28 regional science fairs, each of which is allocated a number of projects based on their number of participants. Projects can qualify by either placing first or second in their category at these fairs. The allocation in 2009 was 908 projects, an average of 24.7 projects per million population.

Fair	Located in	Number of projects
Humboldt County Science Fair	Eureka, California	16
Modoc County STEM Fair	Alturas, California	6
Mendocino County Science Fair	Ukiah, California	10
Glenn County STEM Expo	Orland, California	6
Colusa County Science and Engineering Fair	Colusa, California	6
Nevada County Science Fair	Grass Valley, California	6
Solano County Science Fair	Vallejo, California	6
Contra Costa County Science and Engineering Fair	Danville, California	18
Golden Gate STEM Fair	San Francisco, California	32
Alameda County Science and Engineering Fair	Alameda, California	25
Sacramento Regional STEM Fair	Sacramento, California	21
Calaveras County Science Fair	San Andreas, California	6
San Mateo County STEM Fair	Atherton, California	20
Santa Cruz County Science and Engineering Fair	Watsonville, California	38
Synopsys Silicon Valley Science and Technology Championship	San Jose, California	101
San Joaquin County Science Fair	Stockton, California	8
Merced STEM Fair	Merced, California	6
Monterey County Science and Engineering Fair	Salinas, California	21
San Benito County Science Fair	Hollister, California	6
Fresno County Science Fair	Fresno, California	50
Tulare County Science and Engineering Fair	Porterville, California	6
Santa Barbara County Science Fair	Santa Barbara, California	23
Kern County Regional Science Fair	Bakersfield, California	36
Ventura County Science Fair	Camarillo, California	35
Los Angeles County Science and Engineering Fair	Pasadena, California	94
SIM Science and Engineering Fair	San Bernardino, California	23
Riverside County Science and Engineering Fair	Riverside, California	38
Orange County Science and Engineering Fair	Orange, California	81
Greater San Diego Science and Engineering Fair	San Diego, California	89

== Awards ==
Awards, given in several categories across both divisions, are posted shortly after the fair ends each year. Roughly two to three projects amongst the first-place Senior division category winners are chosen to advance to ISEF.

At the 2009 fair, major awards included the Patricia Beckman Project of the Year Award—David Zarrin of Redwood Middle School, Saratoga won the Junior Division ($5,000 award) and Anna K. Simpson of Patrick Henry Senior High School, San Diego won the Senior Division ($10,000). There are also many special awards sponsored by various organizations, some with cash prizes.
