= Glen Gondo =

American restaurateur (1948–2024)

Glen Yoshiaki Gondo
- Born: 1948; Los Angeles, California, U.S.
- Died: 2024 (aged 75–76)
- Occupation(s): Businessman, restaurateur, cultural advocate
- Organization: Japan America Society of Houston (JASH)
- Known for: Popularizing Japanese cuisine and culture in Houston; Founding the Japan Festival of Houston
- Notable work: Japan Festival of Houston
- Board member of: Japan America Society of Houston, Texas Asia Society
- Awards: Order of the Rising Sun, Gold Rays with Rosette (2013) cmmendation for the promotion of Japanese culture in America from the Japanese Ministry of Foreign Affairs (early 2000s)

Glen Yoshiaki Gondo (1948 – July 1, 2024) was an American businessman, restaurateur, and cultural advocate. Gondo, whose parents opened the first Japanese restaurant and sushi bar in Houston, Texas, is credited with popularizing Japanese cuisine and culture in the city. In 1993, Gondo founded the Japan Festival of Houston, a free annual event which showcases Japanese culture. The Japan Festival is now one of the largest Japanese cultural festivals in the United States.

Gondo transitioned to catering in the 1990s. His family-owned company, Tokyo Gardens Catering, supplies Sushiya brand sushi to H-E-B, a supermarket and now operates sushi kiosks in more than 290 supermarkets across Texas.

== Biography ==
=== Early life ===
Gondo was born in 1948 in Los Angeles, California, to Japanese-immigrant parents, Eugene and Hisako Gondo. His parents had been forcibly relocated and imprisoned during the internment of Japanese Americans during World War II. Shortly after his birth, the Gondo family moved to Watsonville, California, where he was raised as a child. He then moved with his parents to Dallas, Texas, where they opened a Japanese restaurant.

The family moved again, this time to Houston in 1962. In 1966, his parents opened Tokyo Gardens restaurant, located at 4701 Westheimer Road, the first Japanese restaurant and sushi bar in Houston. The family-owned restaurant also introduced aspects of Japanese culture which were new to the city. Tokyo Gardens incorporated elements of Japanese architecture, cultural performances and a koi pond into the space.

Glen Gondo married his wife, Kathleen, in 1973.

=== Career ===
He began catering his own events and parties separate from his parents' business. By 1975, Gondo owned small sushi bars inside eight Fiesta Mart locations. Fiesta Mart, a regional supermarket chain, later discontinued Gondo's sushi bars. Glen and Kathy Gondo then moved to California, where he worked in the frozen food industry. Following two years in California, they moved to New York City, where Gondo joined his family's jewelry business.

In 1984, Gondo and his family moved permanently from New York City to Houston and adopted the city as his hometown. He also took over the family restaurant from his parents beginning in 1984. Gondo owned and operated the restaurant for 14 years until its closure in 1998.

He then transitioned the family business into catering, renaming it Tokyo Gardens Catering, short for Tokyo Gardens Catering and Sushic, LLC. Gondo provided catering for universities regionally, as well as Continental Airlines, which was headquartered in Houston and offered flights to Japan. In 2002, Gondo's Tokyo Gardens Catering began supplying sushi to the H-E-B supermarket chain under the "Sushiya" brand name at the invitation of then H-E-B president, Martin Otto. Gondo's first Sushiya sushi bar opened at the H-E-B location in Friendswood, Texas. His company's Sushiya sushi kiosks now operate in more than 290 H-E-B supermarkets across Texas, as of 2024. (His son, Robert Gondo, now heads the family's catering business after his father's retirement.) Gondo also started an international trade consulting business and opened several stores at George Bush Intercontinental Airport.

Gondo has been credited with pioneering Japanese culture in Houston as a longtime community leader in the city's Japanese and Japanese American community. In 1987, Gondo was elected to the board of directors of the Japan America Society of Houston (JASH) and joined the organization's membership committee beginning in 1988. He then served as vice president for Special Events at JASH from 1989 until 1992, when he was appointed President of the Japan America Society of Houston. He served as president from 1992 to 1999. In 1999, Gondo became JASH's Vice President of Business Initiatives and then the co-chair of its advisory committee. He organizaed a Mayor's Challenge baseball game between Houston and its Japanese sister city, Chiba City, to mark the 2000 Millennium Matsuri. Gondo was re-elected as President of the Japan America Society of Houston in 2005. He served his second term as JASH president from 2006 until 2010, when he retired from the JASH leadership. However, he remained active with JASH for the rest of his life. Gondo also served on the boards of other organizations, including the Texas Asia Society.

Gondo's election as President of the Japan America Society of Houston in 1992 coincided with JASH's 25th silver anniversary. At the time, Houston had just completed the Japanese Garden in Hermann Park in 1992. Glen Gondo conceived the idea of holding a Japan Festival in Hermann Park as a way to showcase the new Japanese Garden to the community. Gondo pitched the idea to Houston Mayor Bob Lanier and the city government, who allowed the Japan Festival to utilize Hermann Park. The first Japan Festival of Houston, which was founded by Glen Gondo through his work as JASH president, was held in the park in 1993. The free Japan Festival, held annually at Hermann Park, is now one of largest Japanese cultural festivals in the United States, as of 2024. Gondo led the Japan Festival for many years and the JASH has called the event "his legacy."

In 1993, Gondo joined with other community activists to help elect Martha Wong, who became the first Asian American woman elected to Houston City Council.

The Japanese government and the Consulate-General of Japan in Houston awarded Gondo the Order of the Rising Sun, Gold Rays with Rosette in July 2013. Glen Gondo received the order for his contributions to Japanese culture in Houston and the promotion of constructive Japan-United States relations. He also received the Commendation for the promotion of Japanese culture in America from the Japanese Ministry of Foreign Affairs in the early 2000s.

Gondo died from cancer on July 1, 2024, at the age of 75.
