= Machida Kashō =

Loud speaker relay

Machida Kashō (In Japanese: 町田嘉章, 1888–1981), also known as Kasho Machida, was a Japanese shamisen player, ethnomusicologist and music critic. As a researcher, Machida collected folksongs through Japan, creating several volumes of transcriptions and song notations of min'yō from different regions of the country. He collected and record systematically disappearing rural songs.

Machida directed his efforts to a movement of "new folk song'' that devised folk-like songs for matching musical commercialization.

== Works ==
In 1940, Machida Kashô worked as editor of the record set Nihon min’you rekôdo (Japanese Folksongs Records, 1940), with three volumes of 10 discs. 300 songs of the discs were copied from other discs record by Machida previously.

Between 1941 and 1942, Machida Kashô involved in the elaboration of the anthology of Nihon Ongaku-shu (Album of Japanese Music), focused on traditional music and created by the Kokusai Bunka Shinkô-kai (KBS, International Organization for the Promotion of Culture).

Between 1944 and 1980, Machida created an anthology of nine volumes of transcriptions and song notations from Hokkaido to Kyushu areas, released by Nippon Hôsô Kyôkai (NHK).
