= Japan Festival =

Texas festival celebrating Japanese culture

Japanese Festival of Houston
- Status: Active
- Genre: Japanese Culture, Anime
- Venue: Hermann Park
- Location: Houston, Texas
- Country: United States
- Inaugurated: 1993
- Founder: Glen Gondo
- Attendance: 30,000 in 2015
- Organizer: Japanese Festival of Houston Inc.
- Website: http://www.houstonjapanfest.org/

The Japanese Festival of Houston, located in Houston, Texas is considered one of the largest Japanese festivals in the United States. Hosted originally by the Japan America Society of Houston (JASH, ヒューストン日米協会 Hyūsuton Nichibei Kyōkai), the festival is now handled by the Japan Festival of Houston Inc. under the Japan-America Society of Houston advisement.

The Japan Festival is located in Hermann Park, typically adjacent to the Japanese Garden near downtown Houston. The event can attract nearly 30,000 visitors in a single weekend. While the festival theme changes from year to year, the premise remains the same to educate the citizens of Houston on the fundamental interests and facts about Japan. Houston's Japan Festival is now one of the largest Japanese cultural festivals in the United States.

== History ==
The Japan Festival was founded by Houston businessman Glen Gondo, the then president of the Japan America Society of Houston (JASH). Gondo had been elected president of JASH in 1992. That same year, the city of Houston unveiled the new Japanese Garden, designed by landscape architect Ken Nakajima, in the city's Hermann Park. Gondo originally conceived the idea of holding a potential "Japan Festival" in Hermann Park as a way to showcase and publicize the new Japanese Garden. He presented his festival concept to Houston Mayor Bob Lanier and the city government, who granted him permission to hold the event in Hermann Park. The first Japan Festival of Houston was held in 1993. Glen Gondo continued to lead and organize the festival for many years.

In 2009, the festival was awarded the title of "Best Festival" by the Houston Press.

This festival went on hiatus in 2020 due to the COVID-19 pandemic and did not return in 2021 or 2022.

The festival returned in May 2023. In addition to commercial, merchandise and food booths, there were demonstrations for sumo wrestling, and on the main stage there were other activities including Taiko drumming, and performances by artists like the Minyo Crusaders. The 2024 festival was held on September 7-8, and the 2025 festival was held on September 6-7.

== See also ==
- History of the Japanese in Houston
