= Watsonville, California =

City in California, United States

- City
- City of Watsonville
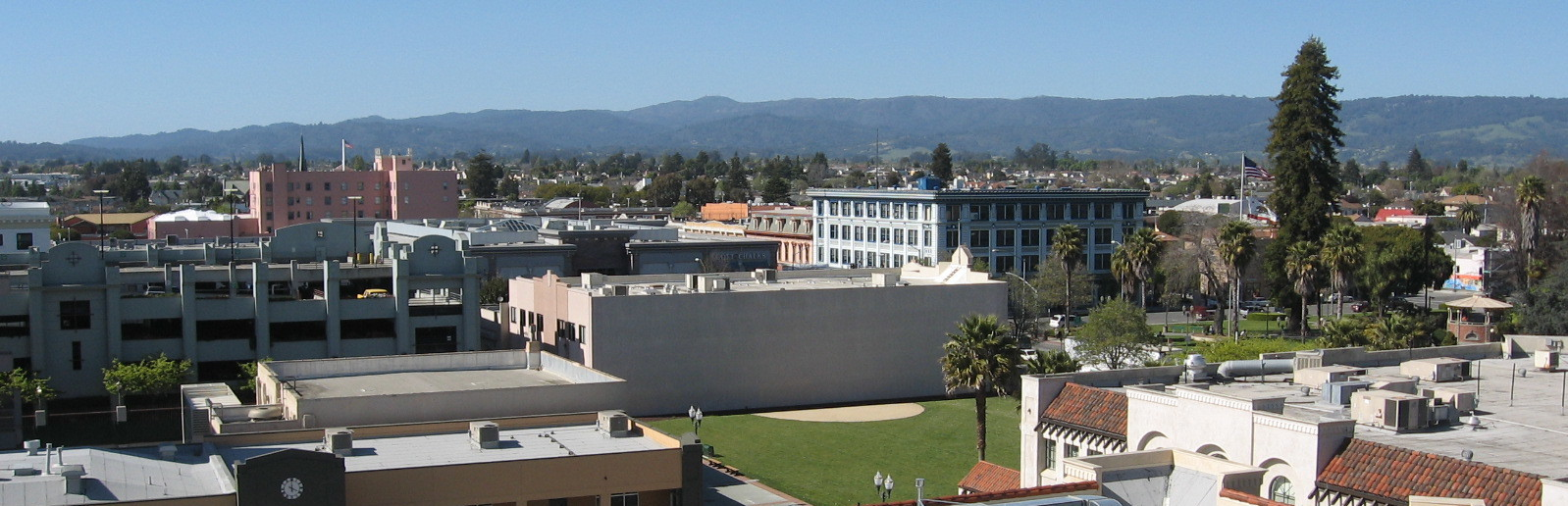
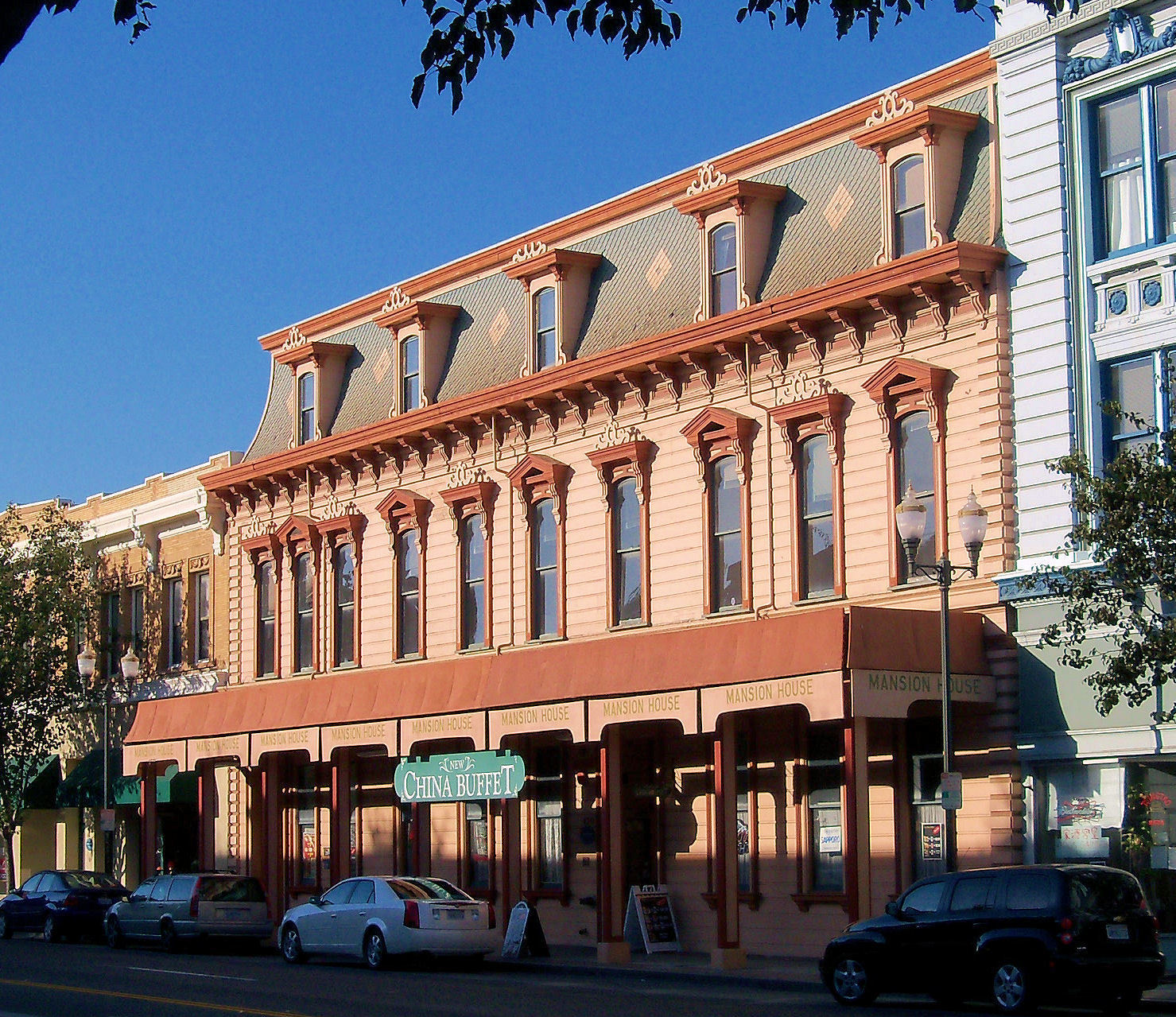
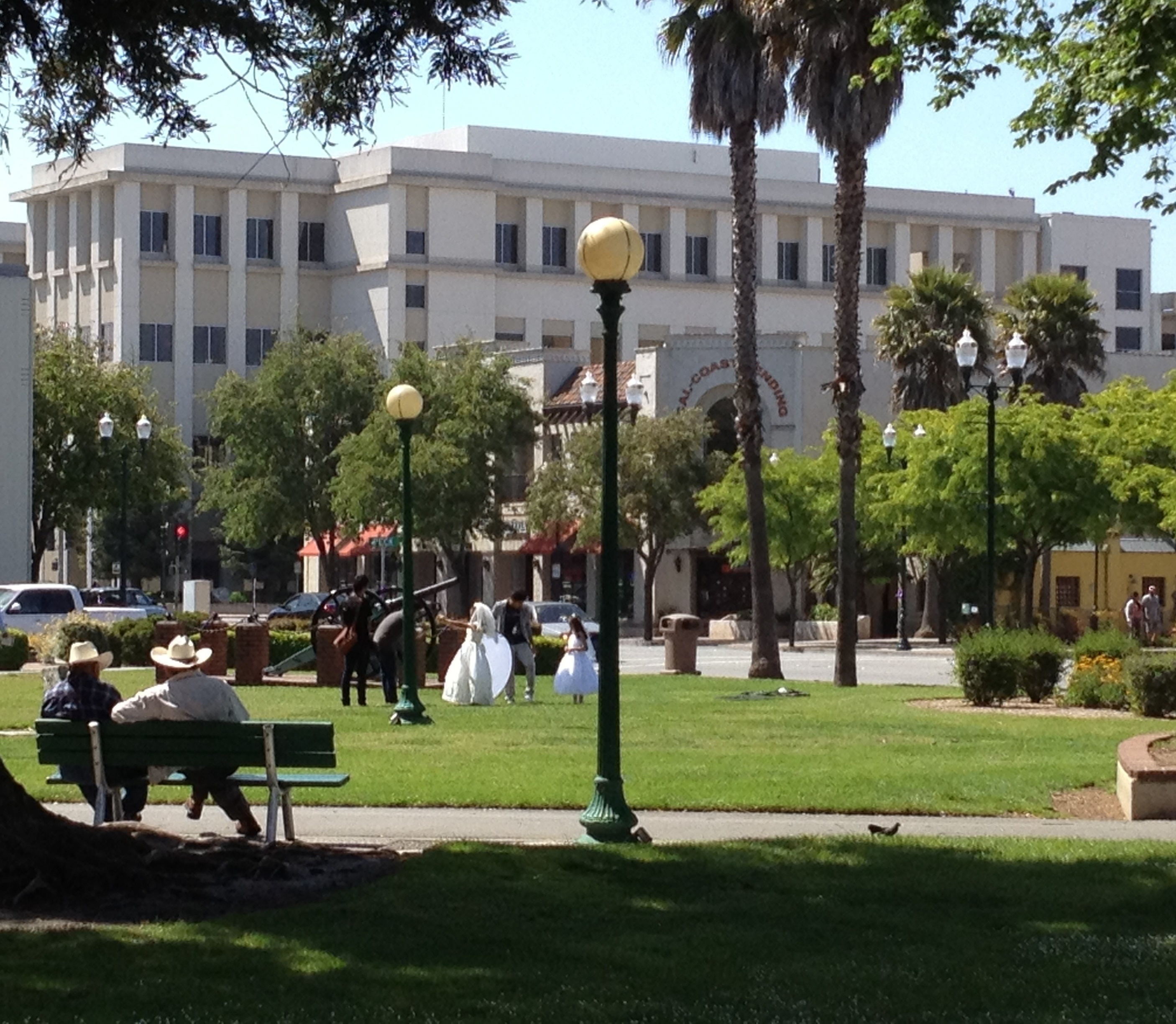
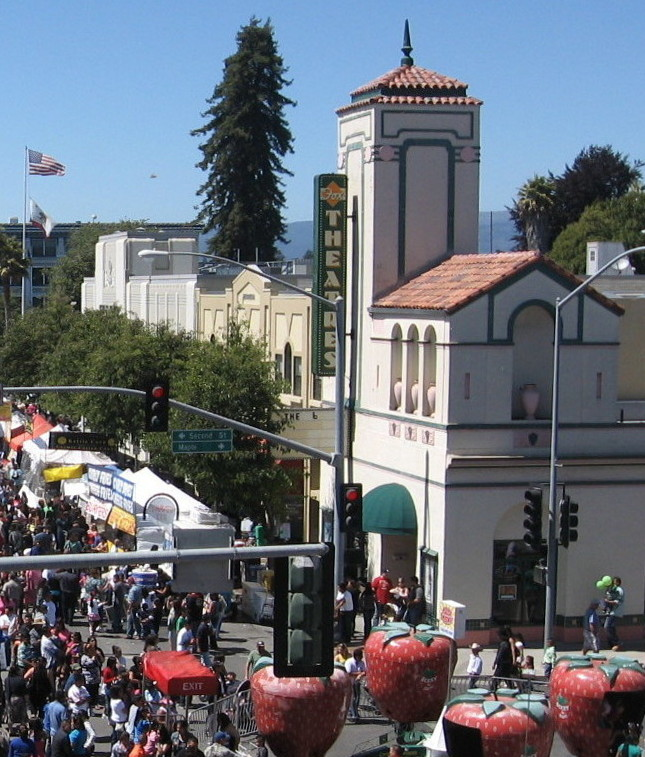
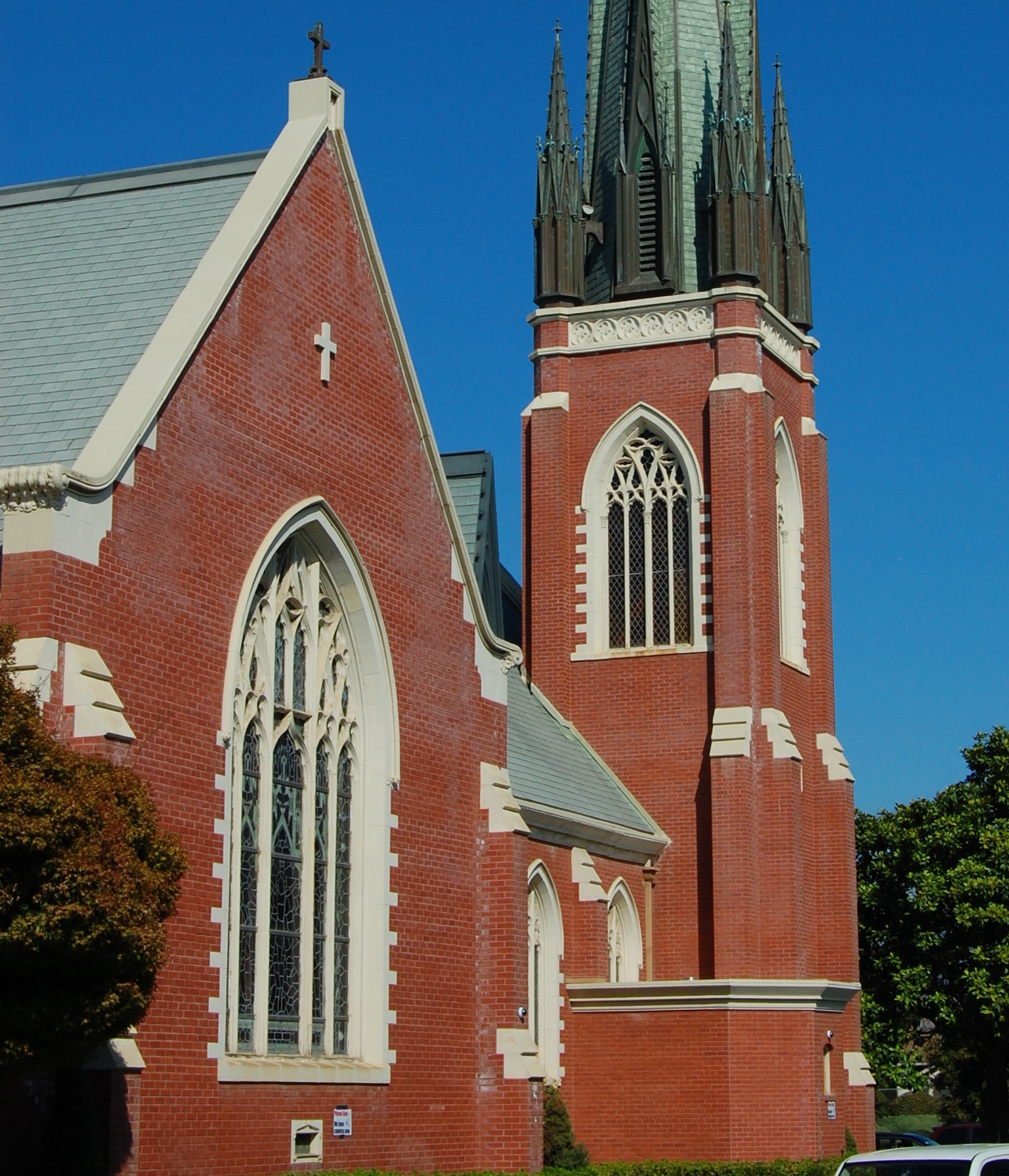
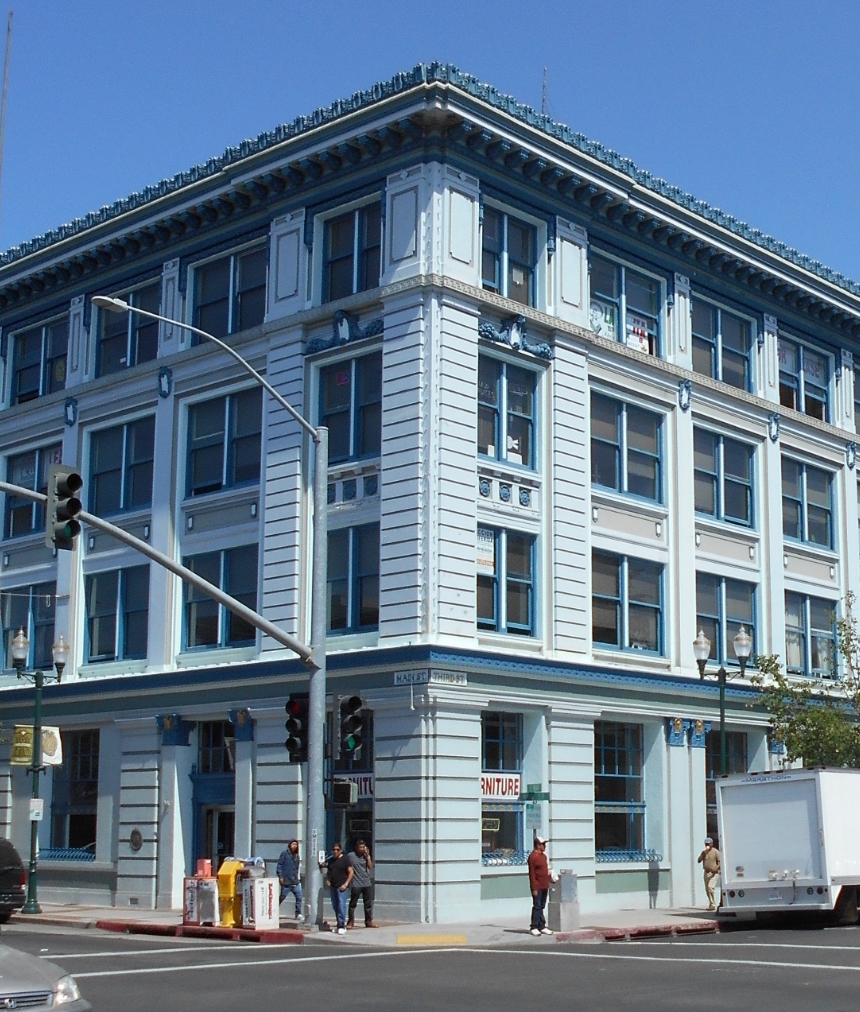
- Downtown Watsonville Mansion House Hotel City Plaza Fox Theater and Strawberry Festival St. Patrick Church Lettunich Building

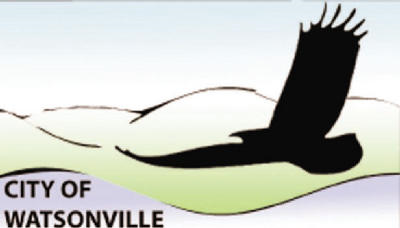
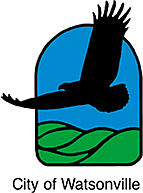
- Flag Seal
- Motto(s): "Opportunity through diversity; unity through cooperation!"
- Interactive map of Watsonville, California
- Location in the United States
- Coordinates: 36°55′12″N 121°45′49″W
- Country: United States
- State: California
- County: Santa Cruz
- Incorporated: March 30, 1868

Government
  - Type: Council–manager

Area
  - Total: 6.80 sq mi (17.62 km^{2})
  - Land: 6.71 sq mi (17.37 km^{2})
  - Water: 0.097 sq mi (0.25 km^{2}) 1.41%
- Elevation: 30 ft (9 m)

Population (2020)
  - Total: 52,590
  - Density: 7,841/sq mi (3,027.5/km^{2})
- Time zone: UTC-8 (Pacific)
  - Summer (DST): UTC-7 (PDT)
- ZIP codes: 95076, 95077
- Area code: 831
- FIPS code: 06-83668
- GNIS feature IDs: 1660138, 2412194
- Website: cityofwatsonville.org

Watsonville is a city in Santa Cruz County, California, United States, in the Monterey Bay Area of the Central Coast of California. The population was 52,590 at the 2020 census. Predominantly Latino and Democratic, Watsonville is a self-designated sanctuary city.

== History ==
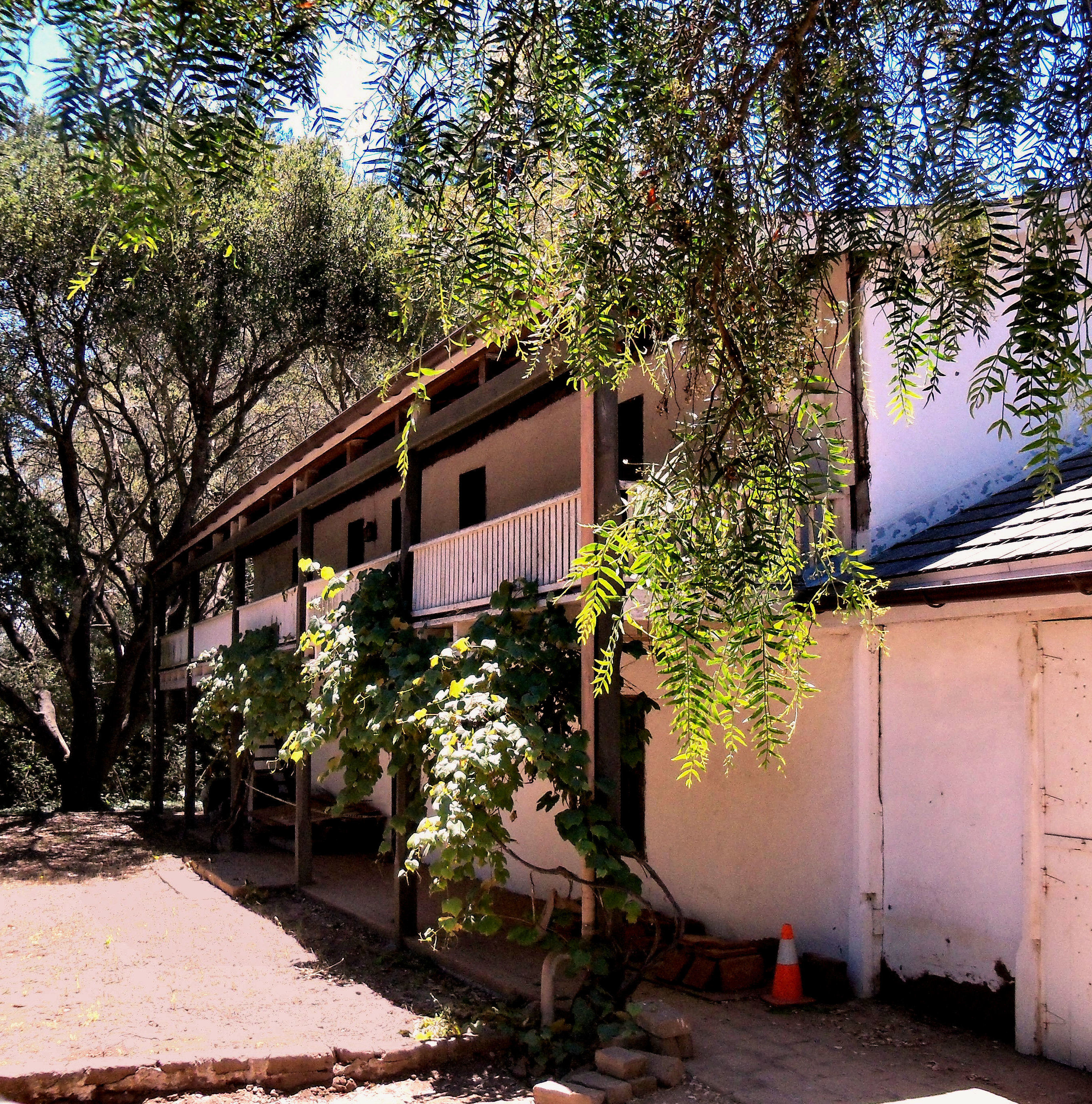
The Castro Adobe, built by Juan José Castro on Rancho San Andrés, is the oldest building in Watsonville.

Watsonville's land was first inhabited by an Ohlone nation of Indigenous Californians. This tribe settled along the Pajaro Dunes since the land was fertile and useful for the cultivation of their plants and animals.

=== Spanish era ===
In 1769, the Portolá expedition, the first Europeans to explore the area, arrived from the south, where soldiers described a big bird they saw near a large river. The story survived in the river's name, Rio del Pajaro (River of the Bird).

The Portolá expedition continued north through the area, camping at one of the lakes north of town for five nights, on October 10–14, 1769. Many of the expedition's soldiers had scurvy, so progress was slow. While the sick recuperated, scouts led by Sergeant Ortega looked for the best way forward. On the fifth day, Franciscan missionary Juan Crespi, traveling with the expedition, wrote in his diary, "This afternoon the explorers returned. The sergeant reported that he had gone ahead twelve leagues without getting any information of the harbor that we are looking for, and that he went to the foot of a high, white mountain range."

During the October March 10, the explorers first saw the Coast redwood tree (Spanish: palo colorado). A bronze plaque at Pinto Lake (now a city park) commemorates the event. On October 15, the expedition continued to the northwest past today's community of Freedom, camping that night at Corralitos Lagoon.

The area became part of the Spanish colonial province of Las Californias, and in 1804 the northern part was split off to form Alta California. The area's pasture lands were assigned to the Spanish mission to the south, in Carmel.

=== Mexican era ===
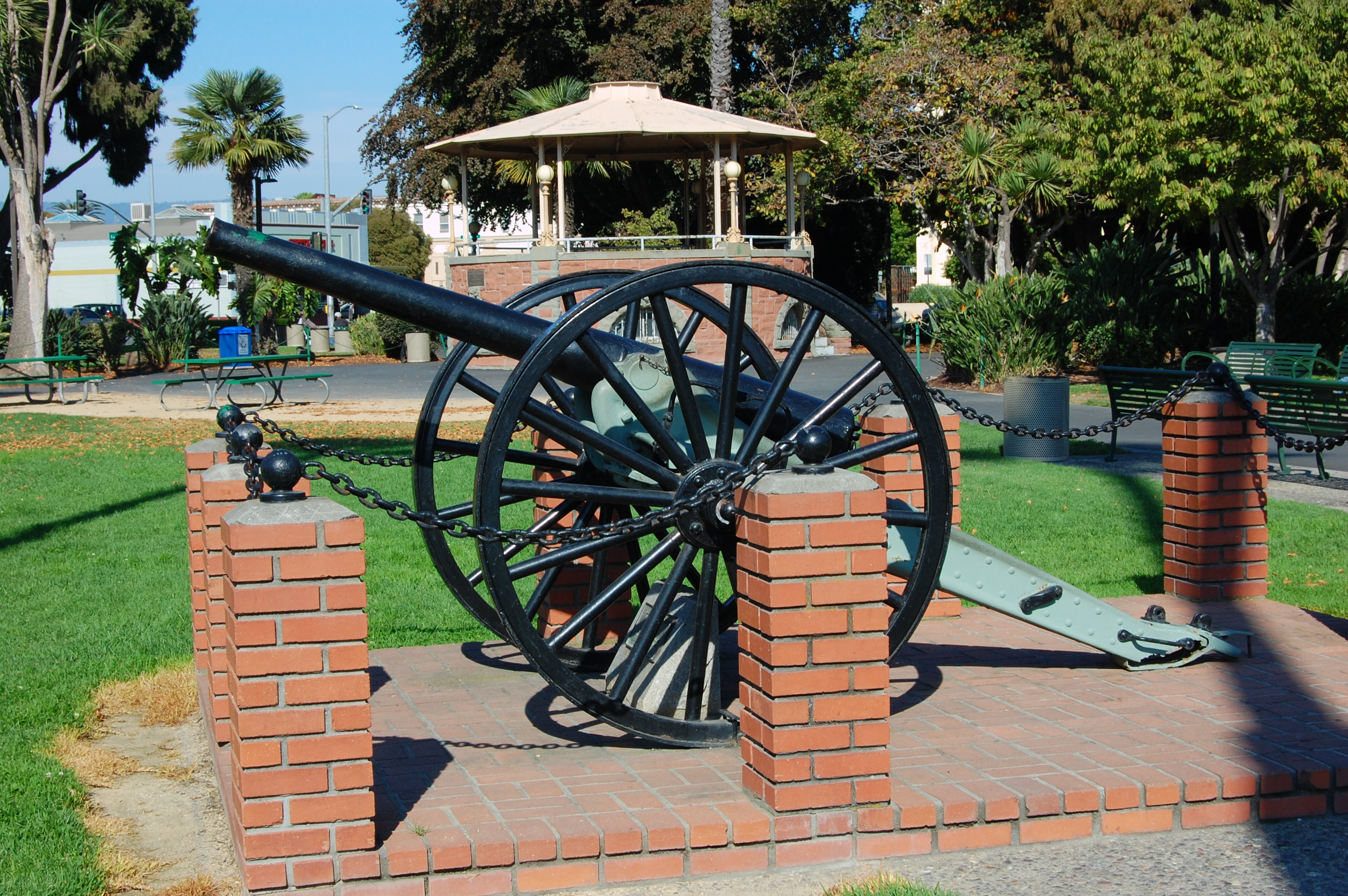
The cannon in Watsonville Plaza was fired in 1850 to celebrate California's admission as a state.

When Mexico gained independence, it took possession of Alta California. The Spanish missions were secularized in the 1830s, and the future Watsonville area became Rancho Bolsa del Pajaro, a land grant made to Sebastian Rodríguez in 1837. Under Mexico's more liberal land-ownership laws, immigration to the area from Europe and the U.S. increased.

In 1833, Governor José Figueroa granted Rancho San Andrés to José Joaquín Castro, who came to California as part of the 1776 Anza Expedition and later became patriarch of a locally prominent Californio family. His son, Juan José Castro, built the Castro Adobe, the only two-story hacienda in the area at the time. Today, the adobe is owned by California State Parks and is undergoing restoration to serve as the Rancho San Andrés Castro Adobe State Historic Park.

=== Post-Conquest era ===
Following the American Conquest of California and the ratification of the Treaty of Guadalupe Hidalgo in 1848, the region began to receive large waves of migrants, mainly Americans from the East Coast and Europeans.

John H. Watson and D. S. Gregory laid out the town in 1852. The community was incorporated as the Town of Watsonville on or about March 30, 1868, named after Watson. It became the City of Watsonville about 1889. Voters adopted a charter in 1903.

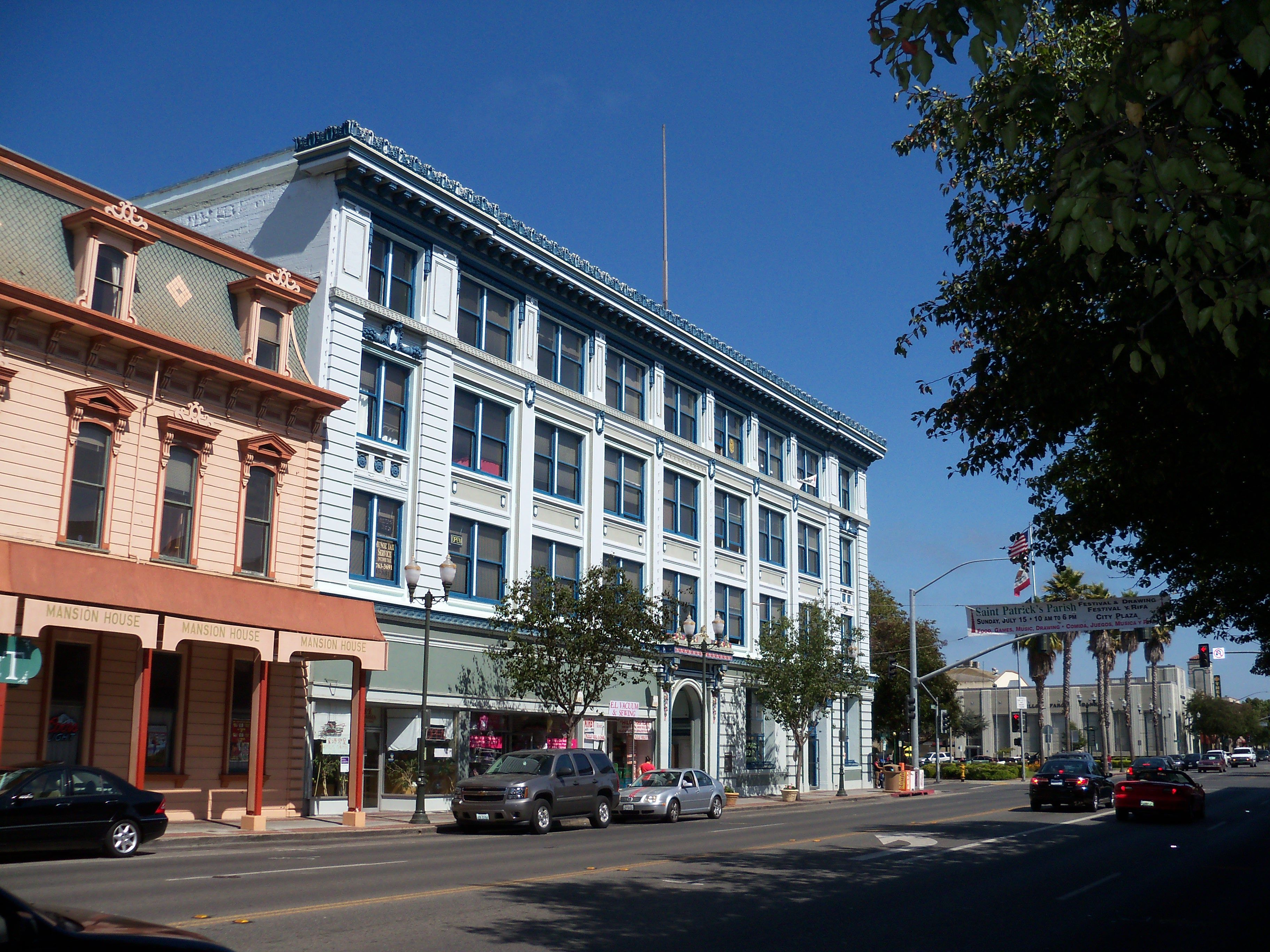
The Lettenich Building, built in 1914 by Bay Area architect W. H. Weeks

=== Modern era ===
From 1904 to 1913, the Watsonville Railway and Navigation Company operated an interurban railway to Port Watsonville on Monterey Bay, where it connected with an overnight produce packet boat to San Francisco.

The Watsonville riots was a race riot that occurred in January 1930. The riots were preceded by efforts of a local justice of the peace, D.W. Rohrback (Note: Some sources spell the judge's last name Rohrback, others spell it Rohrbach.) to stoke anti-Filipino sentiments. Filipino American farmworkers, then-U.S. nationals, were attacked by White Americans, including the killing of Fermin Tobera. In May 2023, the Monterey County Board of Supervisors issued an apology for the riot in form of a resolution during Asian American and Pacific Islander Heritage Month.

The Maggie Sue Earthquake with a magnitude of 4.5, a shallow depth of 7 kilometers, and an epicenter of approximately 3 kilometers West of Moss Landing struck on September 29, 2024 at 2:47 AM local time. The Maggie Sue Earthquake had a high intensity rating with impacts especially strong throughout the Moss Landing, Aromas, and Watsonville areas, with intense shaking felt throughout Santa Cruz and Monterey Counties as far south as Salinas and Monterey.

Watonsville's present city charter was adopted on February 16, 1960.

In 1985, cannery workers in Watsonville went on strike for 18 months to protest a decrease in their wages and benefits. In the end, they won a new contract. The movement was led by primarily Latina women, and was noted as a historic labor rights win for the Mexicano/Chicano community.

== Geography ==
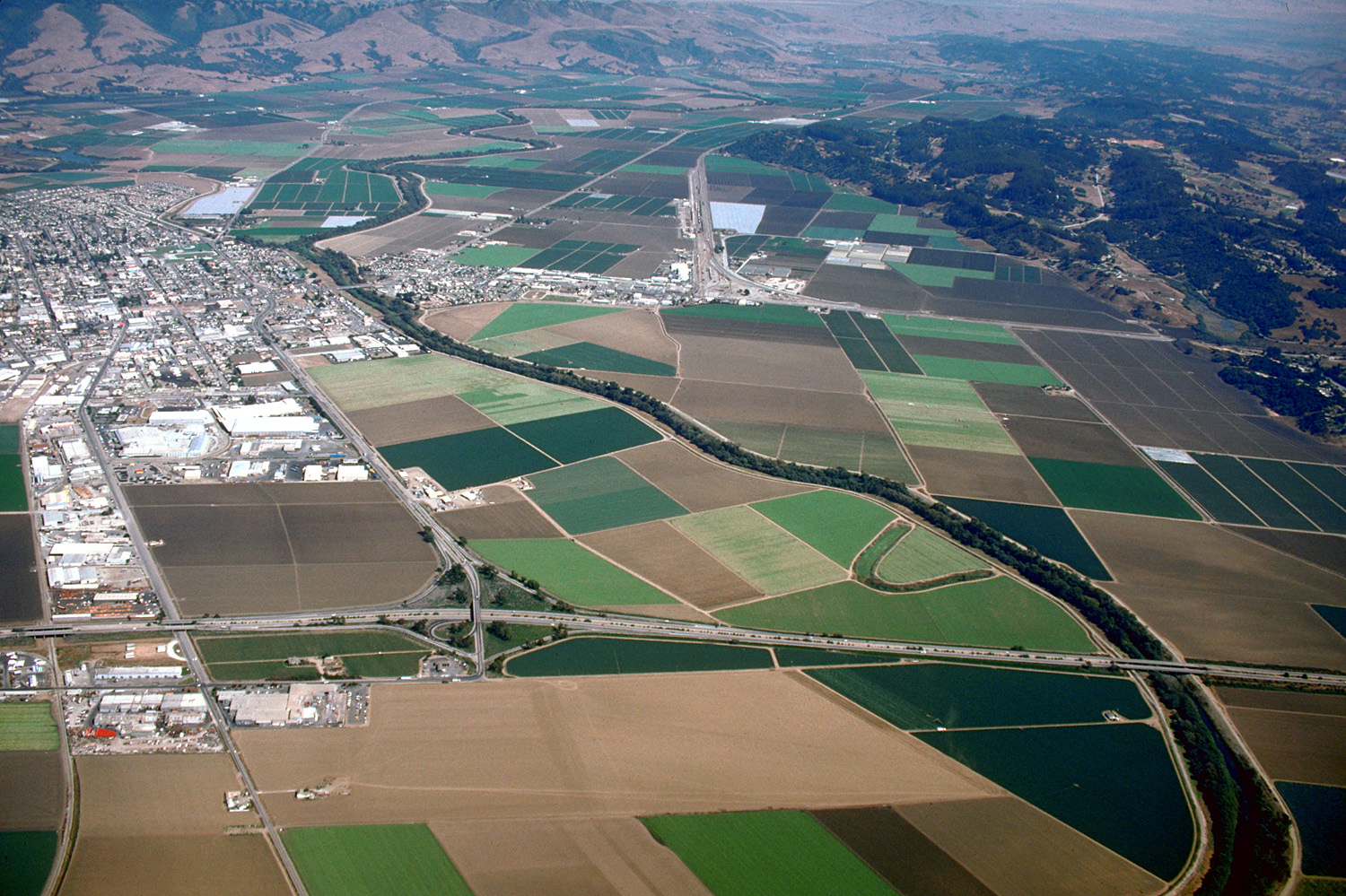
Aerial view of Watsonville (left) and the Pajaro River (right).

Watsonville is in the Monterey Bay area, at the southern end of Santa Cruz County.

According to the United States Census Bureau, the city has an area of 6.8 square miles (18 km^{2}), of which 6.7 square miles (17 km^{2}) is land and 0.1 square miles (0.26 km^{2}) is water.

Watsonville has habitat areas that support the endangered species Santa Cruz Tarweed on the California coastal prairie ecosystem. Population has grown considerably since 1980, requiring preparation of a number of Environmental Impact Reports, with resultant development removing certain lands of the city from productive natural habitat.

Most of the coastal land adjacent to Watsonville is part of the Monterey Bay National Marine Sanctuary. Another protected natural resource is the Watsonville wetlands, a system of fresh water sloughs with open water and native vegetation that extend from the city to the ocean. The slough system is only one of a few remaining wetland areas of its kind in the California Coastal Region. Not only are the wetlands home to approximately nine species of fish and over 200 species of waterfowl, raptors and songbirds; they are also a vital stop on the Pacific Flyway for thousands of migrating birds. In 1990, private and municipal organizations worked together to stop development and protect this resource. The Watsonville Wetlands Watch was established at that time with the task of restoring and protecting the slough's natural habit.

=== Climate ===
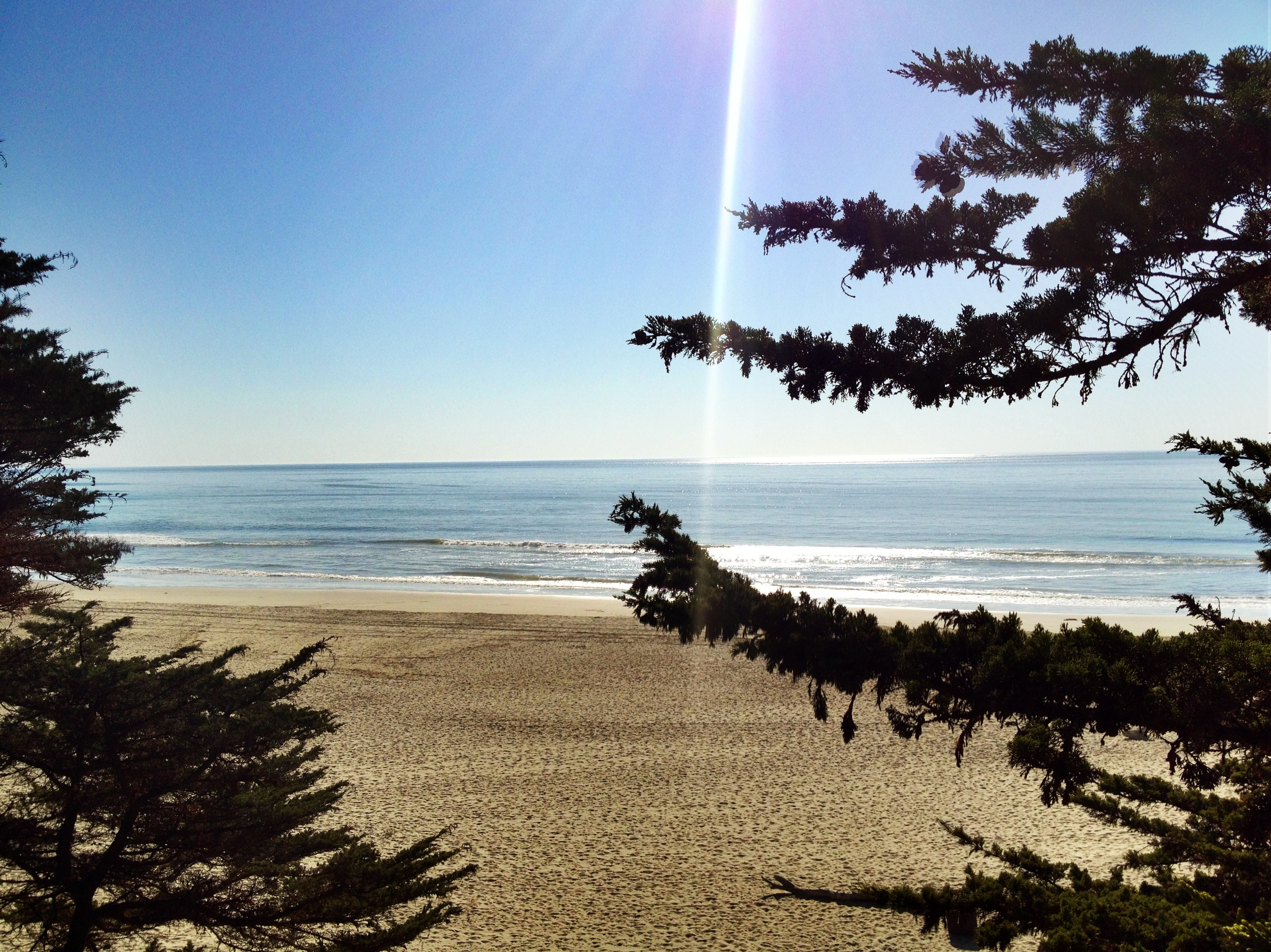
Sunset State Beach is near Watsonville

The National Weather Service cooperative station at the Watsonville Waterworks reports cool, relatively wet winters and mild, dry summers. Fog and low overcast is common in the night and morning, especially in the summer, when warmer air from inland areas mixes with the cool, moist air near Monterey Bay. Its Köppen classification is cool-summer mediterranean climate.

January, normally the coldest month, has an average maximum of 59.9 °F (15.5 °C) and an average minimum of 38.5 °F (3.6 °C). September, normally the warmest month, has an average maximum of 73.2 °F (22.9 °C) and an average minimum of 51.7 °F (10.9 °C). There are an average of 4.9 days annually with highs of 90 °F (32 °C) or higher and an average of 13.5 days annually with lows of 32 °F (0 °C) or lower. Cool nights are common in the summer, due to the influence of chilly Monterey Bay. The record high temperature from the late 20th century onward was 106 °F (41 °C) on October 2, 1980. (An earlier June day has been recorded as 110 °F (43 °C).) The record low temperature from the late 20th century onward was 12 °F (−11 °C) on December 22, 1990, though a 2 °F (−17 °C) low was previously recorded.

Average annual rainfall is 22.42 inches (569 mm), with measurable precipitation falling on an average of 61 days each year. The wettest year on record was 1983, with 48.35 inches (1,228 mm), and the driest was 1976, with 10.66 inches (271 mm). The most rainfall in one month was 15.99 inches (406 mm) in February 1998. The most rainfall in 24 hours was 5.93 inches (151 mm) on February 14, 2000. Although significant snowfall occurs several times a year on the higher mountains nearby, measurable snowfall is a rarity along Monterey Bay. On February 26, 2011, there was slight snowfall in Watsonville, but there was so little snow that it could not be measured.

Climate data for Watsonville
| Month | Jan | Feb | Mar | Apr | May | Jun | Jul | Aug | Sep | Oct | Nov | Dec | Year |
|---|---|---|---|---|---|---|---|---|---|---|---|---|---|
| Record high °F (°C) | 82.0 (27.8) | 84.9 (29.4) | 95.0 (35.0) | 100.9 (38.3) | 99.0 (37.2) | 109.9 (43.3) | 105.1 (40.6) | 105.1 (40.6) | 105.1 (40.6) | 106.0 (41.1) | 93.0 (33.9) | 84.0 (28.9) | 109.9 (43.3) |
| Mean daily maximum °F (°C) | 60.3 (15.7) | 62.6 (17.0) | 64.4 (18.0) | 66.7 (19.3) | 68.5 (20.3) | 71.2 (21.8) | 71.2 (21.8) | 71.6 (22.0) | 73.2 (22.9) | 72.0 (22.2) | 67.1 (19.5) | 61.2 (16.2) | 67.5 (19.7) |
| Daily mean °F (°C) | 49.3 (9.6) | 51.6 (10.9) | 53.2 (11.8) | 55.4 (13.0) | 57.7 (14.3) | 60.4 (15.8) | 61.3 (16.3) | 61.9 (16.6) | 61.9 (16.6) | 59.2 (15.1) | 54.3 (12.4) | 49.6 (9.8) | 56.3 (13.5) |
| Mean daily minimum °F (°C) | 38.1 (3.4) | 40.6 (4.8) | 42.1 (5.6) | 44.1 (6.7) | 46.9 (8.3) | 49.6 (9.8) | 51.4 (10.8) | 52.0 (11.1) | 50.5 (10.3) | 46.6 (8.1) | 41.4 (5.2) | 38.1 (3.4) | 45.1 (7.3) |
| Record low °F (°C) | 1.9 (−16.7) | 23.0 (−5.0) | 24.1 (−4.4) | 21.9 (−5.6) | 26.1 (−3.3) | 30.9 (−0.6) | 32.0 (0.0) | 30.0 (−1.1) | 32.0 (0.0) | 21.9 (−5.6) | 21.9 (−5.6) | 12.0 (−11.1) | 1.9 (−16.7) |
| Average precipitation inches (mm) | 4.5 (115) | 3.9 (100) | 3.0 (77) | 1.5 (38) | 0.5 (12) | 0.2 (4) | 0.0 (1) | 0.0 (1) | 0.3 (8) | 1.0 (25) | 2.4 (61) | 4.2 (107) | 21.6 (548) |
| Average precipitation days | 10 | 9 | 9 | 5 | 3 | 1 | 0 | 1 | 1 | 4 | 6 | 9 | 58 |

== Demographics ==
Historical population
| Census | Pop. | Note | %± |
|---|---|---|---|
| 1860 | 398 | | — |
| 1870 | 1,151 | | 189.2% |
| 1880 | 1,799 | | 56.3% |
| 1890 | 2,149 | | 19.5% |
| 1900 | 3,528 | | 64.2% |
| 1910 | 4,446 | | 26.0% |
| 1920 | 5,013 | | 12.8% |
| 1930 | 8,344 | | 66.4% |
| 1940 | 8,937 | | 7.1% |
| 1950 | 11,572 | | 29.5% |
| 1960 | 13,293 | | 14.9% |
| 1970 | 14,719 | | 10.7% |
| 1980 | 23,662 | | 60.8% |
| 1990 | 31,099 | | 31.4% |
| 2000 | 44,265 | | 42.3% |
| 2010 | 51,199 | | 15.7% |
| 2020 | 52,590 | | 2.7% |
U.S. Decennial Census

=== 2020 census ===
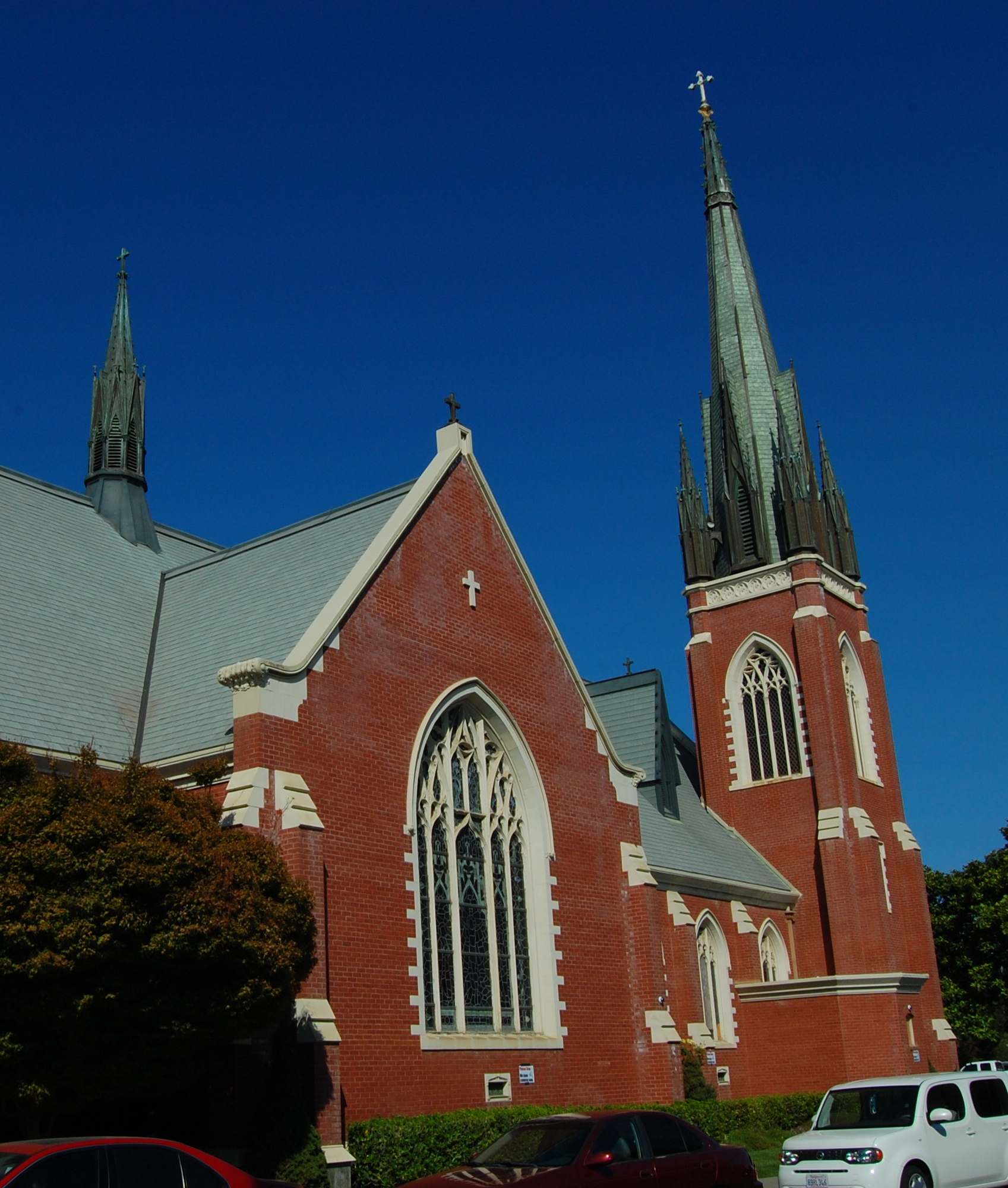
St. Patrick Church of the Roman Catholic Diocese of Monterey

As of the 2020 census, Watsonville had a population of 52,590 and a population density of 7,841.1 inhabitants per square mile (3,027.5/km^{2}). The census reported that 100.0% of residents lived in urban areas and 0.0% lived in rural areas.

Racial composition as of the 2020 census
| Race | Number | Percent |
|---|---|---|
| White | 11,723 | 22.3% |
| Black or African American | 316 | 0.6% |
| American Indian and Alaska Native | 1,416 | 2.7% |
| Asian | 1,612 | 3.1% |
| Native Hawaiian and Other Pacific Islander | 46 | 0.1% |
| Some other race | 27,188 | 51.7% |
| Two or more races | 10,289 | 19.6% |
| Hispanic or Latino (of any race) | 43,303 | 82.3% |

The age distribution was 28.2% under the age of 18, 10.2% aged 18 to 24, 27.8% aged 25 to 44, 22.0% aged 45 to 64, and 11.7% who were 65 years of age or older. The median age was 33.1 years. For every 100 females, there were 97.3 males, and for every 100 females age 18 and over there were 95.5 males age 18 and over.

There were 14,239 households, out of which 48.9% included children under the age of 18, 48.8% were married-couple households, 7.2% were cohabiting couple households, 29.1% had a female householder with no spouse or partner present, and 14.9% had a male householder with no spouse or partner present. About 18.1% of households were one person, and 9.6% had someone living alone who was 65 years of age or older. The average household size was 3.62. There were 10,895 families (76.5% of all households).

The census reported that 98.0% of the population lived in households, 1.5% lived in non-institutionalized group quarters, and 0.5% were institutionalized.

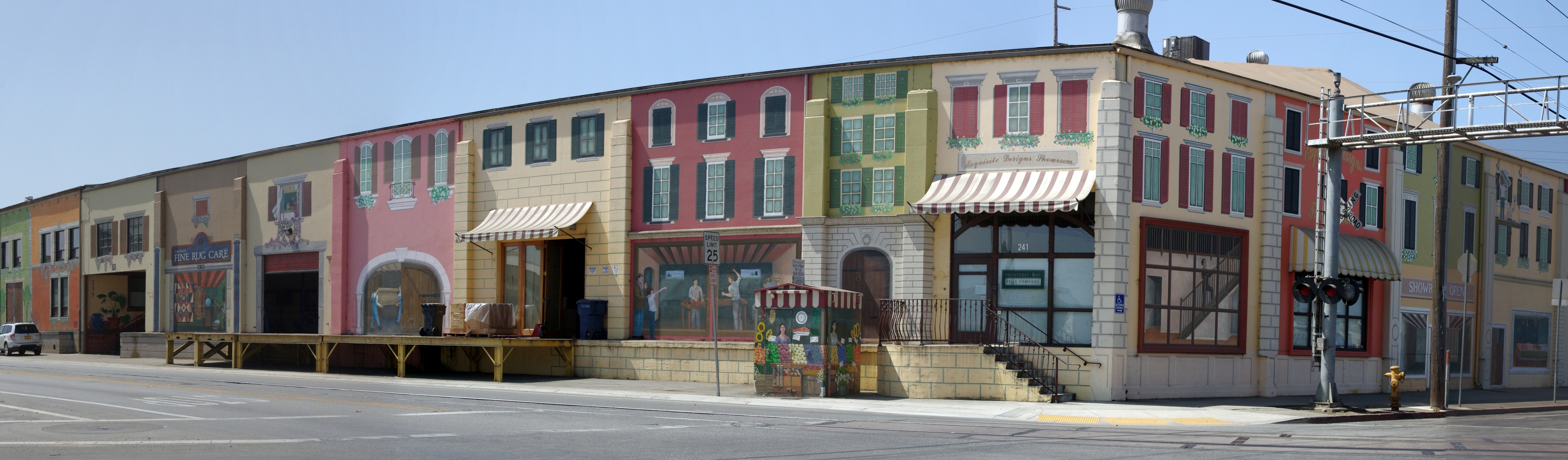
Warehouse in Watsonville

There were 14,585 housing units at an average density of 2,174.6 units per square mile (839.6 units/km^{2}), of which 14,239 (97.6%) were occupied. Of occupied units, 41.8% were owner-occupied and 58.2% were occupied by renters. The homeowner vacancy rate was 0.5%, and the rental vacancy rate was 1.8%.

=== 2023 estimate ===
In 2023, the US Census Bureau estimated that the median household income in 2023 was $74,785, and the per capita income was $27,296. About 12.8% of families and 15.1% of the population were below the poverty line.

=== 2010 census ===
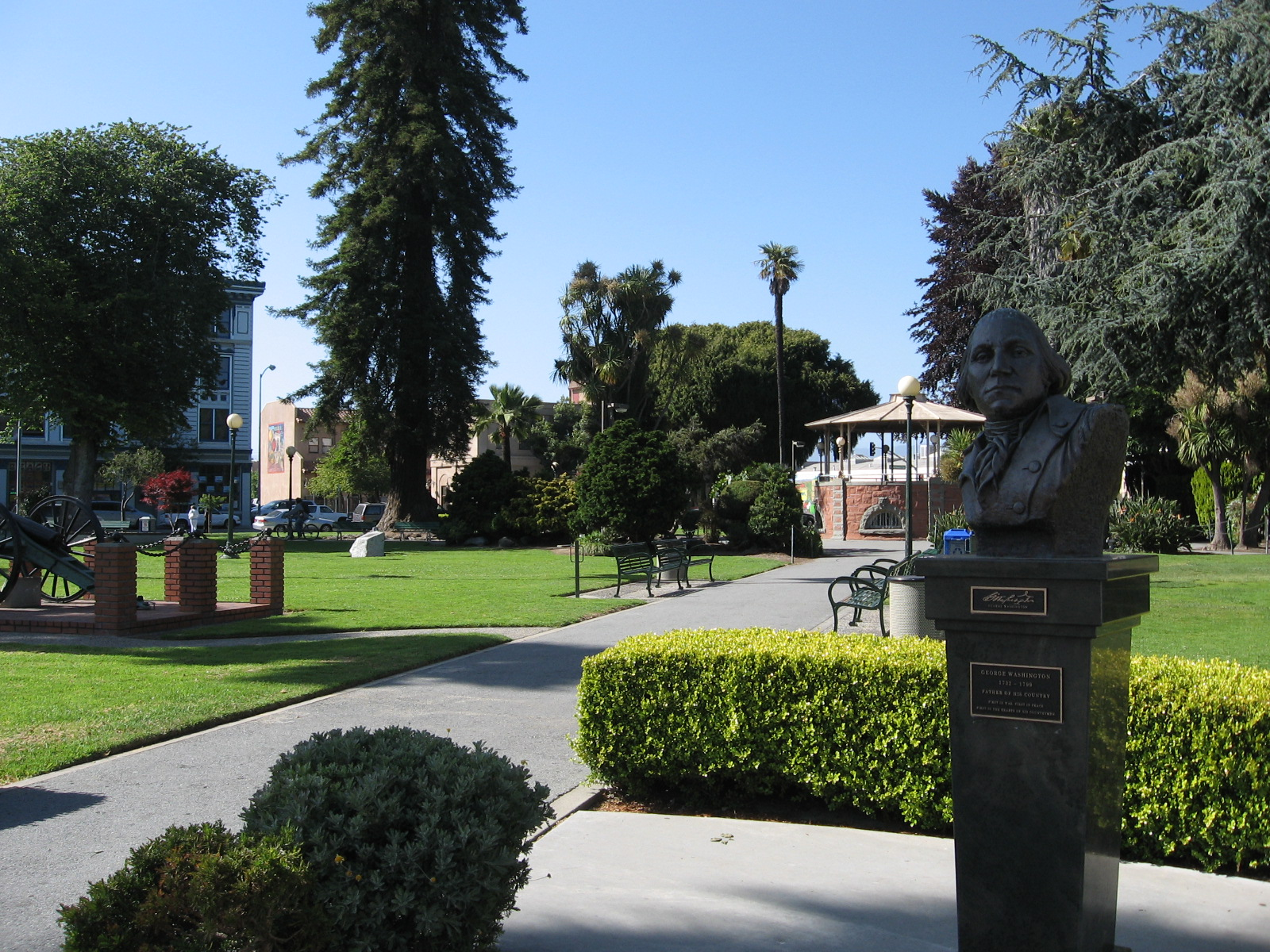
Watsonville Plaza, located downtown, was laid out in the 1850s.

The 2010 United States census reported that Watsonville had a population of 51,199. The population density was 7,547.7 inhabitants per square mile (2,914.2/km^{2}). The racial makeup of Watsonville was 22,399 (43.7%) White, 358 (0.7%) African American, 629 (1.2%) Native American, 1,664 (3.3%) Asian, 40 (0.1%) Pacific Islander, 23,844 (46.6%) from other races, and 2,265 (4.4%) from two or more races. Hispanic or Latino of any race were 41,656 persons (81.4%).

The Census reported that 50,671 people (99.0% of the population) lived in households, 322 (0.6%) lived in non-institutionalized group quarters, and 206 (0.4%) were institutionalized.

There were 13,528 households, out of which 7,130 (52.7%) had children under the age of 18 living in them, 7,231 (53.5%) were opposite-sex married couples living together, 2,375 (17.6%) had a female householder with no husband present, 903 (6.7%) had a male householder with no wife present. There were 890 (6.6%) unmarried opposite-sex partnerships, and 107 (0.8%) same-sex married couples or partnerships. 2,466 households (18.2%) were made up of individuals, and 1,213 (9.0%) had someone living alone who was 65 years of age or older. The average household size was 3.75. There were 10,509 families (77.7% of all households); the average family size was 4.17.

The population was spread out, with 16,111 people (31.5%) under the age of 18, 6,001 people (11.7%) aged 18 to 24, 14,834 people (29.0%) aged 25 to 44, 10,014 people (19.6%) aged 45 to 64, and 4,239 people (8.3%) who were 65 years of age or older. The median age was 29.2 years. For every 100 females, there were 99.2 males. For every 100 females age 18 and over, there were 98.2 males.

There were 14,089 housing units at an average density of 2,077.0 per square mile (801.9/km^{2}), of which 5,957 (44.0%) were owner-occupied, and 7,571 (56.0%) were occupied by renters. The homeowner vacancy rate was 1.9%; the rental vacancy rate was 2.5%. 21,365 people (41.7% of the population) lived in owner-occupied housing units and 29,306 people (57.2%) lived in rental housing units.

As reported by the 2007–2011 American Community Survey, the median income for a household in the city was $46,073, and the median income for a family was $49,550. Male full-time year-round workers had a median income of $31,758 versus $31,155 for females. The per capita income for the city was $16,407. About 18.6% of families and 20.4% of the population were below the poverty line, including 27.6% of those under age 18 and 15.6% of those age 65 or over. Therefore, although the median household income did rise significantly between 2000 and 2010 (unadjusted for inflation), the percentage of city residents experiencing poverty rose at a faster rate.

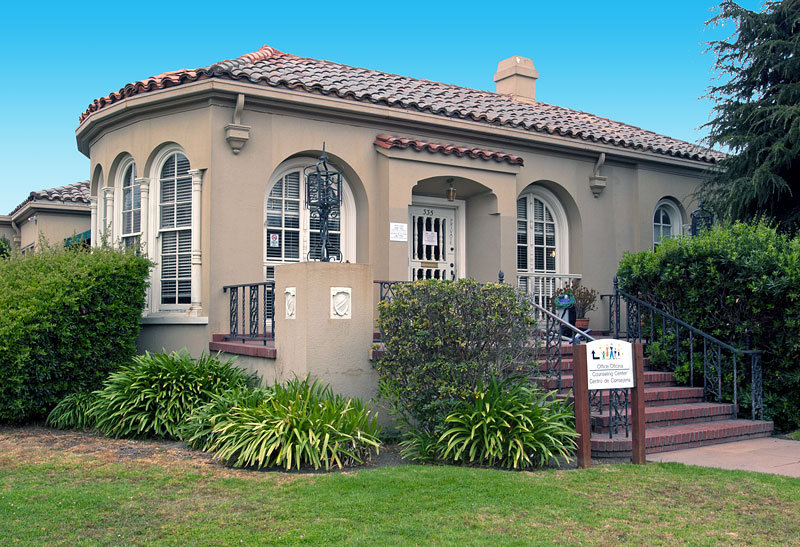
Mission Revival Madison House, built by W. H. Weeks in 1926

=== Asian Americans ===
Watsonville also has an Asian-American presence consisting of Chinese, Japanese and Filipinos despite the fact that the percentage of city residents of Asian descent has dropped since 1960. The Chinese, Japanese and Filipinos had residential sections and opened many businesses to serve their customer base in town during the mid 20th century. The history of East Asians in Watsonville dates back to the late 19th century and are involved in the local agricultural industry. It is presumed that as a result of Japanese-American internment during WWII, local farm companies began to attract Mexican migrant labor to the area in higher numbers and the town's racial-ethnic composition became more Hispanic in the 1980s and 1990s. There was also medium-sized Sikh population in Watsonville during the late 1990s to early 2000s that were involved mostly in the trucking industry, but most have moved away to the Central Valley for cheaper housing.

== Economy ==
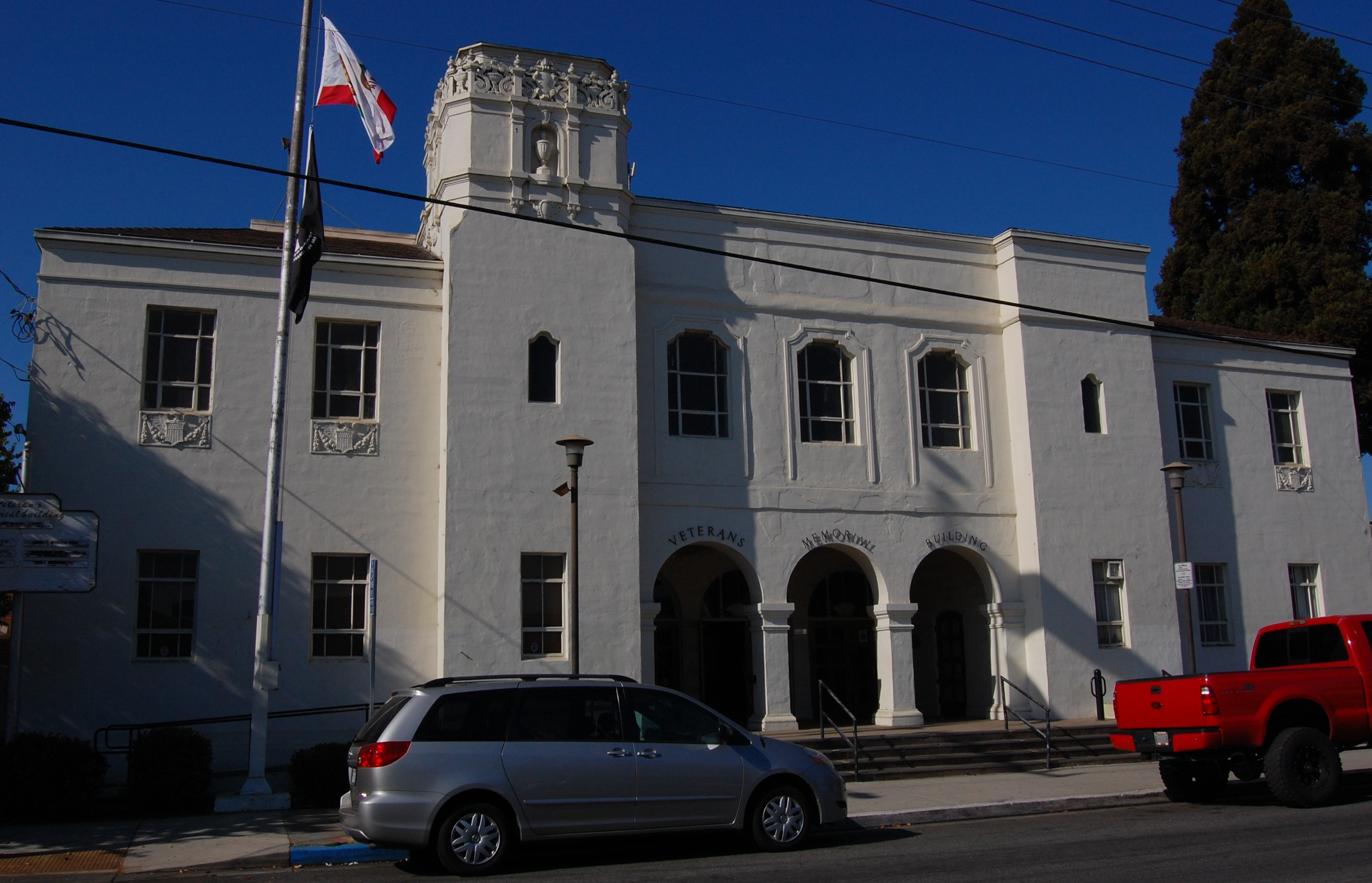
The Spanish Colonial Revival style Veterans Memorial Building, built 1934

Watsonville's main industries are construction, agriculture and manufacturing. Some of the largest companies headquartered in Watsonville are Monterey Mushrooms, Driscoll's, Martinelli's, Nordic Naturals, Graniterock, Granite Construction, West Marine, California Giant, A&I Transport Inc. and Orion Telescopes & Binoculars.

Watsonville is known for producing crops and goods in the agricultural business along the Northern Pacific Coast. Its economy depends on its agro-business market and on distributing crops to different parts of the world. Crops fundamental to the economy include strawberries, cauliflower, broccoli, lettuce, natural plants, and raspberries. Companies such as Driscoll's and California Giant spend approximately $280 million every year to process and transport fresh food to cities in the area, such as San Jose, Castroville, and Santa Cruz, where the availability of these fruits and vegetables do not meet the demand. The city ranks among the most important U.S. farming cities for its agro-business market.

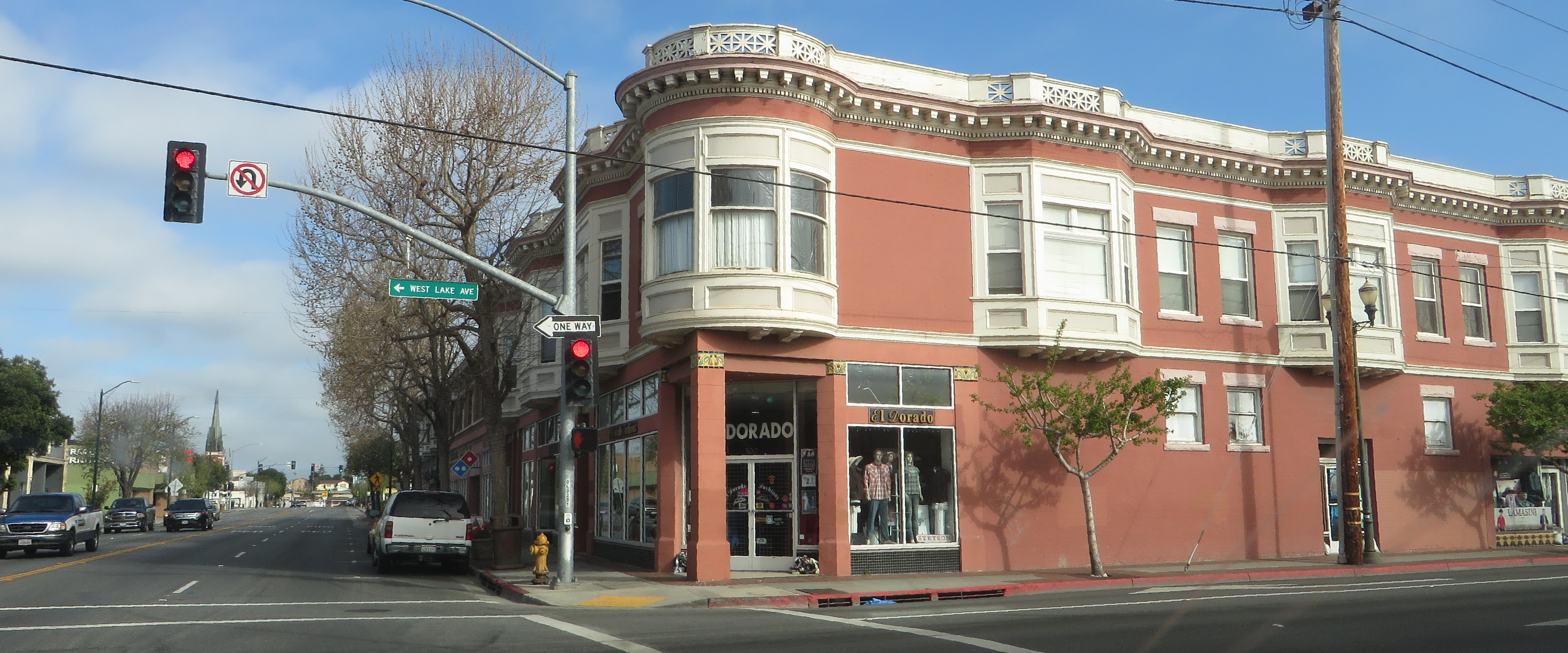
Shops of West Lake Ave

Watsonville is the nation's 21st-largest city in which Latino workers are 75% of the total population.

=== Top employers ===
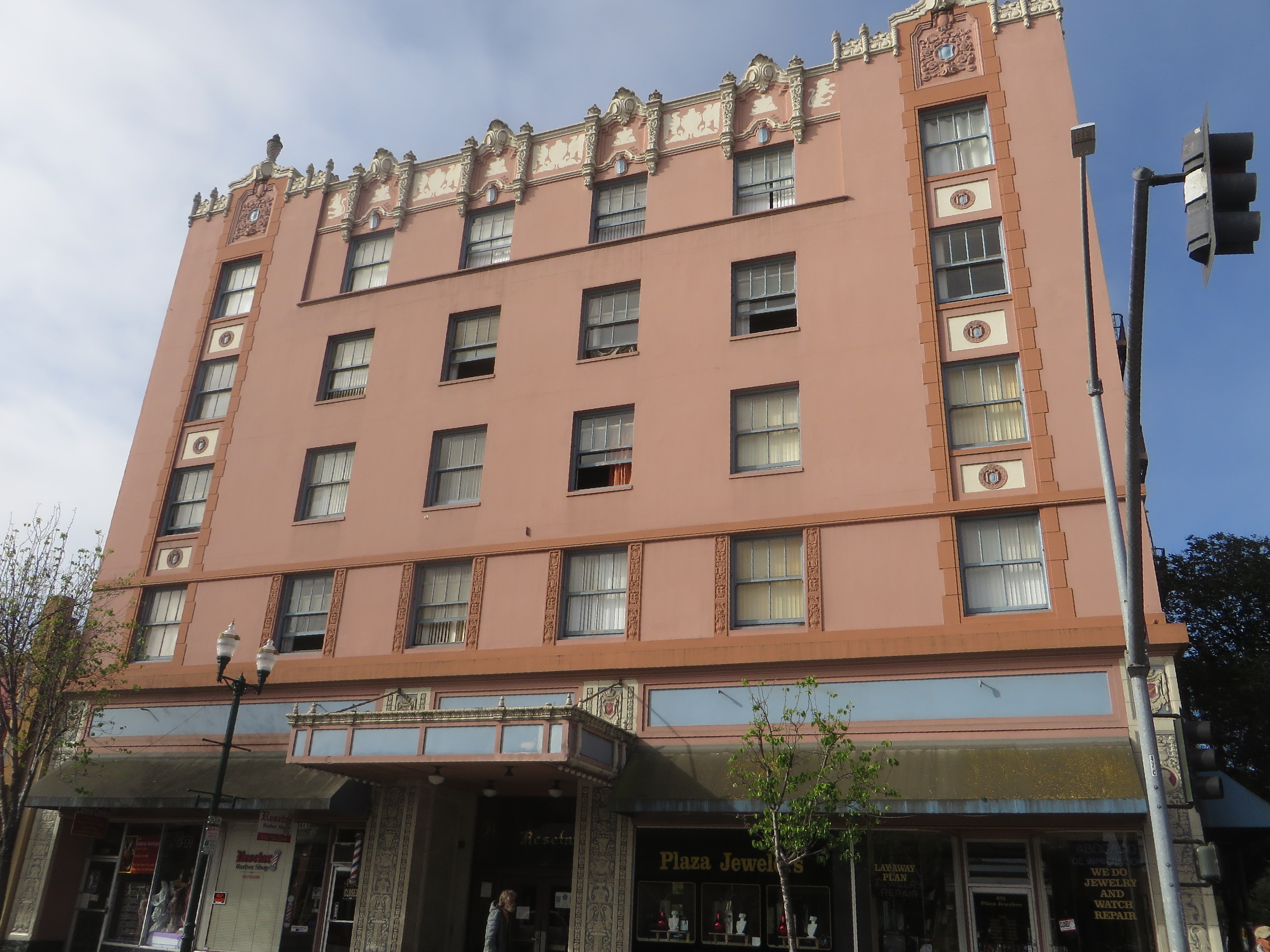
Spanish Colonial Revival architecture in Downtown Watsonville

According to the City of Watsonville's 2019 Comprehensive Annual Financial Report, the city's top employers are:

| # | Employer | # of Employees |
|---|---|---|
| 1 | Pajaro Valley Unified School District | 4,108 |
| 2 | Monterey Mushrooms Inc. | 870 |
| 3 | Watsonville Community Hospital | 591 |
| 4 | Granite Construction | 557 |
| 5 | Lakeside Organic Gardens LLC | 450 |
| 6 | City of Watsonville | 427 |
| 7 | Salud Para La Gente | 422 |
| 8 | S Martinelli & Co. | 290 |
| 9 | Fox Factory | 265 |
| 10 | West Marine Products | 247 |

== Parks and recreation ==
Watsonville maintains 28 parks, including a skate park, indoor soccer field, lake with boat rentals and RV camping, BBQ areas, handball courts, an art gallery, tennis courts, and volleyball courts. It also provides a wide variety of recreational opportunities, including hiking, boating, sports, bird-watching, and beach access.

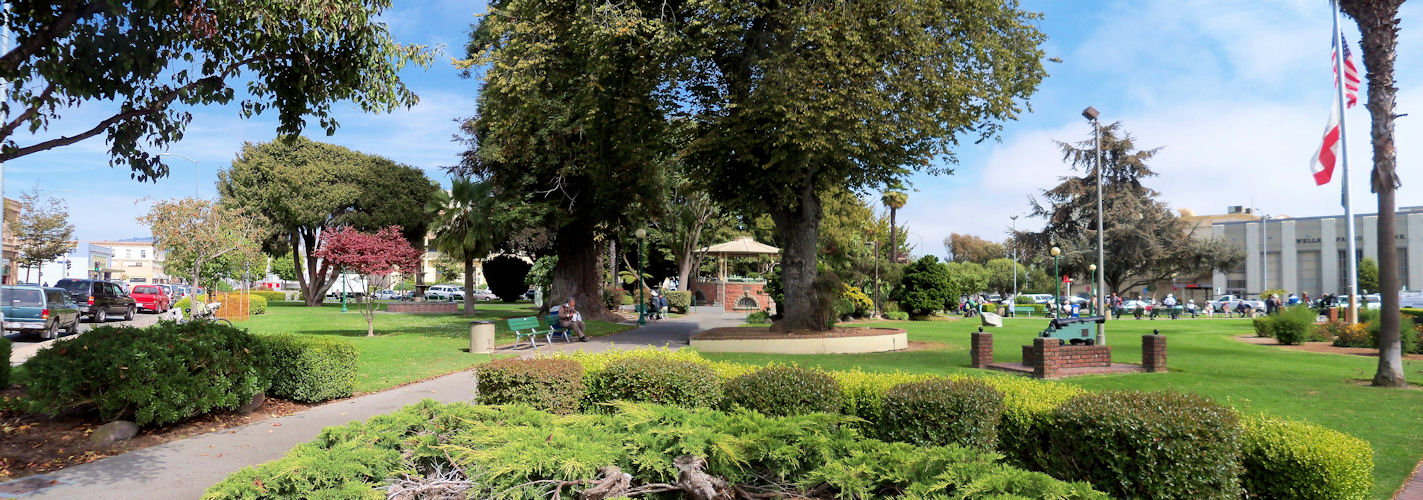
Watsonville Plaza, in the heart of downtown.

=== Watsonville Wetlands ===
There are hiking trails throughout the city, and a nature center provides an intimate view of The Watsonville Wetlands.

=== Pajaro River ===
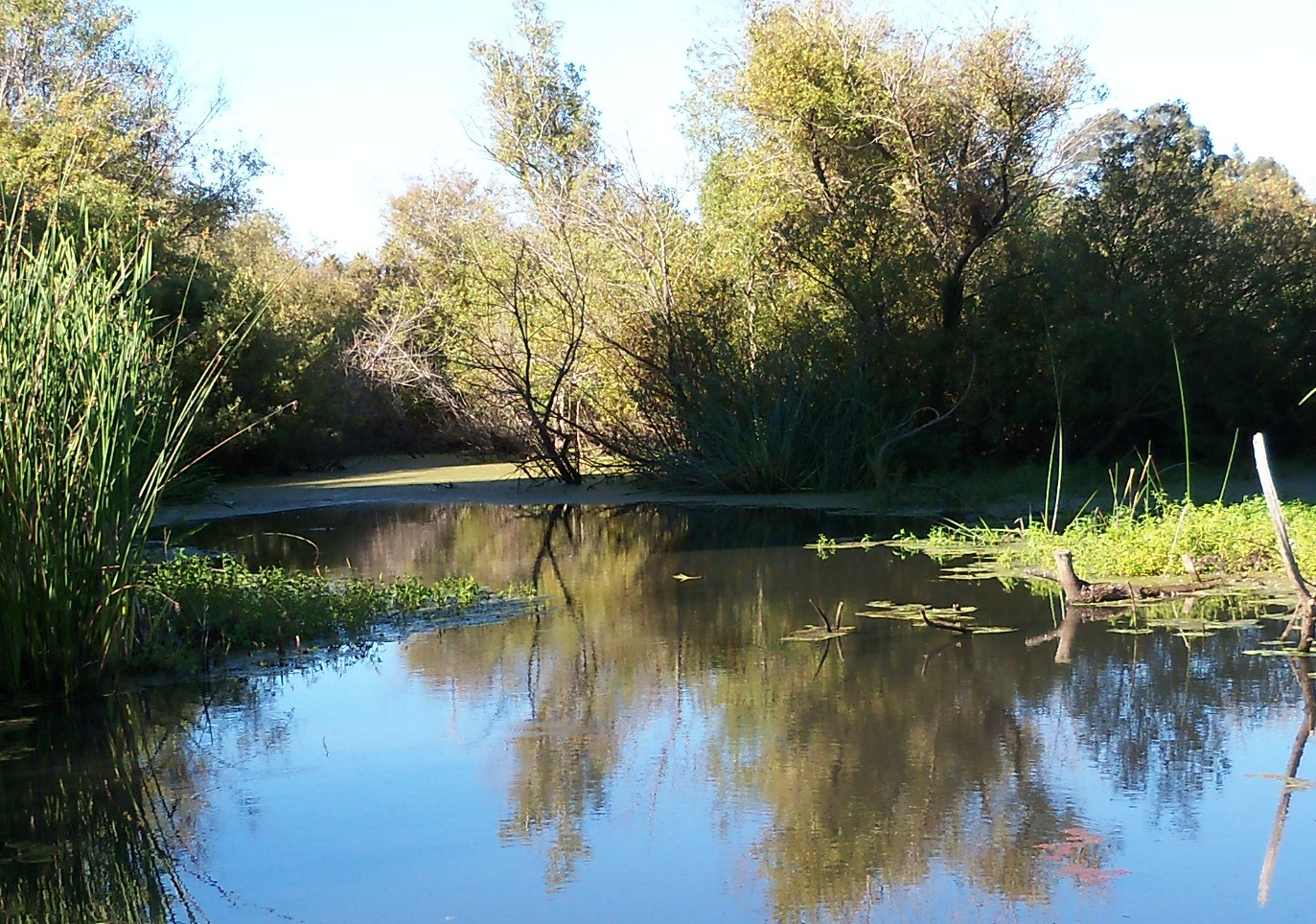
The Watsonville wetlands

There are several trailheads in the city that provide access to the Pajaro River and its tributaries via The Pajaro River Levee Trail Park. The levee trails are a popular spot for walking, running, and biking. In 2010, the City of Watsonville received a $424,000 grant to create a public access point to the Pajaro River for canoes and kayaks, including a parking lot, trail and public restroom.

=== Pinto Lake ===
The city operates one of two parks at Pinto Lake, which includes a small watercraft launch ramp, group picnic areas, an RV park, a baseball field, volleyball, children's playground, boat rentals, fishing, and bird watching. Because Pinto Lake often turns a thick green due to different types of algae, the city prohibits the eating of fish caught in Pinto Lake. The second park at Pinto Lake is operated by the County of Santa Cruz and includes nature trails, disc golf, sports fields, and the UC Master Gardeners of Monterey and Santa Cruz Counties's Demonstration Garden.

=== Pajaro Dunes ===
The Pajaro Dunes area of Watsonville attracts tourists to its high-end beachfront condos and timeshares.

== Culture ==
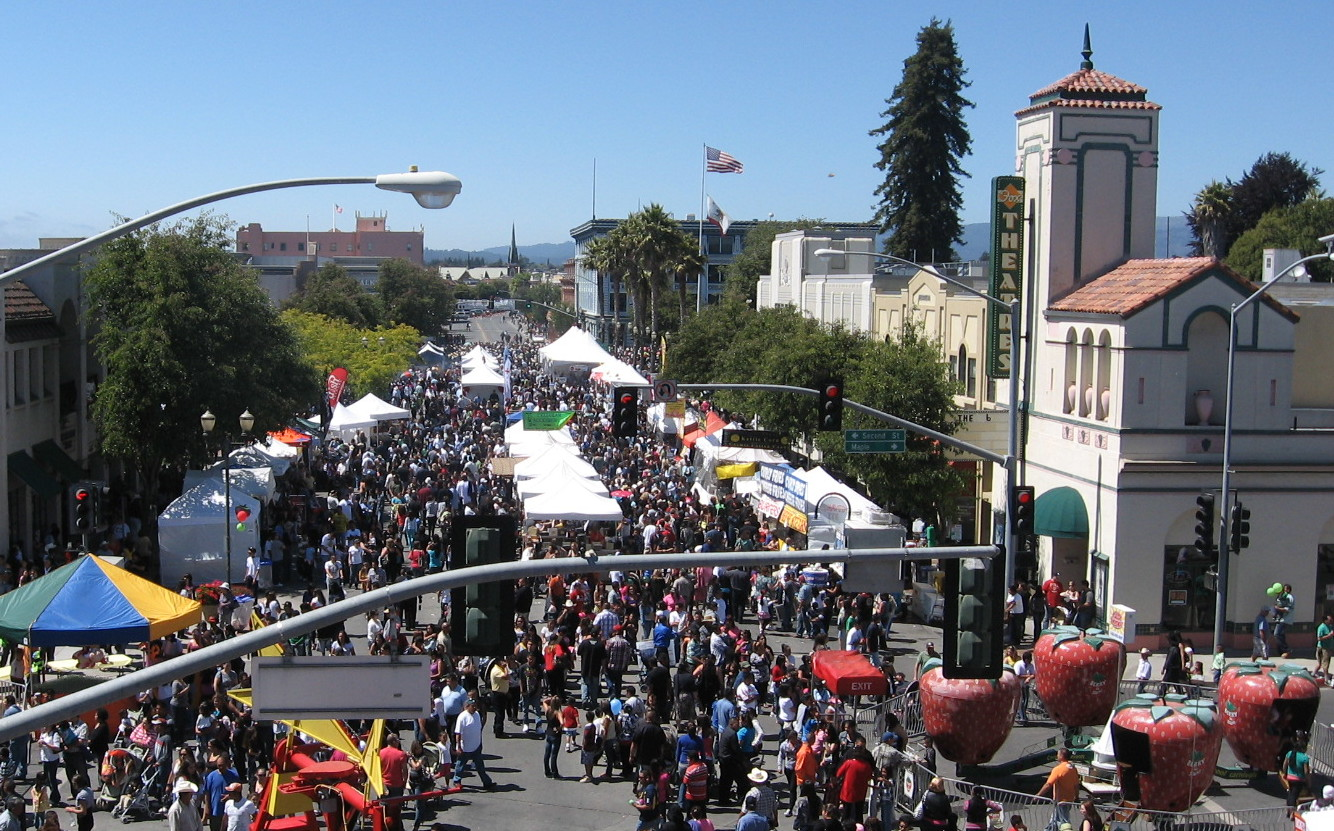
Watsonville Strawberry Festival

Watsonville is home to the annual Strawberry Festival, which includes a wide variety of strawberry-based foods, live music, vendors, and rides.

Near the end of every summer, the Santa Cruz County Fair draws visitors from across and outside the county to its attractions, including rides, food, art exhibits, flower exhibits, pony rides, petting zoos, dog shows, and live music performances.

The Santa Cruz County Fairgrounds host a number of other events, including car races at the Ocean Speedway, dog training programs, wedding receptions, the annual Santa Cruz County Science Fair, and the Scottish Renaissance Festival. The fairgrounds also host concerts and trade shows. Notable past performers include Whitesnake, Dio, and Joan Jett.

== Government ==
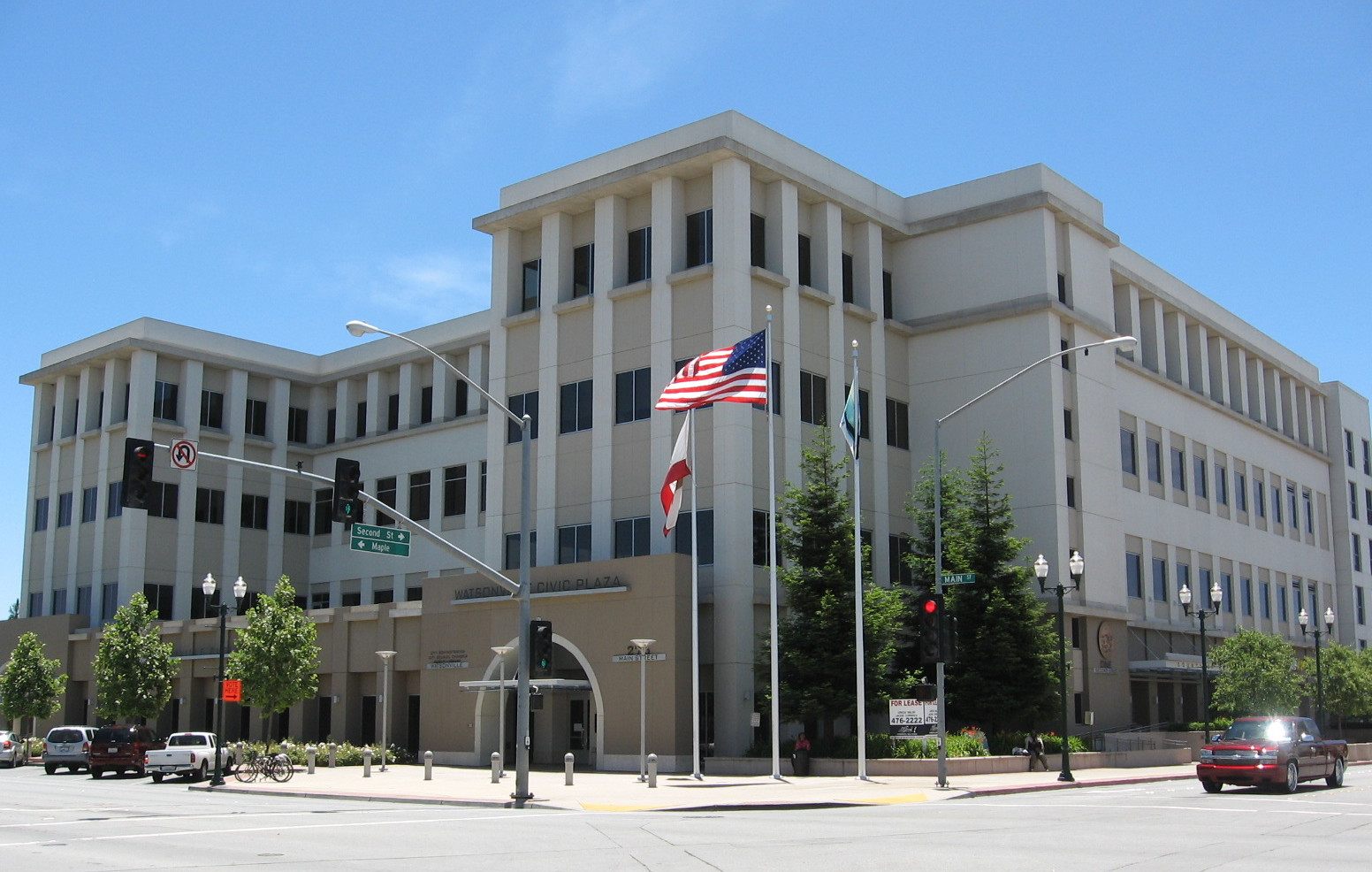
Watsonville City Hall

Watsonville uses the council–manager government model. The city is divided into seven districts, each of which elects a representative to the city council. The mayor is not elected; the office rotates annually in December. As of 2026, the mayor is Kristal Salcido.

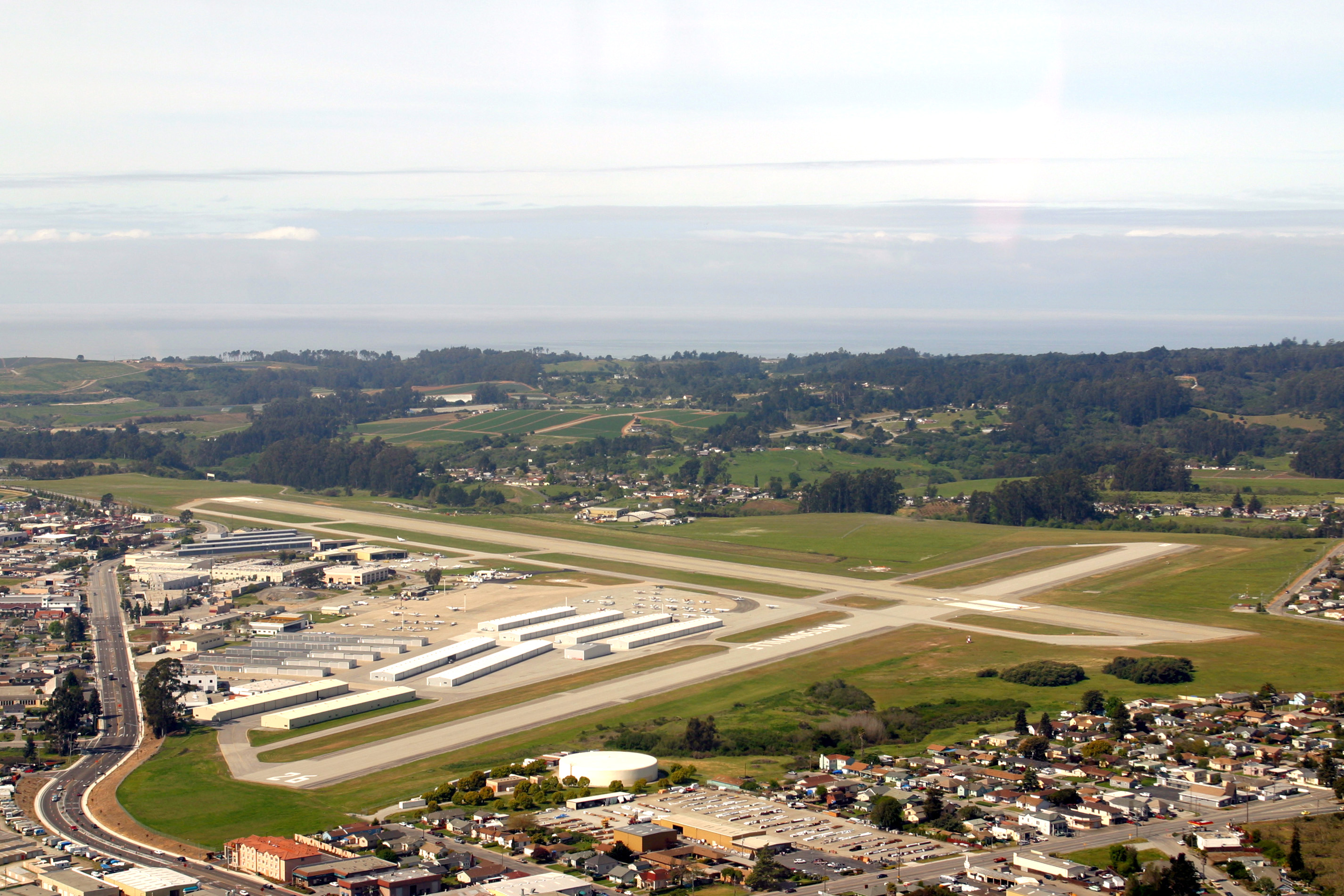
Watsonville Municipal Airport

Watsonville became a sanctuary city on April 11, 2017.

Watsonville's overall crime index is 24.1% lower than Santa Cruz's, 15.4% lower than Salinas's, and 38.4% higher than Gilroy's.

=== State and federal representation ===
In the California State Legislature, Watsonville is in the 17th senatorial district, represented by Democrat John Laird, and the 29th Assembly district, represented by Democrat Robert Rivas.

In the United States House of Representatives, Watsonville is in California's 18th congressional district, represented by Democrat Zoe Lofgren.

== Education ==
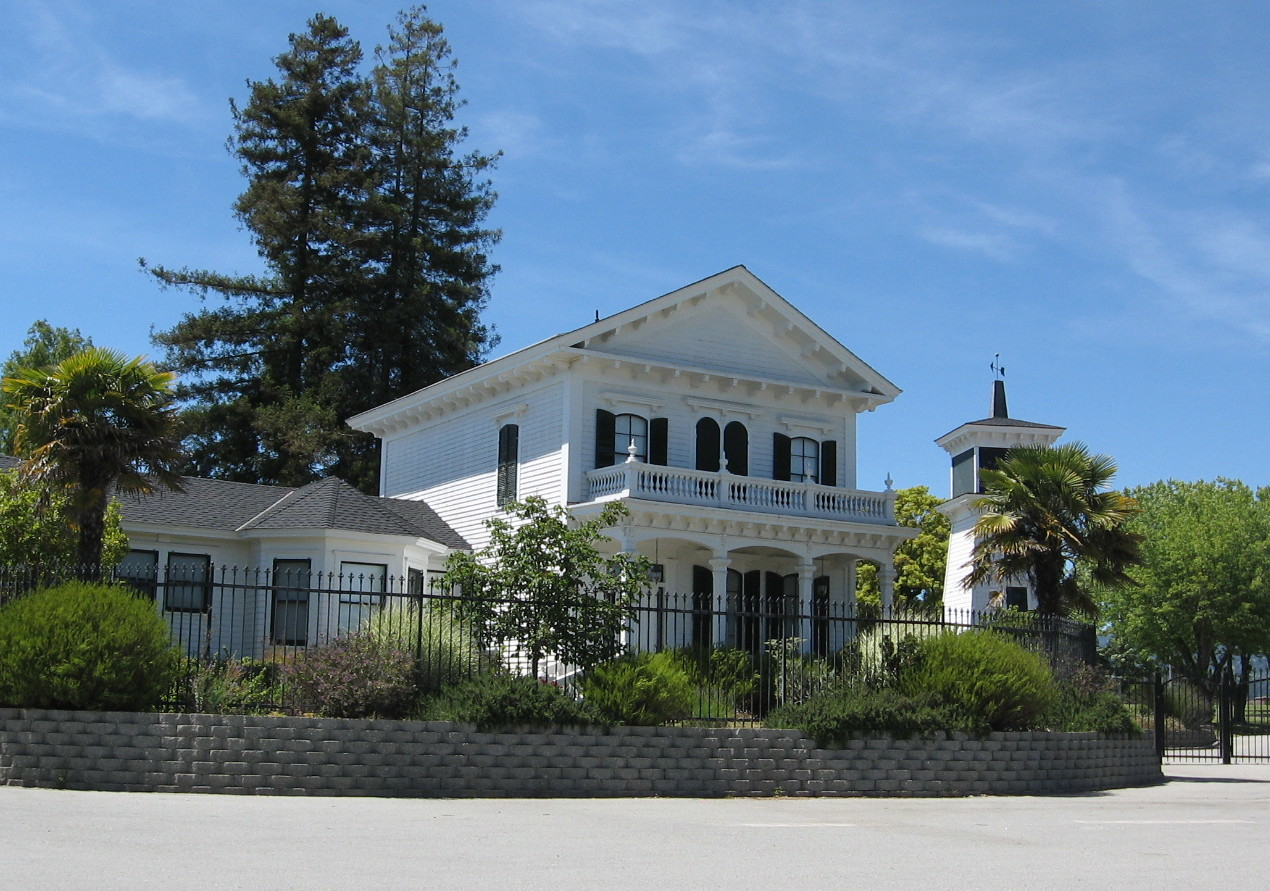
The Rodgers House, built c. 1870s

Watsonville's public schools fall under the jurisdiction of the Pajaro Valley Unified School District, which has an enrollment of about 18,000 students in kindergarten through 12th grades. Local high schools include Watsonville High School and Pajaro Valley High School.

Cabrillo College operates a branch campus in Watsonville.

Most charter schools in Watsonville are under the jurisdiction of the Pajaro Valley Unified School District. They include Diamond Technology Institute, Alianza Charter School, Linscott Charter School, Pacific Coast Charter School, Watsonville Charter School of the Arts, and Ceiba College Preparatory Academy, with the exception of Watsonville Prep School, a proposed TK-8 charter school operated which is operated by Navigator Schools.

Private schools in the city include Green Valley Christian School, Moreland Notre Dame, Monte Vista Christian, Mount Madonna School, Potter's House Community Christian School, St. Francis Central Coast Catholic High School, and Salesian Elementary and Junior High Schools.

== Media ==
Watsonville and the surrounding area is served by the local newspaper, The Pajaronian. KQET operates in Watsonville as a simulcast of the Bay Areas's KQED.

Radio stations based in Watsonville include KSCO, KLVM, KAPU, and KPIG-FM.

== Notable people ==
- Donald Barnhouse, Christian preacher, pastor, theologian, radio pioneer, and writer
- Tony Carey, musician, composer
- Jaime Cortez, Chicano novelist and LGBT activist
- Glen Gondo, businessman and founder of the Japan Festival of Houston
- Annie Law, conchologist
- James A. Linscott (1846–1913), lumberman, politician
- Luke Keaschall, baseball player
- Laurie R. King, author
- Marv Marinovich, football player and coach
- Charlene Pryer, baseball player
- Ty Sambrailo, football player
- Ken Sears, professional basketball player
- Todd Souza, racing driver
- Cody Webb, motorcycle racer
- Adrián Zamora, basketball player

== Sister cities ==
Watsonville's sister cities are:

- Velas, Sáo Jorge Island, Azore Islands, Portugal
- Cavtat, Croatia
- Jocotepec, Mexico
- Kawakami, Japan
- Pinghu, China
- San Pedro Masahuat, El Salvador
- Tangancícuaro, Mexico

== See also ==
- Wild Farm Alliance
