= Minyo Crusaders =

Japanese musical ensemble

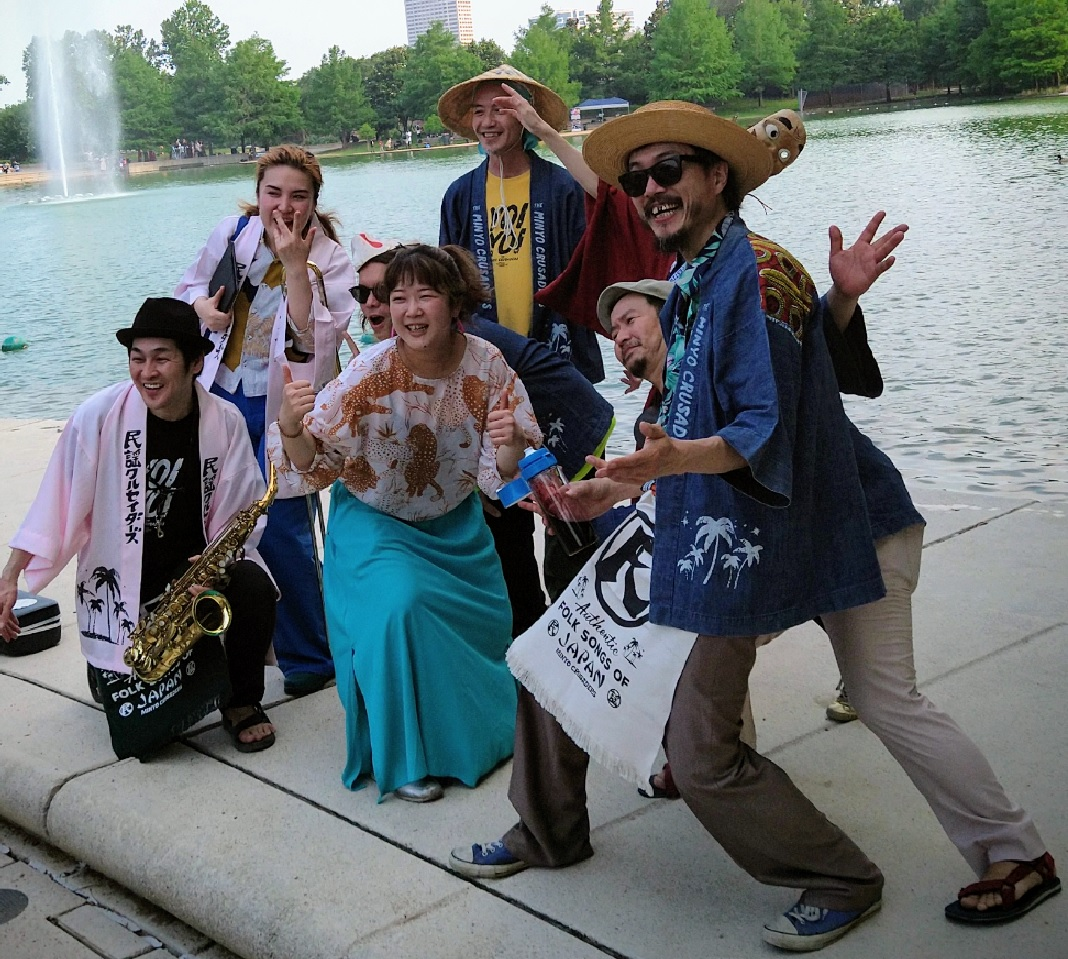
- The ensemble after performing at the 2023 Japan Festival

Background information
- Origin: Fussa City, Tokyo, Japan
- Genres: Min'yō; Caribbean; Latin; African; World music
- Years active: 2011–present
- Labels: Mais Um; P-Vine Records; Universal Music Japan
- Members: Fready Tsukamoto（vocals）; Katsumi Tanaka（guitar）; Moe（keys）; Koichiro Osawa（sax）; Sono（timbales）; Mutsumi Kobayashi (bongos and percussions）; Irochi（congas）
- Past members: DADDY U（b）; Meg（vocals, pianica）; Yamauchi Stephan（tp）; Shoji Ishiguro（b）
- Website: minyocrusaders.com

Minyo Crusaders (Japanese: 民謡クルセイダーズ) is a Japanese musical group that reworks traditional Japanese folk songs (min'yō) with arrangements inspired by various international music genres, including Caribbean, Latin and African music. The group was co-founded by Katsumi Tanaka and Freddie Tsukamoto, with the goal of reviving min'yō as a "music for the people".

The pair played casually around Fussa for a number of years, with an assortment of musicians dropping in and out and eventually including Fussa "drumming legend" Sono. The turning point came when Tokyo roots scene veteran DADDY U joined the band as bass player and provided connections to a varied pool of musicians working across Tokyo. Through him, the rest of the band was introduced.

They released their first album, Echoes of Japan, in 2017 on P-Vine Records. In the album, the Minyo Crusaders attempt to bring Min'yo back to its 'common man' origins, going against the recent trend that Min'yo at-large had of appealing to the upper classes despite its working class roots. The album was later reissued on Mais Um in 2019.

== Members ==
The band's official Facebook page announced on 27 December 2019 that DADDY U was having difficulty touring and had played his last concert with the Minyo Crusaders.

On December 11, 2023, Meg announced via twitter that she would be leaving the Minyo Crusaders.

=== Support Members ===
Several musicians play and tour with the band regularly, some for several years, but are credited as "support members".

These include: Midori Takenoko (vo, musical accompaniment), Toshio ‘Digi’ Fujino (bass), Yusuke Noguchi (trumpet), Kayoko Yuasa (trombone), Madokorona Oya (congas).

== Discography ==
=== Studio albums ===
Title	Album details
Echoes of Japan (エコーズ・オブ・ジャパン)	Released: 6 December 2017; Label: P-Vine Records; Formats: CD, vinyl, digital download
Live at Le Guess Who?	Released: 9 July 2021; Label: Mais Um Discos; Formats: digital download
Tour of Japan (日本民謡珍道中)	Released: 24 November 2023; Label: Universal Music Japan; Formats: CD

=== EPs ===
Title	Album details
Minyo Cumbiero (From Tokyo to Bogota)	Released: 6 August 2020; Label: Mais Um Records; Formats: digital download; with: Frente Cumbiero
