= Santa Cruz County Science and Engineering Fair =

The Santa Cruz County Science and Engineering Fair, previously known as the Santa Cruz County Science Fair, is a science fair held annually at the Santa Cruz County Fairgrounds. The top 10 students from elementary and junior high schools in Santa Cruz County are invited to participate, and high school students can enter projects into the fair without competing at their school science fair. The primary sponsor of the fair in 2019 was Plantronics, although the fair receives donations and volunteer judges from many local businesses and educational institutions.

Students from the Santa Cruz County Science and Engineering Fair have been very successful at the California State Science Fair. Santa Cruz County was allocated 38 projects in 2019.

Beginning in 2023, the event moved beyond the traditional science and engineering fair model to fully embrace the "arts" and "math" components of STEAM education.
