= Min'yō =

Traditional Japanese music

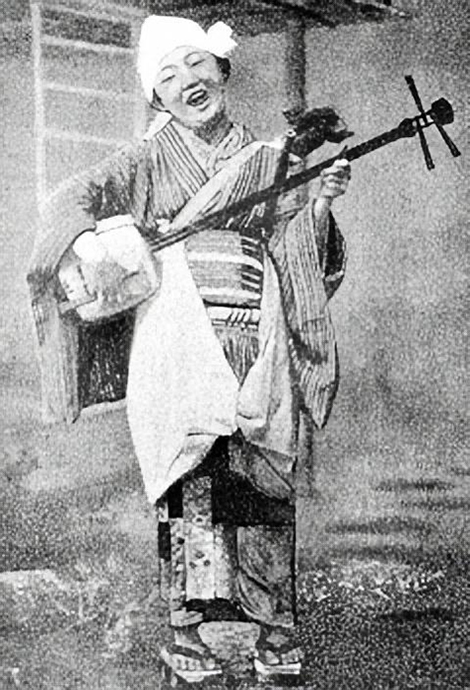
A Japanese folkswoman with her shamisen, 1904

Min'yō (民謡), Nihon min'yō, Japanese min'yō or Japanese folk music is a genre of traditional Japanese music.

== Characteristics ==
=== Styles ===
Many min'yō are connected to forms of work or to specific trades and were originally sung between work or for specific jobs. Other min'yō function simply as entertainment, as dance accompaniment, or as a components of religious rituals.

Min'yō are also distinct depending on the area of Japan, with each area boasting its own favorite songs and styles. The songs found in the far northern island of Hokkaidō and sung by the Ainu people are usually excluded from the category of min'yō. In the far south, (especially Okinawa) distinct genres of min'yō, differing in scale structure, language and textual forms, have developed as well.

=== Instruments ===
Most Japanese folk songs related to work were originally sung unaccompanied, either solo, or by groups (heterophonically). During the Edo period, however, and sometimes later as well, accompaniment on shamisen, shakuhachi and/or shinobue was added to min'yō melodies. Percussion instruments, especially drums, are also often featured in min'yō accompaniment, especially when such songs are used in dances or religious ceremonies. Some of these accompaniments, in turn, have become independent, spawning solo instrumental genres such as Tsugaru-jamisen. Enka and many other popular genres are also rooted in min'yō.

== In contemporary Japan ==
During the 20th century many songs have been altered to become highly virtuosic melodies that can only be negotiated with much time and effort. Indeed, min'yō is now in effect a form of art music, often studied under professional teachers who may grant their leading students licenses and professional names.

At the same time, in contrast to the "stage min'yō" of such professionals, many hundreds of "preservation societies" (hozonkai) have been established to help songs survive in their more traditional forms. Thus work songs may be sung unaccompanied, perhaps while imitating or enacting the original actions of the work. Most of these Preservation Societies "preserve" only one local song.

There are also hundreds of min'yō contests, both national and local, again often for only one song.

For many Japanese, min'yō evokes, or is said to evoke, a nostalgia for real or imagined home towns and family; hence the saying common among practitioners and fans of the genre: "Folk song is the heart's home town" / "Min'yō wa kokoro no furusato".

Min'yō, traditional Japanese folk song, must be distinguished from what the Japanese call fōku songu, from the English phrase 'folk song'. These are Western-style songs, often guitar-accompanied and generally recently composed, of the type associated with Bob Dylan, Peter, Paul and Mary and the like, and popular in Japan since the 1960s. There is little contact between these two worlds, min'yō and fōku songu.

== Etymology ==
The word min'yō is a compound word of 'folk, the people' (民; min) and 'song' (謡, yō). In East Asia, the word is found in Chinese sources since the fifth century. In Japan, the first record of its usage is found in 901 AD. However, the word had only one incidence until 1890. For that reason, min'yō is considered a calque of the German word Volkslied (folk song), after the Meiji Restoration followed by the Westernization of the music. Min'yō replaced the word, riyō, that was widely used before the Second World War and means 'songs of the local people'.

Japanese traditional designations referring to more or less the same genre include inaka bushi ("country song") inaka buri ("country tune"), hina uta ("rural song") and the like, but for most of the people who sang such songs they were simply uta (song). The term min'yō is now sometimes also used to refer to traditional songs of other countries, though a preceding adjective is needed: Furansu min'yō = French folk song; for this reason, many sources in Japanese also feel the need to preface the term with "Nihon": Nihon min'yō = Japanese [traditional] folk song.

== Recordings ==
In Japan, different efforts have done to register and preserve Japanese folk music. Between 1944 and 1989, Machida Kashō edited a thirteen-volume of Japanese min'yō called Nihon min'yō taikan, which remained for several years as the most complete study of the genre.

In the 1970s, the Ministry of Culture of Japan planned a survey of Japanese folk music that results in the collection called "Emergency Folk Song Survey" (Min'yō kinkyū chōsa). The project was funded by prefectural and national levels of government. In 1994, the collection had been recorded more than 50 000 songs and variants.

== See also ==
- Chindon'ya
- Kokyū
- Minyo Crusaders, a Japanese musical group
- Shakuhachi
- Shamisen
- Tsugaru-jamisen
- Tanpura, an Indian musical instrument
- Warabe uta, traditional Japanese children rhythms. A form of Min'yō.
