= Japan America Society of Houston =

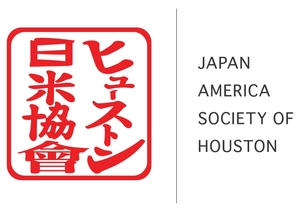
- Founded: May 19, 1968
- Type: Educational
- Purpose: Education
- Location: 4543 Post Oak Pl Dr #220, Houston, TX
- Region served: Houston, TX
- Method: Film screenings, Lectures, Symposia, Cultural lectures, Workshops
- Key people: JASH Officers Laird Doran, President JASH Staff Patsy Y. Brown, Executive Director Lauren Hurley, Administrative Assistant Ikuyo Katayama, Membership & Volunteer Secretary
- Revenue: null
- Endowment: null
- Website: http://www.jas-hou.org/

The Japan America Society of Houston is an educational society established in Houston, Texas on May 19, 1968. its mission is "To bring the people of the United States and Japan closer together in appreciation and understanding of each other". It does this through film screenings, lectures, symposia, cultural lectures, and workshops.
