= 2024 deaths in the United States (July–September) =

- Decades: 2000s; 2010s; 2020s; 2030s
- See also: History of the United States (2016–present); Timeline of United States history (2010–present); List of years in the United States

The following notable deaths in the United States occurred in July–September 2024. Names are reported under the date of death, in alphabetical order as set out in WP:NAMESORT. A typical entry reports information in the following sequence: Name, age, country of citizenship at birth and subsequent nationality (if applicable), what subject was noted for, year of birth (if known), and reference.

== July ==
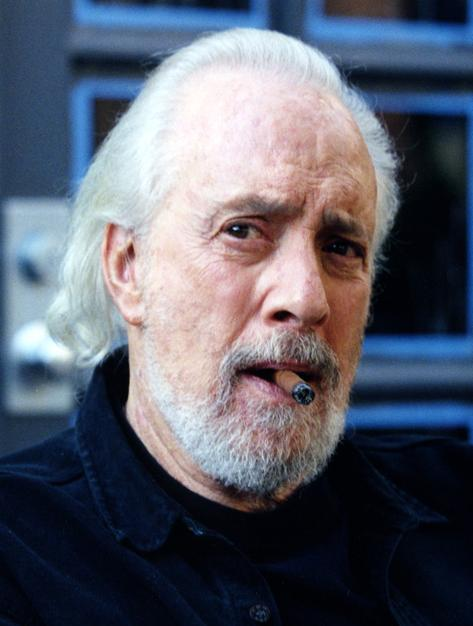
Robert Towne

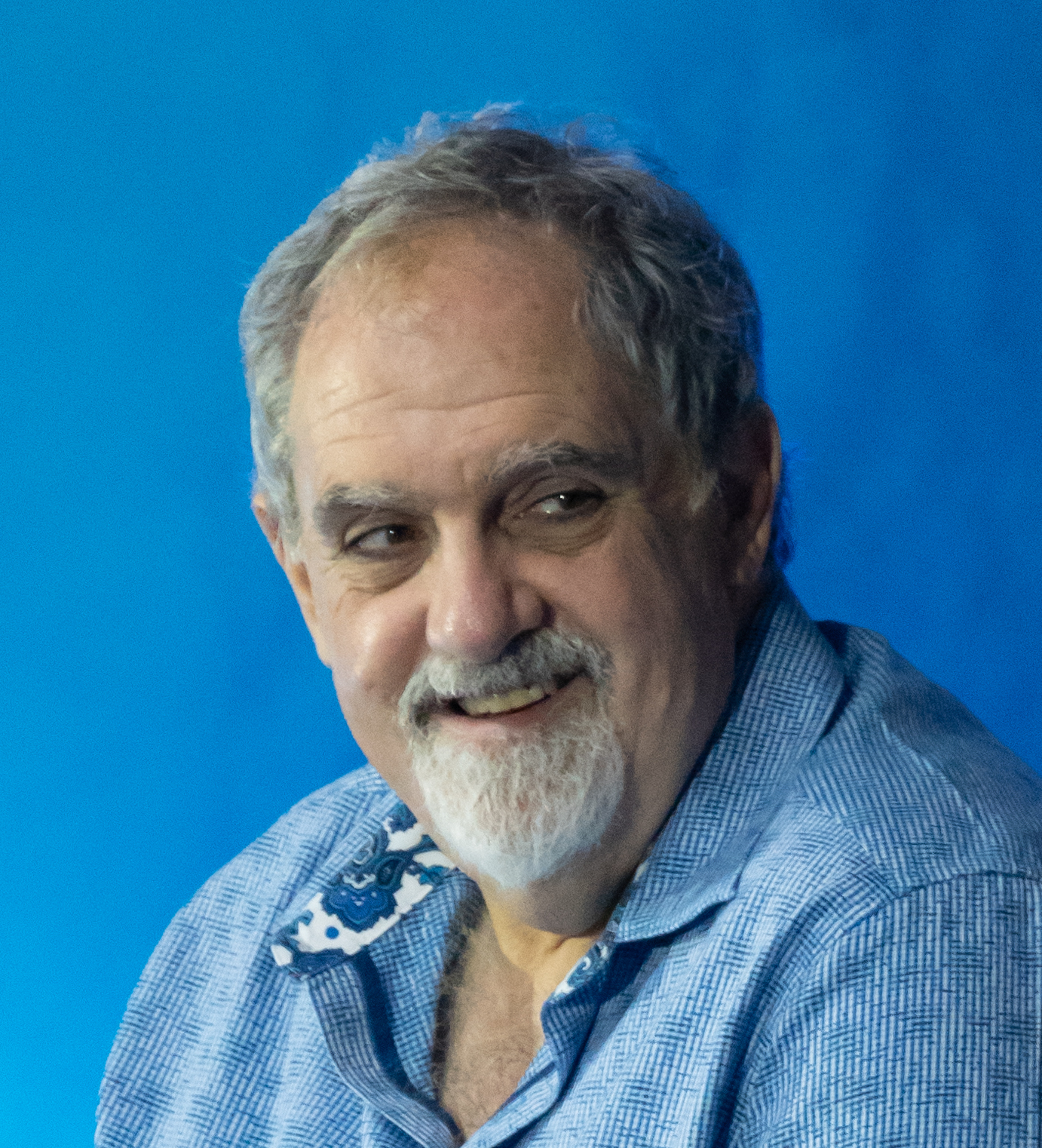
Jon Landau

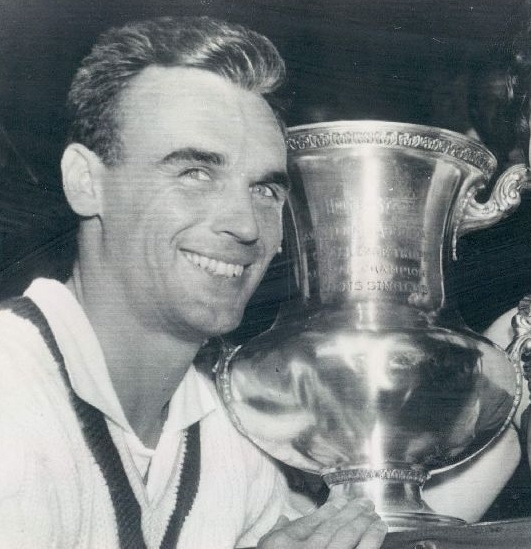
Vic Seixas

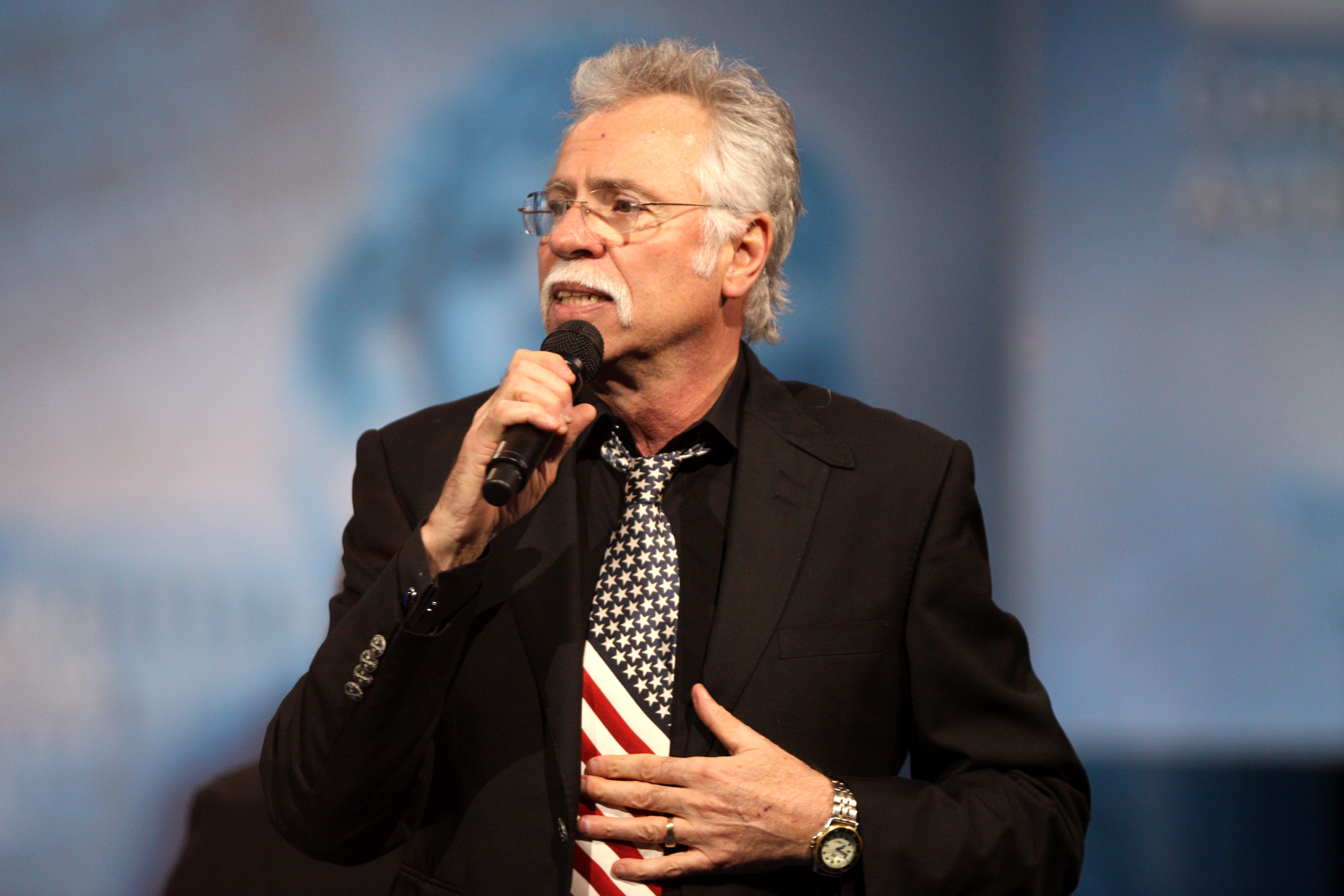
Joe Bonsall

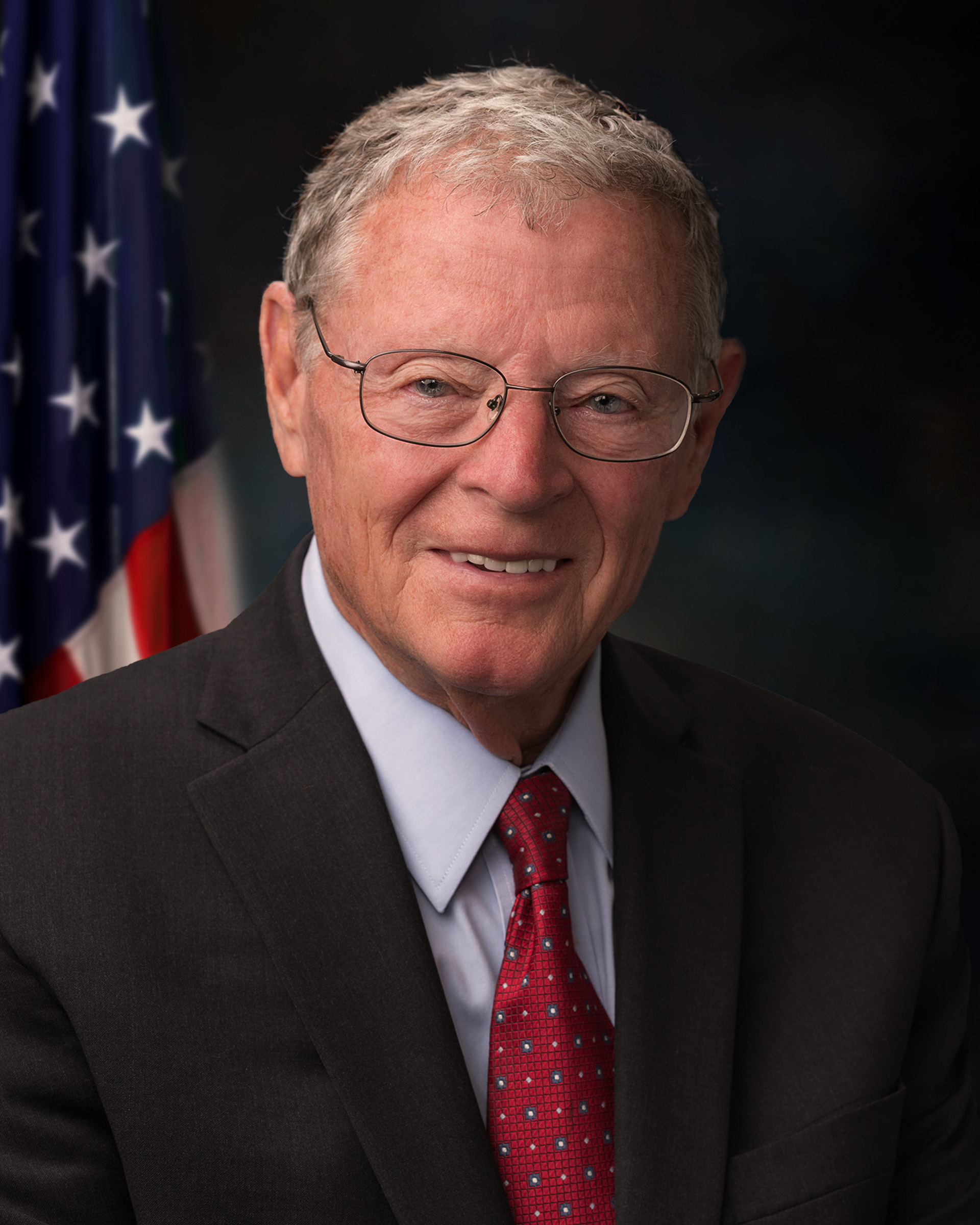
Jim Inhofe

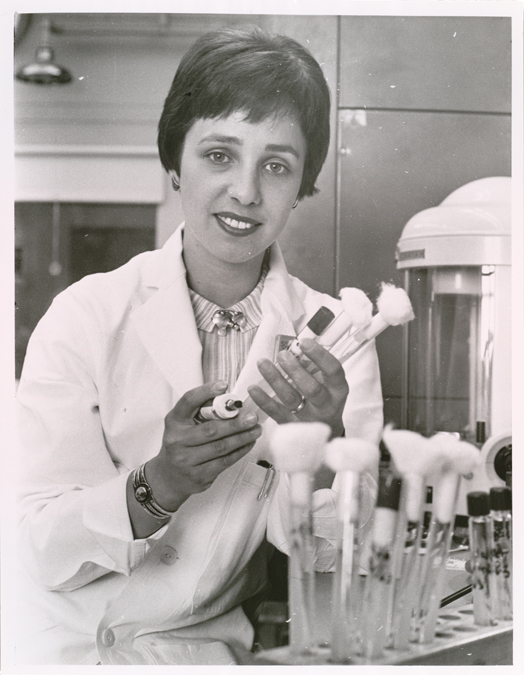
Maxine Singer

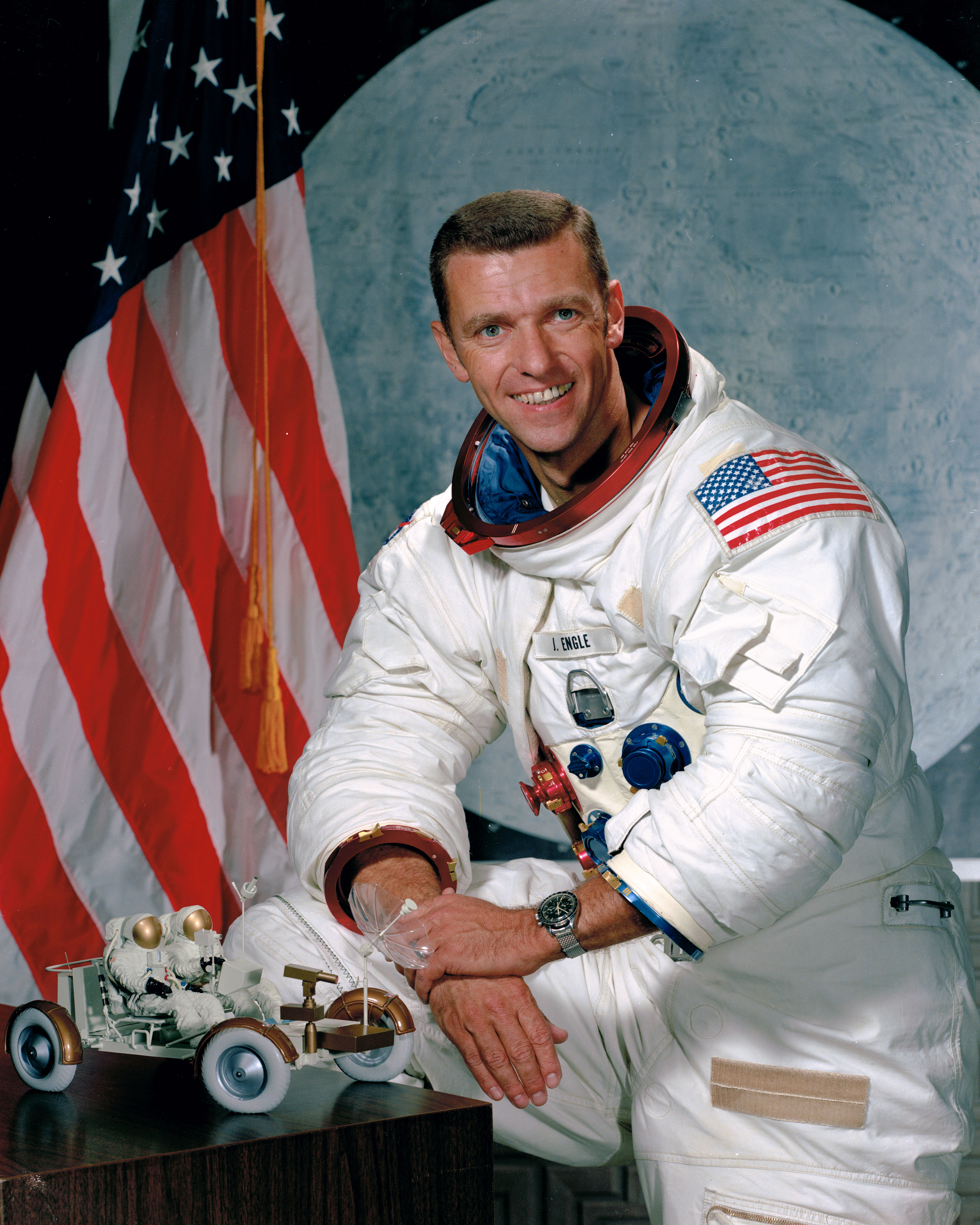
Joe Engle

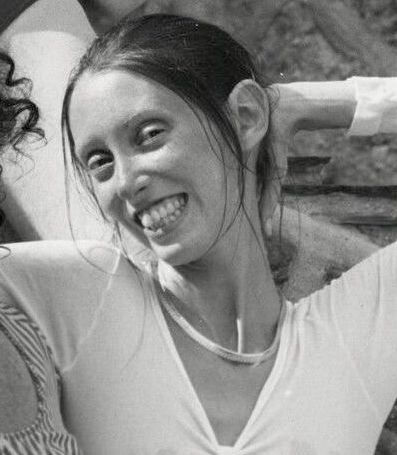
Shelley Duvall

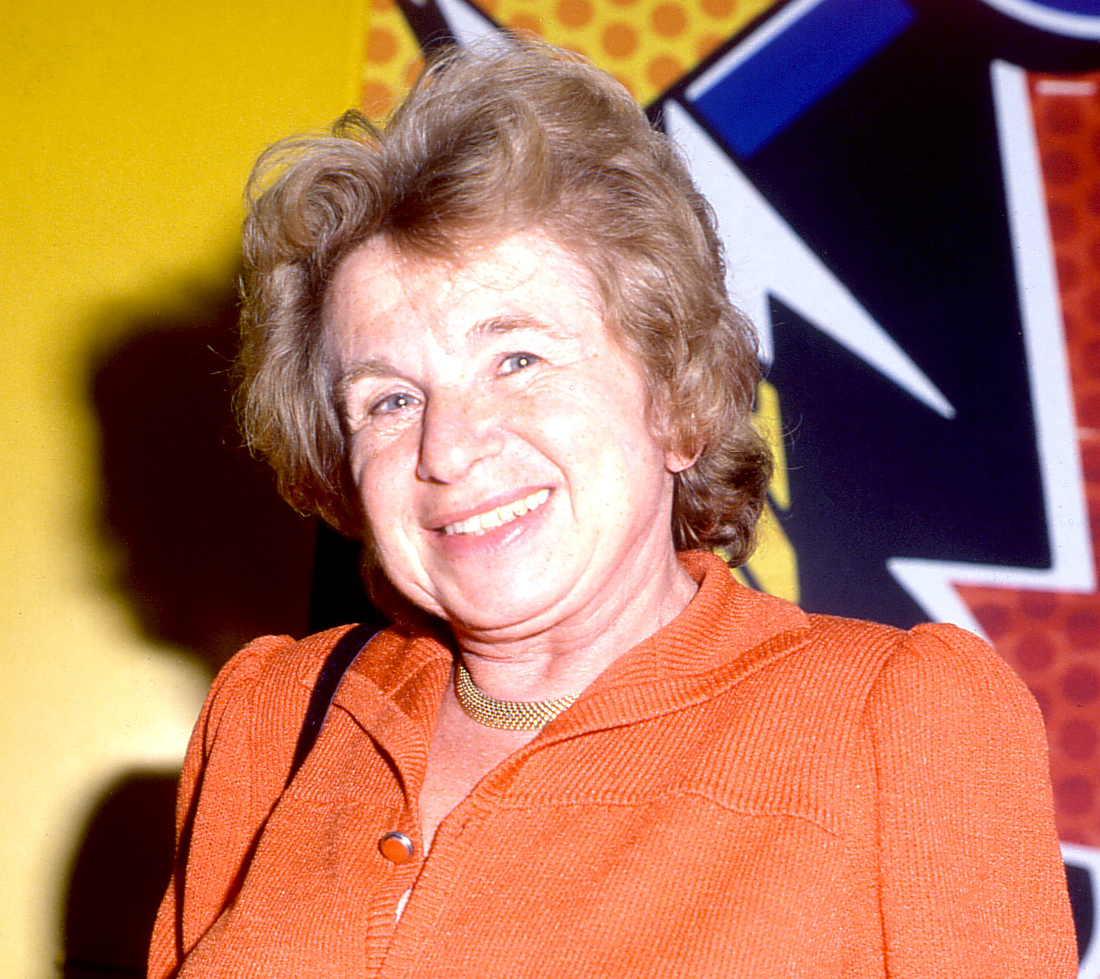
Ruth Westheimer

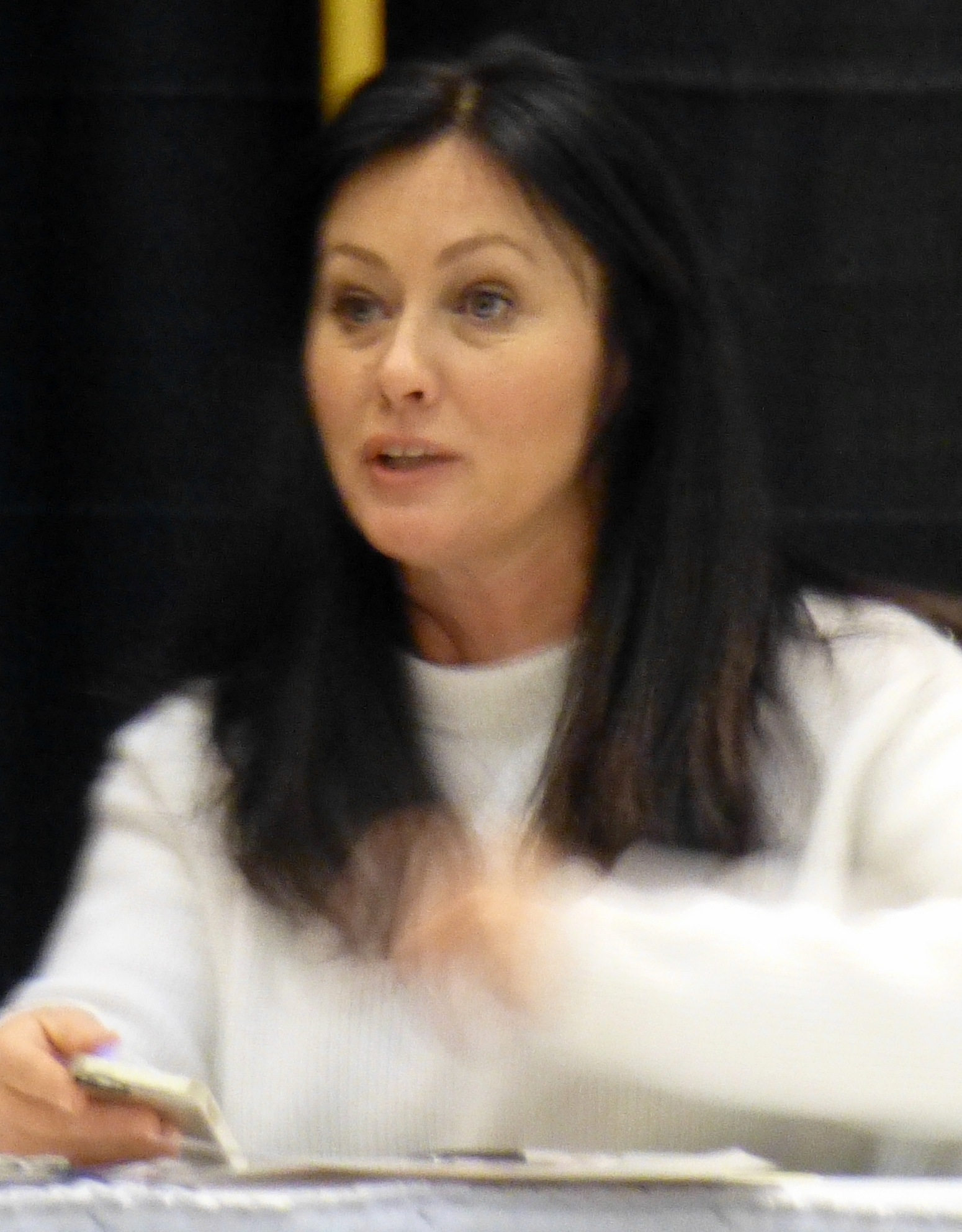
Shannen Doherty

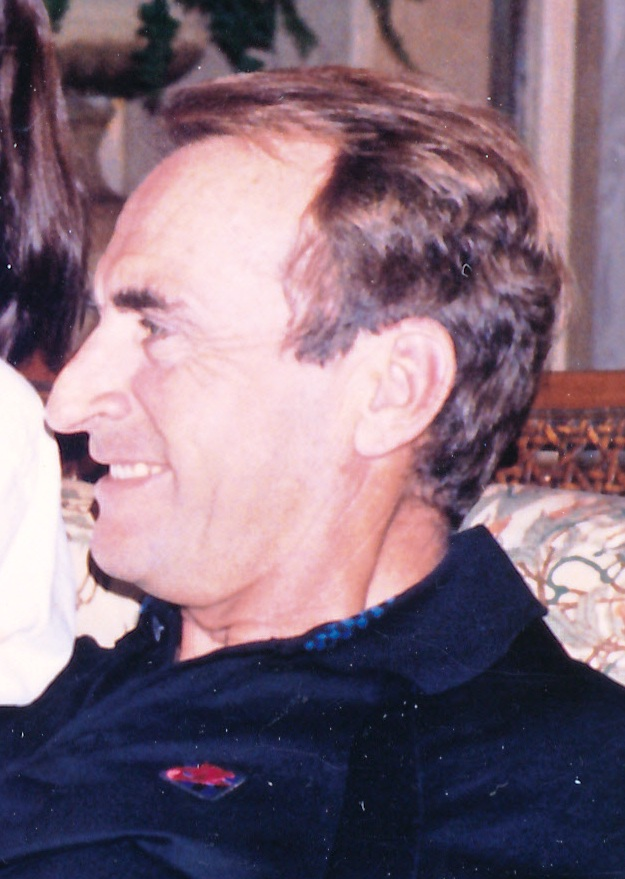
James B. Sikking

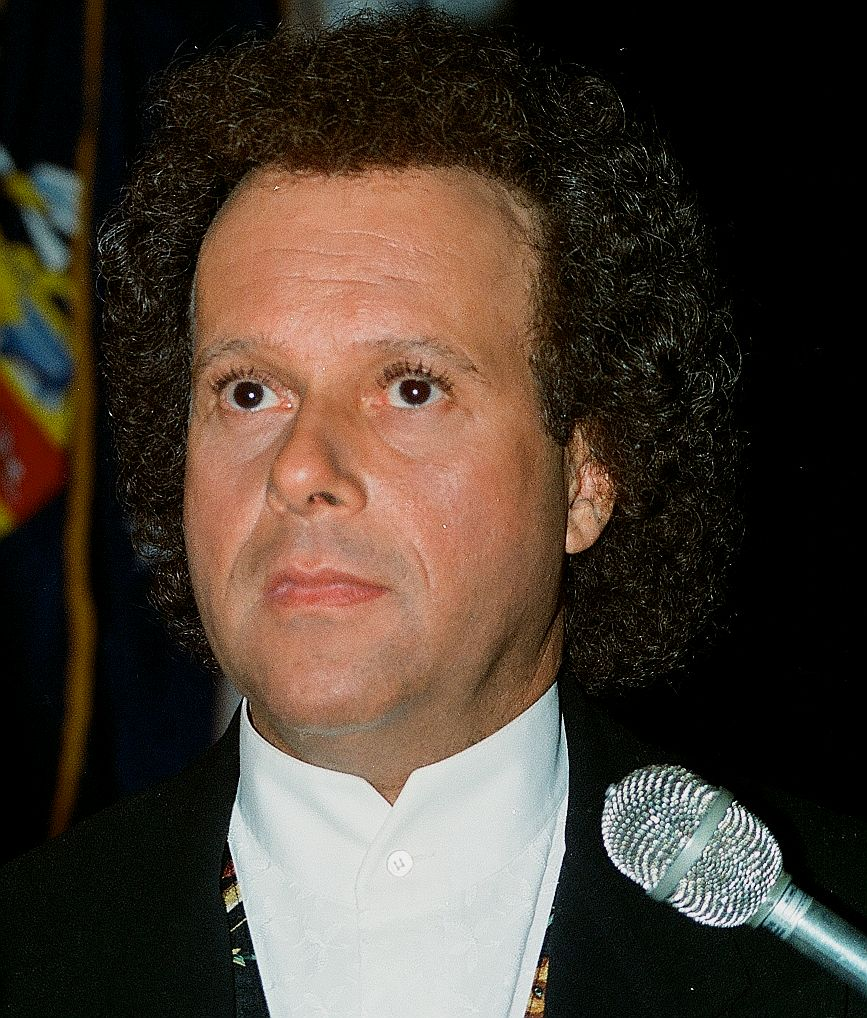
Richard Simmons

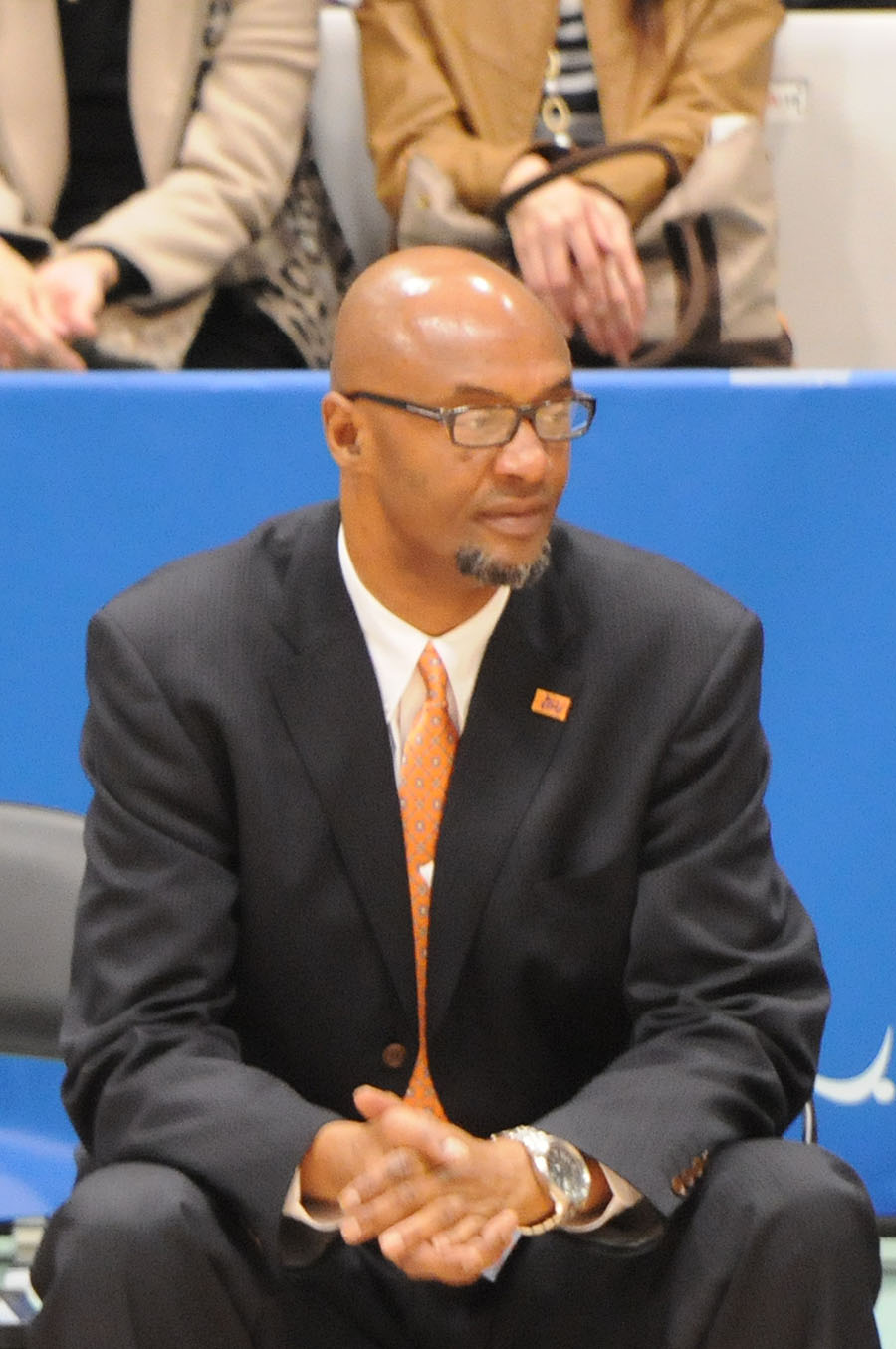
Joe Bryant

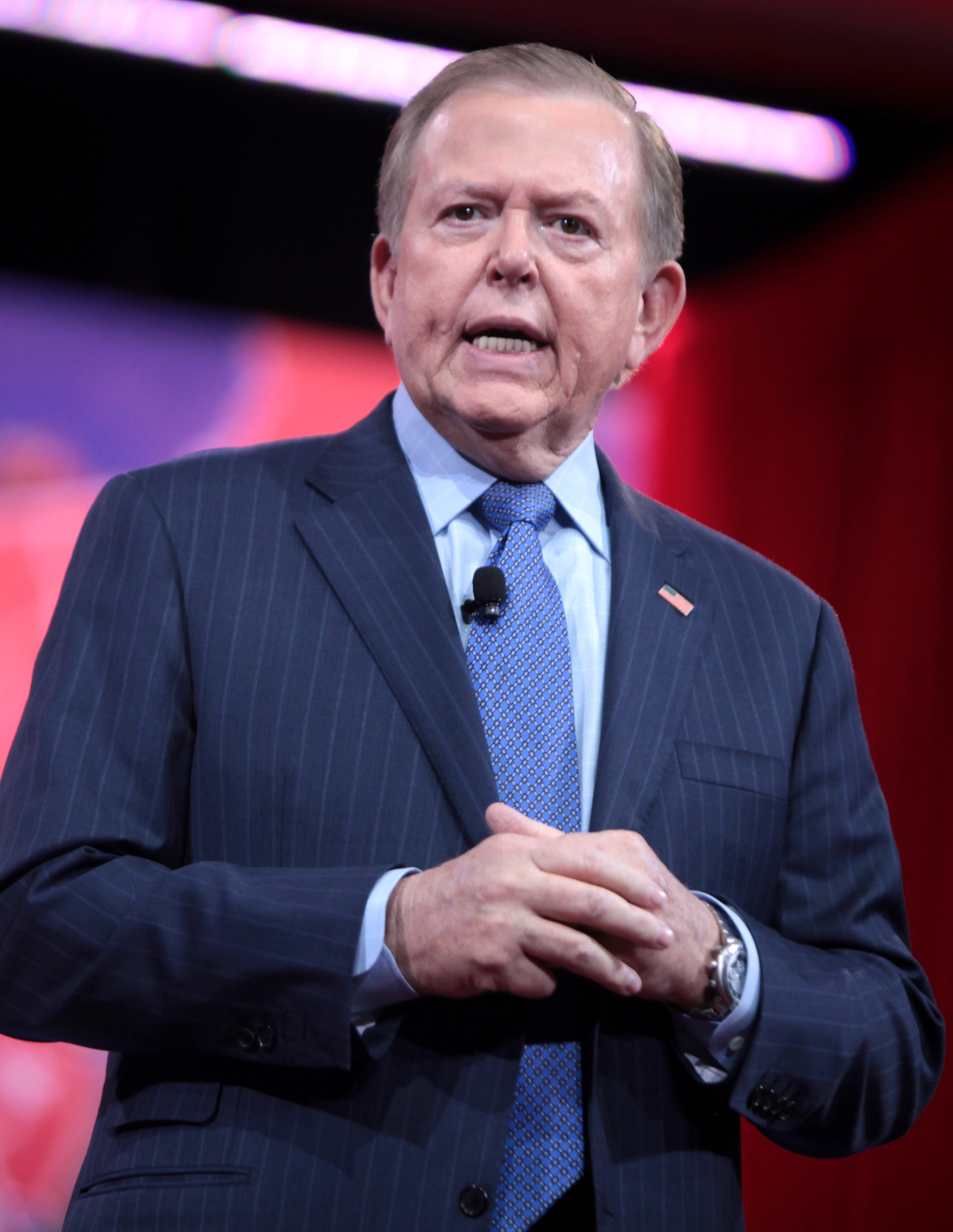
Lou Dobbs

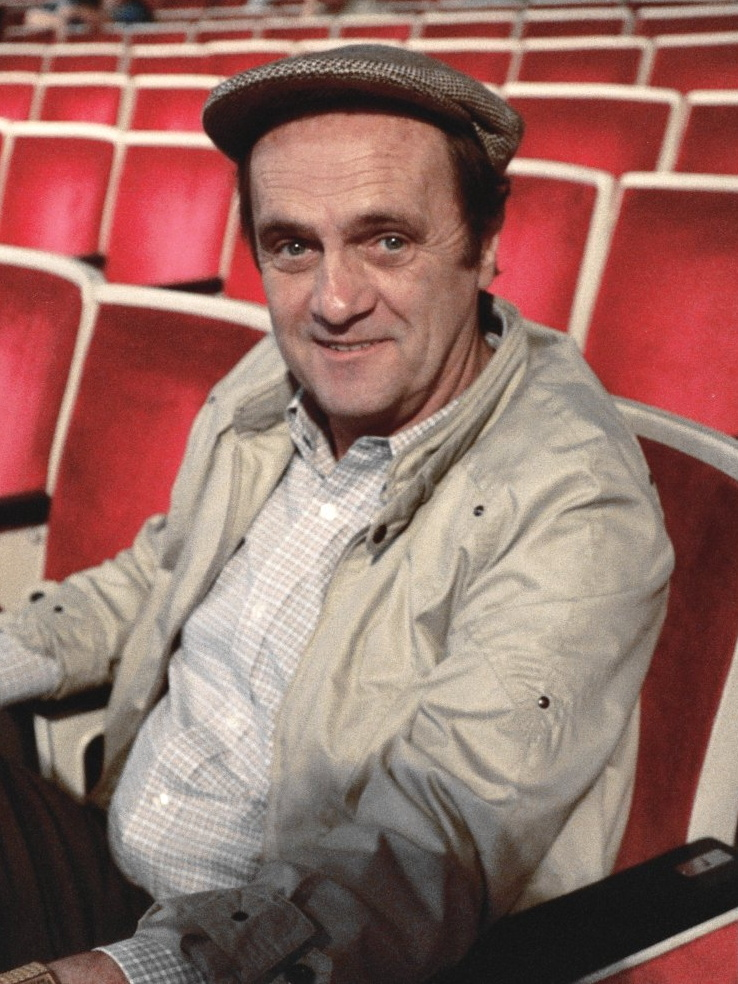
Bob Newhart

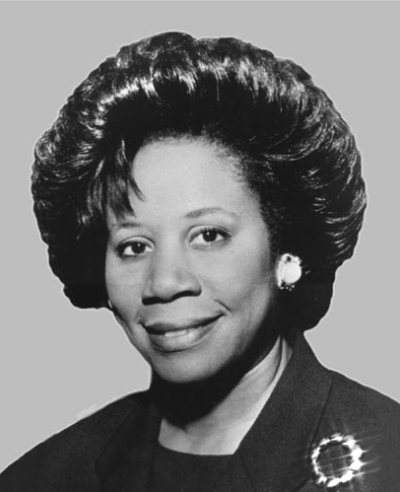
Sheila Jackson Lee

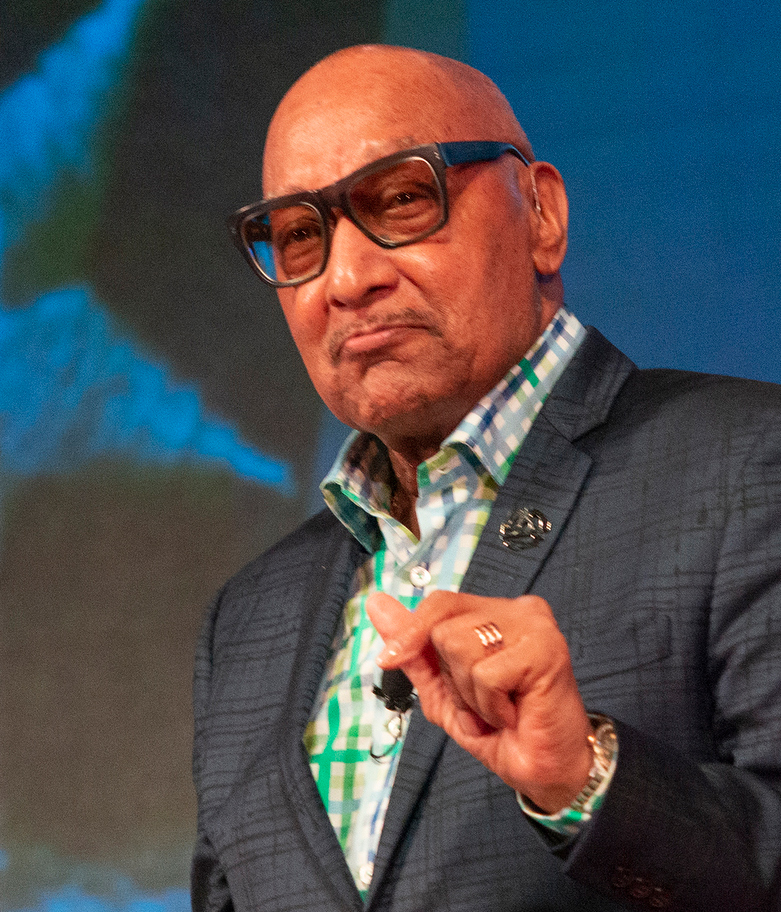
Duke Fakir

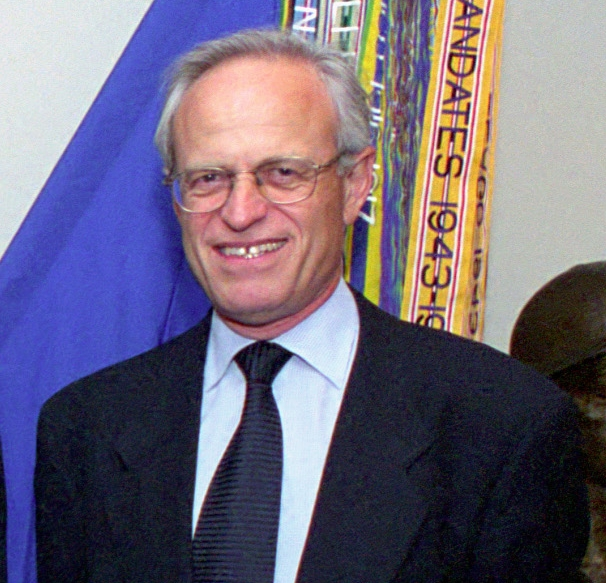
Martin Indyk

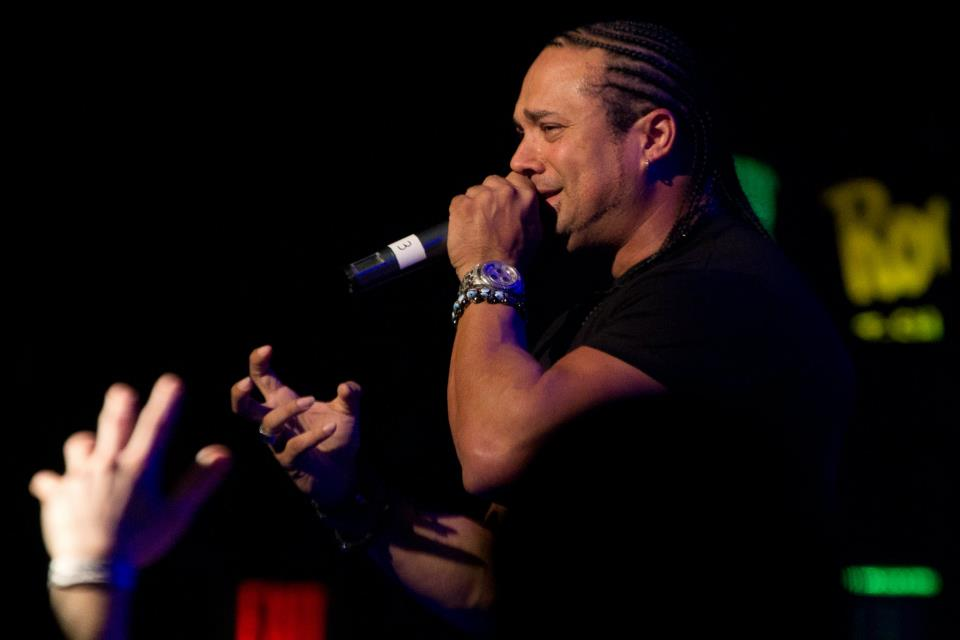
Chino XL

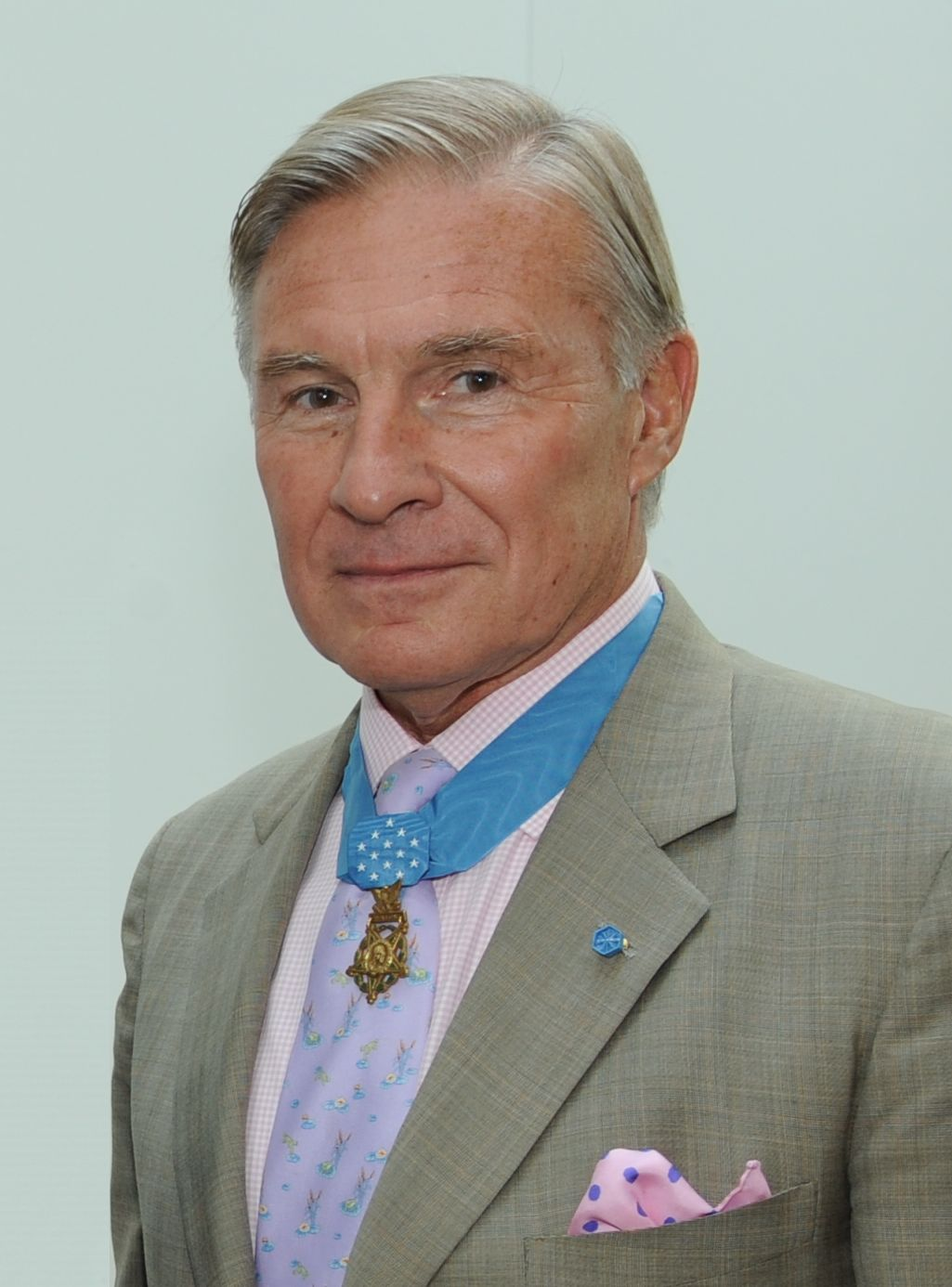
Paul Bucha

- July 1
  - Michael Corcoran, 68, journalist and author (b. 1956)
  - Rusty Golden, 65, singer-songwriter (The Goldens) (b. 1959)
  - Jeffrey Hopkins, 83, Tibetologist (b. 1940)
  - Taras Hunczak, 92, Ukrainian-born historian and political scientist (b. 1932)
  - June Leaf, 94, visual artist (b. 1929)
  - Laurie Lindeen, 62, musician and author (b. 1961/1962)
  - Beth Long, 76, politician, member of the Missouri House of Representatives (b. 1948)
  - Robert Towne, 89, screenwriter (The Last Detail, Chinatown, Shampoo) and Academy winner (1975) (b. 1934)
  - William Rubinstein, 77, historian and author (b. 1946)
  - Martin Stolar, 81, civil rights and criminal defense attorney (b. 1943)
  - Cliff Waldron, 83, bluegrass singer (b. 1941)
- July 2
  - Chung-ying Cheng, 88, Chinese-born philosopher (b. 1935)
  - Tom Fowler, 73, bass guitarist and musician (Frank Zappa, The Mothers of Invention) (b. 1951)
  - Karl Jaffary, 88, American-born Canadian politician, Toronto city councillor (1969–1974) (b. 1936)
  - Ella Mitchell, 88, singer and actress (The Wiz, Big Momma's House) (b. 1935)
- July 3
  - Mark Germino, 73, singer-songwriter (b. 1950)
  - David Liederman, 75, chef and businessman (b. 1949)
  - David Hofmans, 81, Thoroughbred racehorse trainer (b. 1943)
- July 4
  - Wade Bell, 79, Olympic runner (1968) (b. 1945)
  - Dorothy Lichtenstein, 84, philanthropist (b. 1939)
  - Joe Robles, 78, military general, president and CEO of the USAA (2007–2015) (b. 1946)
- July 5
  - Judith Belushi-Pisano, 73, radio and television producer (Biography, The National Lampoon Radio Hour) (b. 1951)
  - Jon Landau, 63, film producer (Titanic, Solaris, Avatar) (b. 1960)
  - Stanley Moss, 99, poet (b. 1925)
  - Vic Seixas, 100, Hall of Fame tennis player (b. 1923)
  - Jim Shaw, 77, politician, mayor of Rapid City, South Dakota (1997–2001, 2003–2007) (b. 1946)
  - Arunas Vasys, 80, Lithuanian-born football player (Philadelphia Eagles) (b. 1943)
- July 6
  - Jimmy Hurst, 52, baseball player (Detroit Tigers) (b. 1972)
  - Khyree Jackson, 24, football player (Minnesota Vikings) (b. 1999)
  - Sonya Massey, 36, unlawful killing victim (b. 1988)
- July 7
  - Bill Klages, 97, lighting designer (b. 1927)
  - Jane McAlevey, 59, labor unionist, author and political commentator (b. 1964)
  - Jim Rotondi, 61, jazz trumpeter (b. 1962)
  - Merrett R. Stierheim, 90, public administrator (b. 1933)
- July 8
  - Shel Bachrach, 80, insurance broker, investor, and philanthropist (b. 1944)
  - Robert Pearson, 87, British-born restaurateur (b. 1936)
  - Andrejs Plakans, 83, Latvian-born historian (b. 1940)
  - Tony Voce, 43, ice hockey player (Philadelphia Phantoms) (b. 1980)
  - Michael Zulli, 71, comic book artist (The Puma Blues, The Sandman, Taboo) (b. 1952)
- July 9
  - Joe Bonsall, 76, singer (The Oak Ridge Boys) (b. 1948)
  - Dan Collins, 80, journalist (CBS News.com) and author (b. 1943)
  - Paul Evanko, law enforcement officer, commissioner of the Pennsylvania State Police (1995–2003)
  - Jim Inhofe, 89, politician, member of the U.S. House of Representatives (1987–1994) and Senate (1994–2023) (b. 1934)
  - David Loughery, 71, screenwriter (Dreamscape, Star Trek V: The Final Frontier, Passenger 57) (b. 1953)
  - Maxine Singer, 93, molecular biologist and science administrator (b. 1931)
  - James R. Tallon, 82, politician, member (1975–1993) and acting speaker (1991) of the New York State Assembly (b. 1941)
- July 10
  - Robert L. Allen, 82, activist, writer (Black Awakening in Capitalist America) and academic (b. 1942)
  - Neil Clabo, 71, football player (Minnesota Vikings) (b. 1952)
  - Ron Clinkscale, 90, Canadian football player (BC Lions, Calgary Stampeders) (b. 1933)
  - Joe Engle, 91, pilot, aeronautical engineer and NASA astronaut (b. 1932)
  - Dave Loggins, 76, singer-songwriter ("Please Come to Boston") (b. 1947)
  - Mary C. Moran, 90, politician, mayor of Bridgeport, Connecticut (1989–1991) (b. 1933)
  - Marc Nerlove, 90, economist (b. 1933)
  - Tommy F. Robinson, 82, politician, member of the U.S. House of Representatives (1985–1991) (b. 1942)
  - Fred Rosner, 88, academic and doctor (b. 1935) (death announced on this date)
- July 11
  - Hope Alswang, 77, museum director (Norton Museum of Art) (b. 1947)
  - Shelley Duvall, 75, actress (McCabe & Mrs. Miller, Annie Hall, The Shining) (b. 1949)
  - Monte Kiffin, 84, football coach (Tampa Bay Buccaneers) (b. 1940)
  - Mark Nakashima, 61, politician, member of the Hawaii House of Representatives (since 2008) (b. 1963)
  - Thomas Neff, 80, physicist (b. 1943)
  - Tim Sneller, 68, politician, member of the Michigan House of Representatives (2017–2022) (b. 1956)
  - Gail Wilensky, 81, health economist (b. 1943)
- July 12
  - Bob Booker, 92, writer and television producer (b. 1931)
  - Kenneth T. Derr, 87, businessman, CEO of Chevron Corporation (1989–1999) (b. 1936)
  - Janice Monk, 87, Australian-born feminist geographer.
  - Bill Viola, 73, contemporary video artist (b. 1951)
  - Ruth Westheimer, 96, German-born sex therapist, talk show host, professor (b. 1928)
  - Evan Wright, 59, writer (Generation Kill) and journalist (b. 1964)
- July 13
  - Tom Azinger, 89, politician, member of the West Virginia House of Delegates (1995–2014) (b. 1935)
  - Thomas Matthew Crooks, 20, gunman (attempted assassination of Donald Trump) (b. 2003)
  - Shannen Doherty, 53, actress (Heathers, Beverly Hills, 90210, Charmed) (b. 1971)
  - P. Buckley Moss, 91, artist and philanthropist (b. 1933)
  - Naomi Pomeroy, 49, chef (b. 1974)
  - James B. Sikking, 90, actor (Charro!, Hill Street Blues, Doogie Howser, M.D.) (b. 1934)
  - Richard Simmons, 76, fitness personality (b. 1948)
  - Chester J. Straub, 87, jurist and politician, judge of the U.S. Court of Appeals for the Second Circuit (since 1998), member of the New York State Assembly (1967–1972) and senate (1973–1975) (b. 1937)
  - Bob Tischler, 78, television writer and producer (Saturday Night Live) (b. 1946)
- July 14
  - Sarah Gibson, 38, pianist and composer (b. 1986)
  - Jacoby Jones, 40, football player (Baltimore Ravens, Houston Texans), Super Bowl champion (2012) (b. 1984)
  - Jerry Walker, 85, baseball player (Baltimore Orioles, Kansas City Athletics, Cleveland Indians) (b. 1939)
- July 15
  - Nelson Chittum, 91, baseball player (Boston Red Sox, St. Louis Cardinals) (b. 1933)
  - Kenneth Heilman, 86, behavioral neurologist (b. 1938)
  - Whitney Rydbeck, 79, actor (Love at First Bite, 1941, Friday the 13th Part VI: Jason Lives) (b. 1945)
  - Nicolas van de Walle, 67, political scientist (b. 1957)
- July 16
  - Joe Bryant, 69, basketball player (Philadelphia 76ers, San Diego Clippers) and coach (Los Angeles Sparks) (b. 1954)
  - J. Michael Cline, 64, businessman, founder of Fandango Media (b. 1959/1960)
  - Peter Courtney, 81, politician, member of the Oregon State Senate (1999–2023) (b. 1943)
  - Tom Fenton, 94, television reporter and correspondent (CBS News) (b. 1930)
  - Melissa Militano, 69, Olympic figure skater (1972) (b. 1955)
  - George Poteet, 75, land speed racer (b. 1948/1949)
  - Bernice Johnson Reagon, 81, song leader, composer, scholar and civil rights activist (b. 1942)
  - Kathy Willens, 74, photographer and photojournalist (b. 1949)
- July 17
  - Jana Bommersbach, 78, journalist (Phoenix New Times, The Arizona Republic) and author (b. 1945)
  - Vincent Burns, 43, football player (Kentucky Wildcats, Indianapolis Colts) (b. 1981)
  - Ken Charlton, 83, basketball player (Colorado Buffaloes) (b. 1941)
  - Martin H. Krieger, 80, urban and regional planner, emeritus professor at the University of Southern California (b. 1944)
  - Mark Kennedy, 72, judge, justice of the Supreme Court of Alabama (1989–1999) (b. 1952)
  - Pinche Peach, 57, death metal vocalist (Brujeria) (b. 1965/1966)
  - Happy Traum, 86, folk singer (b. 1938)
  - Stu Starner, 81, basketball coach (Montana State Bobcats, UTSA Roadrunners) (b. 1943)
  - Pat Williams, 84, basketball executive, co-founder of Orlando Magic (b. 1940)
- July 18
  - Lou Dobbs, 78, political commentator (Lou Dobbs Tonight), television producer (CNNfn) and writer (b. 1945)
  - Jerry Fuller, 85, songwriter ("Travelin' Man", "Young Girl", "Show and Tell") and record producer (b. 1938)
  - Abner Haynes, 86, football player (Kansas City Chiefs, Denver Broncos) (b. 1937)
  - Bob Newhart, 94, actor (The Bob Newhart Show, Newhart, Elf) and comedian, Emmy winner (2013) (b. 1929)
  - Olga Ramos Peña, 98, political organizer and activist (b. 1925)
- July 19
  - Marvin Barkis, 81, politician, member (1979–1993) and speaker (1991–1993) of the Kansas House of Representatives (b. 1943)
  - Sheila Jackson Lee, 74, lawyer, politician, member of the Texas House of Representatives (since 1995) (b. 1950)
  - Jack Morey, 63, amusement park executive (Morey's Piers) (b. 1960/1961)
  - James C. Scott, 87, politologist and author (The Moral Economy of the Peasant, The Art of Not Being Governed, Against the Grain: A Deep History of the Earliest States) (b. 1936)
- July 20
  - Mike Ferraro, 79, baseball player (New York Yankees, Seattle Pilots/Milwaukee Brewers) (b. 1944)
  - Mel Held, 95, baseball player (Baltimore Orioles) (b. 1929)
  - Jerry Miller, 81, guitarist (Moby Grape) (b. 1943)
  - Edward A. Panelli, 92, judge, justice of the Supreme Court of California (1985–1994) (b. 1931)
  - Jim Pitts, 77, politician, member of the Texas House of Representatives (1993–2015) (b. 1947)
  - Sandy Posey, 80, singer ("Single Girl", "I Take It Back") (b. 1940)
  - Jill Schary Robinson, 88, novelist (b. 1936)
- July 21
  - Peter S. Carmichael, 58, historian (b. 1966)
  - Ron Charles, 65, basketball player (Michigan State, Caja de Ronda, Detroit Spirits) (b. 1959)
  - Mark Carnevale, 64, golfer and sportscaster (Sirius XM PGA Tour Radio) (b. 1960)
  - Gus Fleischli, 98, politician, member of the Wyoming House of Representatives (1973–1979) (b. 1925)
  - Randy Kehler, 80, pacifist, tax resister and social justice advocate (b. 1944)
  - Henry J. Nowak, 89, politician, member of the United States House of Representatives (1975–1993) (b. 1935) (death announced on this date)
  - Richie Sandoval, 63, boxer, WBA bantamweight champion (1984–1986) (b. 1960)
  - Walter Shapiro, 77, journalist (The New Republic), columnist and author (b. 1947)
  - Evelyn Thomas, 70, singer ("High Energy") (b. 1933)
- July 22
  - Beauregarde, 88, professional wrestler and musician (b. 1936)
  - Klara Berkovich, 96, Soviet-born violinist and music teacher (b. 1928)
  - Shmuel Butman, 81, rabbi (b. 1943)
  - Mark Carnevale, 64, golfer and sportscaster (Sirius XM PGA Tour Radio) (b. 1960)
  - Duke Fakir, 88, Hall of Fame singer (Four Tops) (b. 1935)
  - Nathan F. Ford, 97, politician, member of the Tennessee House of Representatives (1977–1988) (b. 1927)
  - Sandra B. Rosenthal, 87, philosopher (b. 1936)
- July 23
  - Dick Asher, 92, lawyer and record executive (Columbia Records, PolyGram) (b. 1932)
  - Patrick K. Doughty, 55, sports announcer (Charlotte Hornets) (b. 1969)
  - Lewis H. Lapham, 89, writer (Harper's Magazine), founder of Lapham's Quarterly (b. 1935)
  - Jim Ninowski, 88, football player (Cleveland Browns, Washington Redskins) (b. 1936)
  - Pat Owens, 83, politician, mayor of Grand Forks, North Dakota (1996–2000) (b. 1941)
- July 24
  - John Edwin Davenport, 96, politician, member of the North Carolina House of Representatives (1973–1979) (b. 1928)
  - Denny Lemaster, 85, baseball player (Milwaukee/Atlanta Braves, Houston Astros, Montreal Expos) (b. 1939)
  - Tom Scott, 91, politician, member of the West Virginia State Senate (1994–1998) (b.1932)
- July 25
  - Martin Indyk, 73, diplomat, ambassador to Israel (1995–1997, 2000–2001) (b. 1951)
  - Harold Zvi Schiffrin, 101, American-born Israeli sociologist and intelligence officer (Ritchie Boys) (b. 1922)
  - Doug Smith, 64, football player (Houston Oilers) (b. 1960)
  - Jerry Simmons, 81, football player (Pittsburgh Steelers, Atlanta Falcons, Denver Broncos) (b. 1942)
  - Jim West, 95, sports announcer (Chicago Blackhawks, Chicago Cubs, Baltimore Clippers) (b. 1928/1929)
  - Cynthia Griffin Wolff, 87, literary historian (Emily Dickinson) (b. 1936)
- July 26
  - George B. Crist, 93, Marine Corps general, commander-in-chief of the U.S. Central Command (1985–1988) (b. 1931)
  - Kelly Nelon Clark, 64, Christian and southern gospel vocalist (The Nelons) (b. 1959)
  - Tom C. Korologos, 91, diplomat, ambassador to Belgium (2004–2007) (b. 1933)
  - Charles Royer, 84, politician, mayor of Seattle (1978–1990) (b. 1939)
- July 27
  - Gail Lumet Buckley, 86, journalist and author (b. 1937)
  - Vladimir Petrov, 66, wrestler (b. 1957)
  - DJ Polo, DJ (Juice Crew) and record producer
  - Pete Sanchez, 81, professional wrestler (WWF, Stampede, CSW) (b. 1943)
  - James L. Seward, 72, politician, member of the New York State Senate (1987–2020) (b. 1951)
- July 28
  - Erica Ash, 46, actress (Mad TV, The Big Gay Sketch Show, Survivor's Remorse) (b. 1977)
  - David Earle Bailey, 84, Episcopal priest.
  - David Biale, 75, historian (b. 1949)
  - Chino XL, 50, rapper ("Kreep") and actor (Alex & Emma) (b. 1974)
  - Doug Creek, 55, baseball player (St. Louis Cardinals, San Francisco Giants, Detroit Tigers, Chicago Cubs) (b. 1969)
  - Gene McArtor, 83, baseball coach (Missouri Tigers) (b. 1940/1941)
  - Francine Pascal, 92, author (Sweet Valley High) (b. 1932)
  - Alma Powell, 86, audiologist (b. 1937)
- July 29
  - Pauline Atherton Cochrane, 94, librarian (b. 1929)
  - Robert Banas, 90, dancer and actor (West Side Story, Mary Poppins) (b. 1933)
  - Benjamin Gay, 44, football player (Cleveland Browns) (b. 1980)
  - Floyd Layne, 95, basketball player (Scranton Miners, Hazleton Hawks) and coach (CCNY) (b. 1929)
  - Robert Moreland, 85, college basketball coach (Texas Southern Tigers) (b. 1938)
  - Peter Reddaway, 84, British-born political scientist (b. 1939)
- July 31
  - Waraire Boswell, 48, fashion designer (b. 1975)
  - Paul Bucha, 80, army officer and political advisor, Medal of Honor recipient (b. 1943)
  - Arthur Miles, 74, R&B and jazz musician (b. 1949)

== August ==
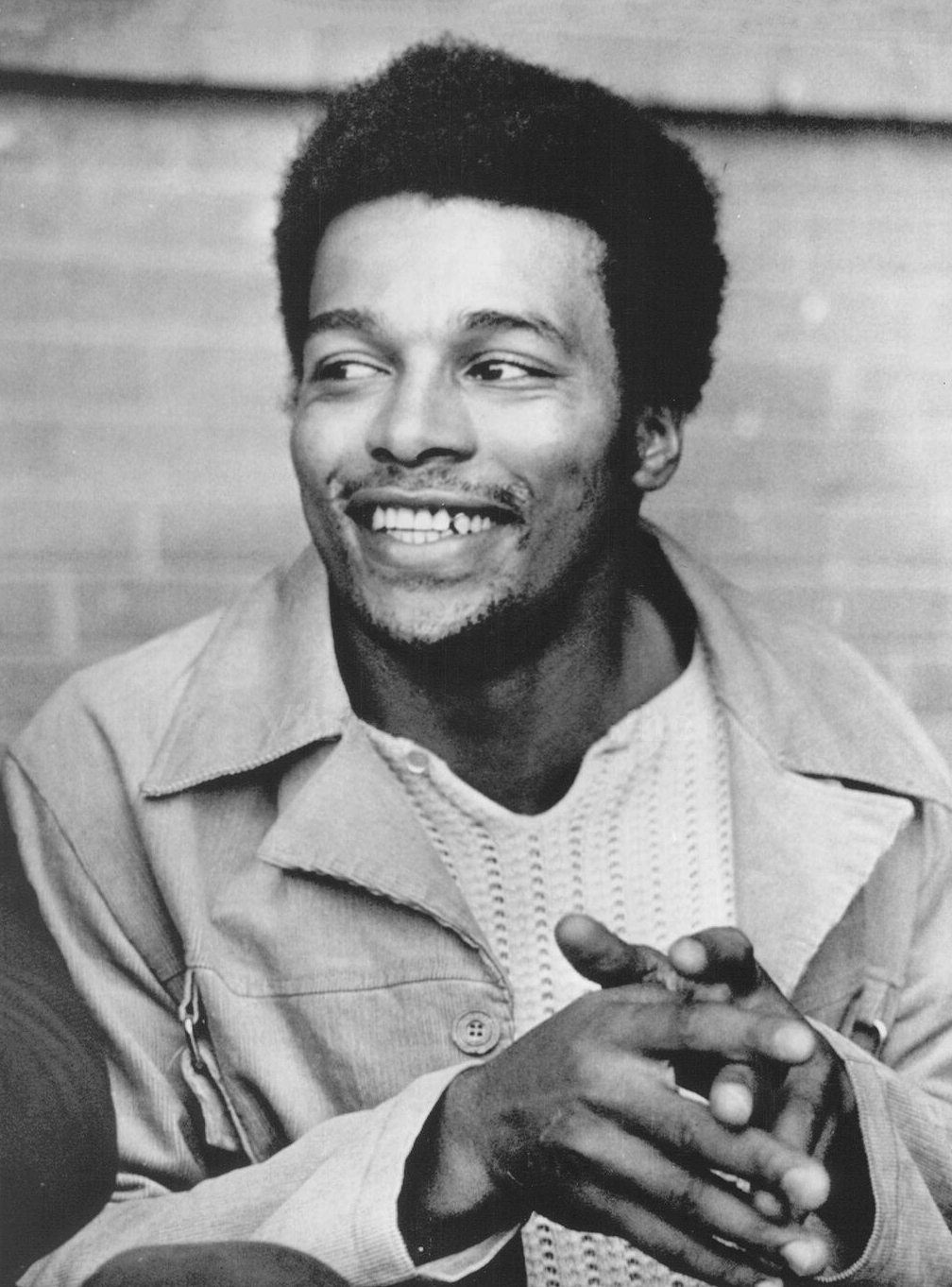
Duane Thomas

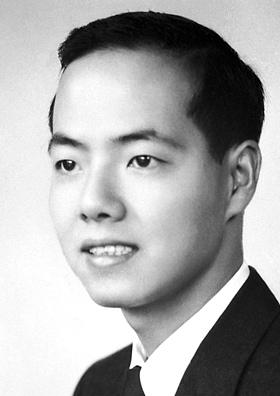
Tsung-Dao Lee

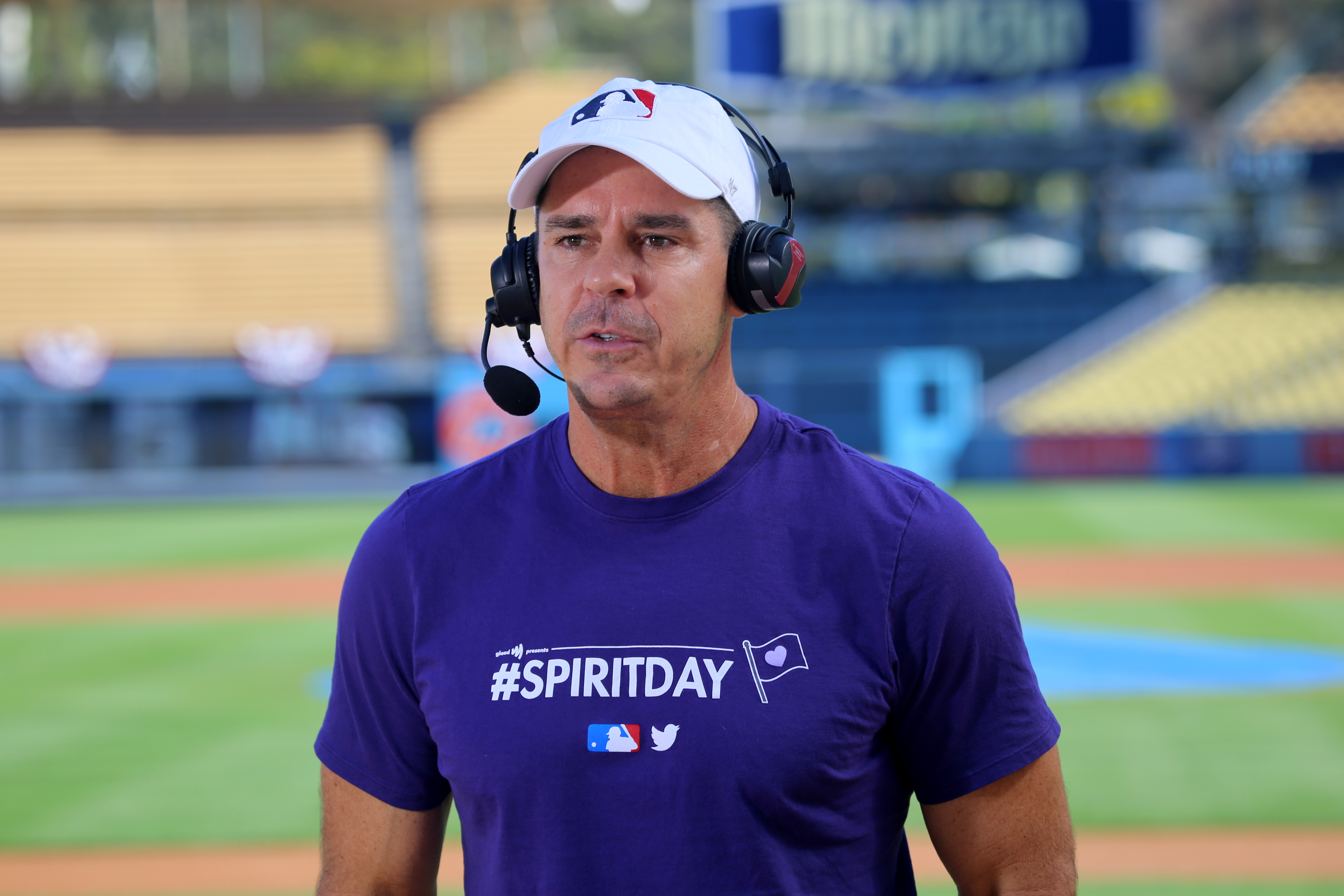
Billy Bean

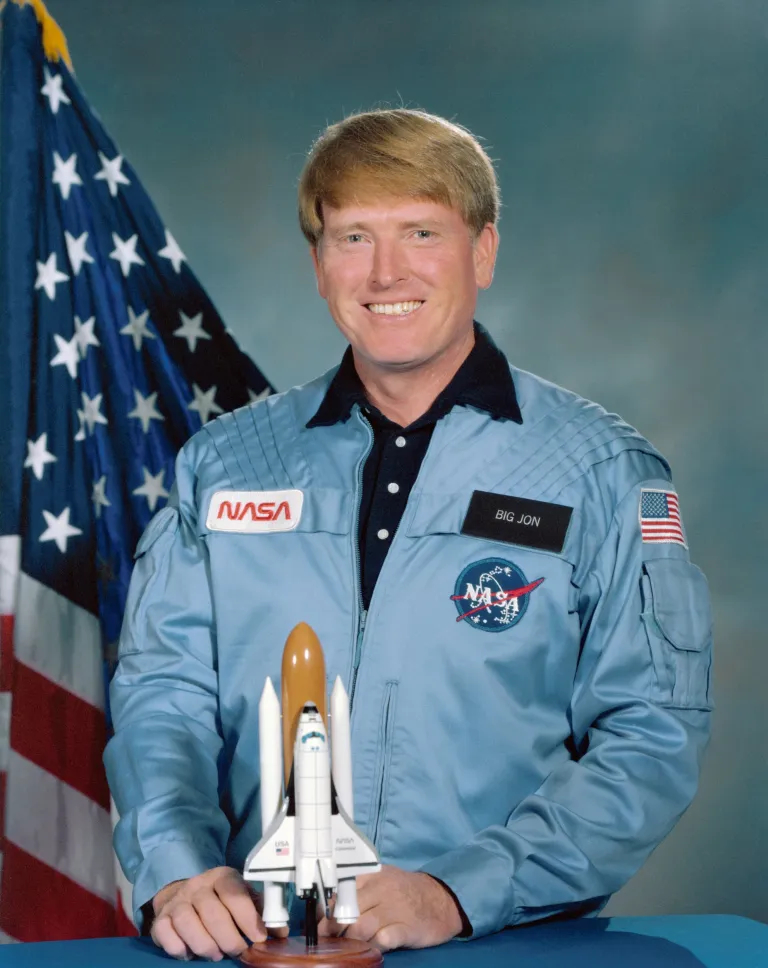
Jon McBride

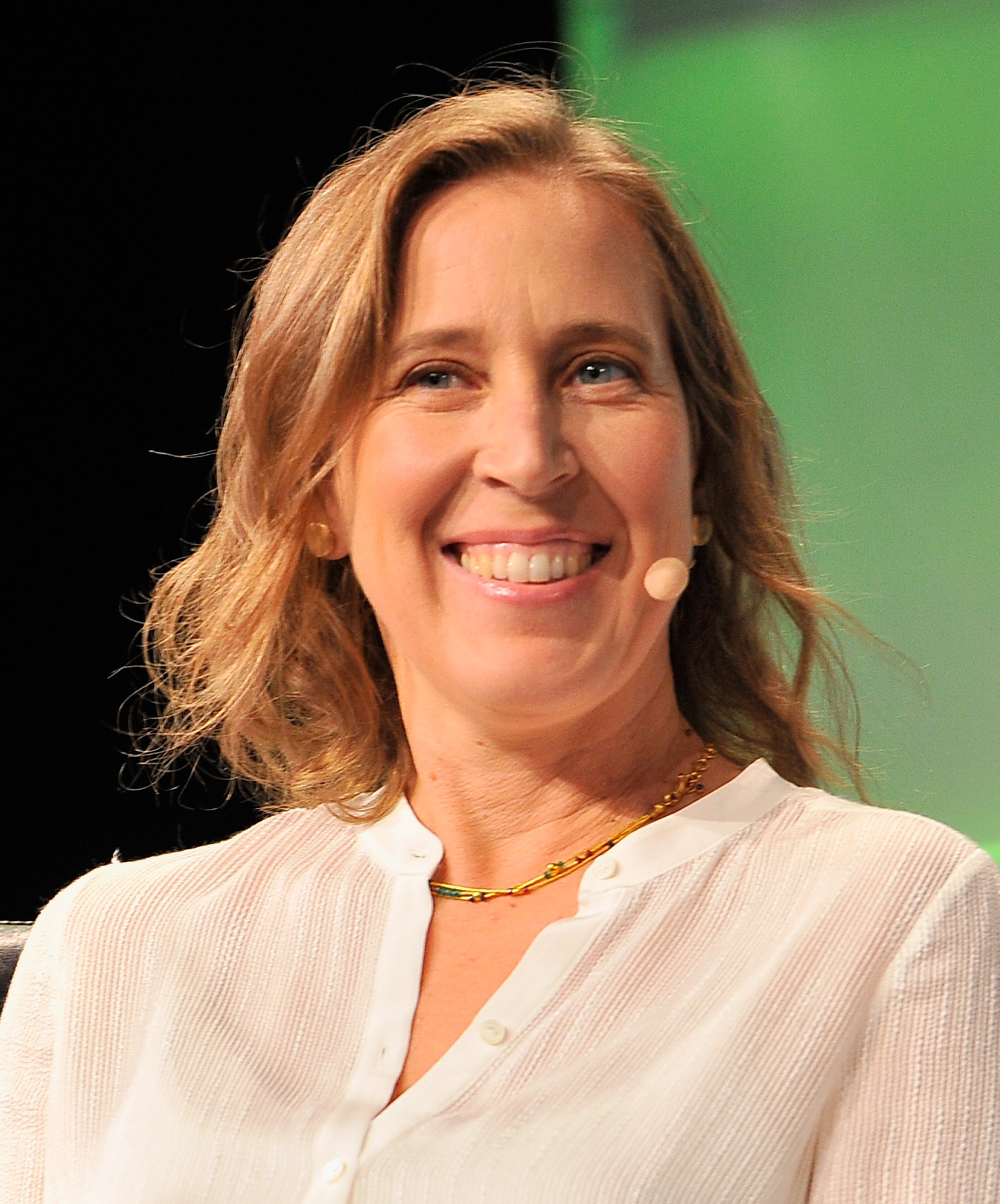
Susan Wojcicki

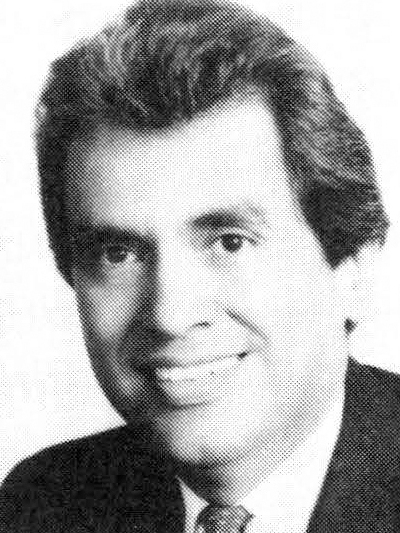
Richard Alatorre

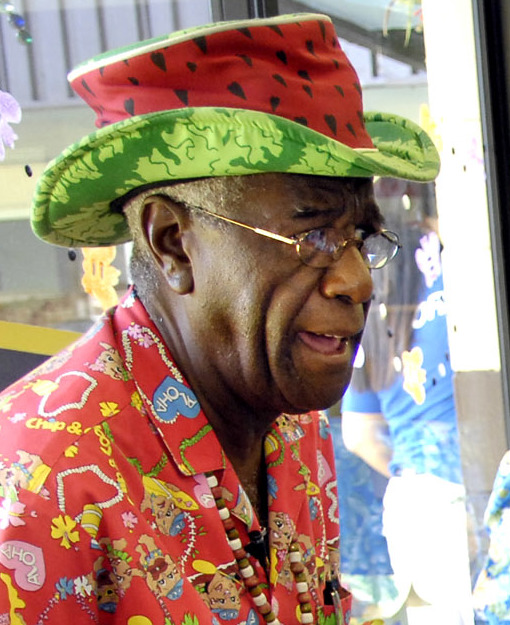
Wally Amos

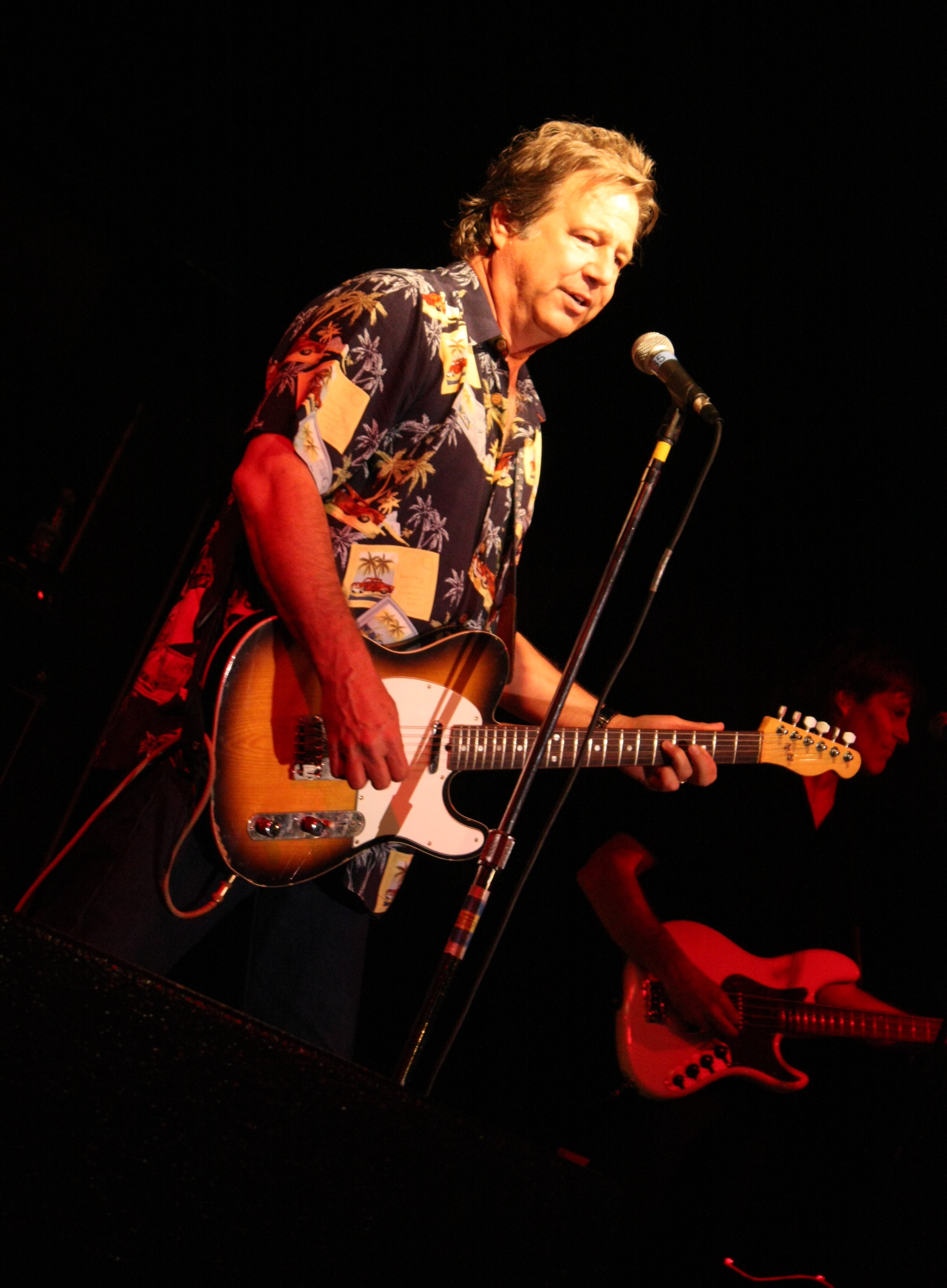
Greg Kihn

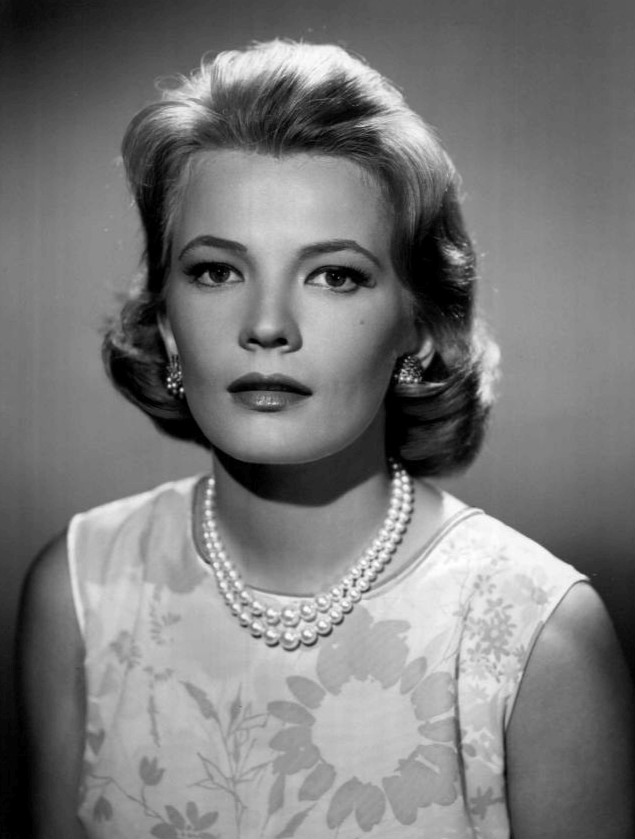
Gena Rowlands

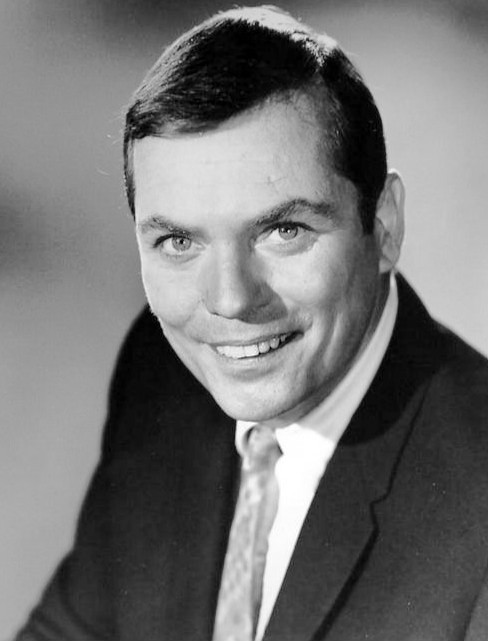
Peter Marshall

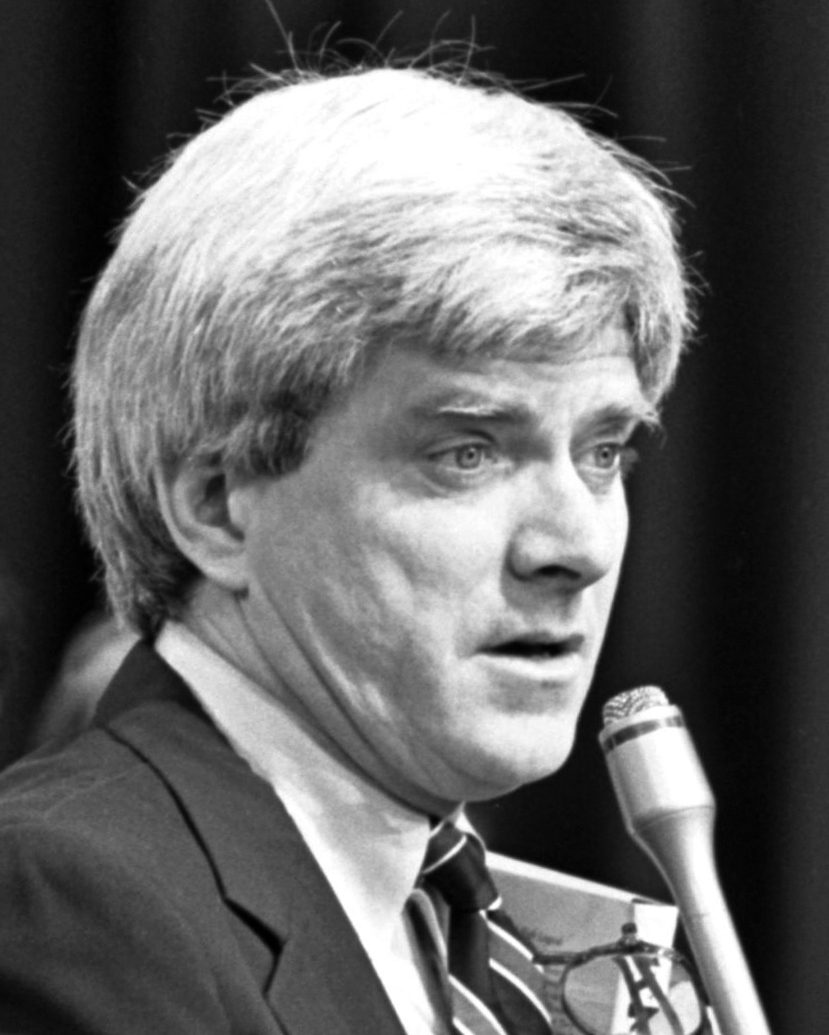
Phil Donahue

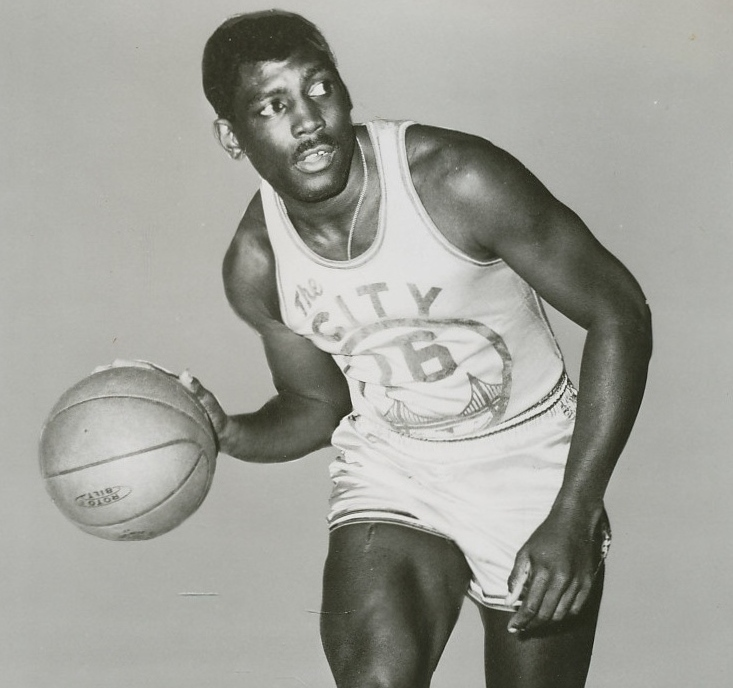
Al Attles

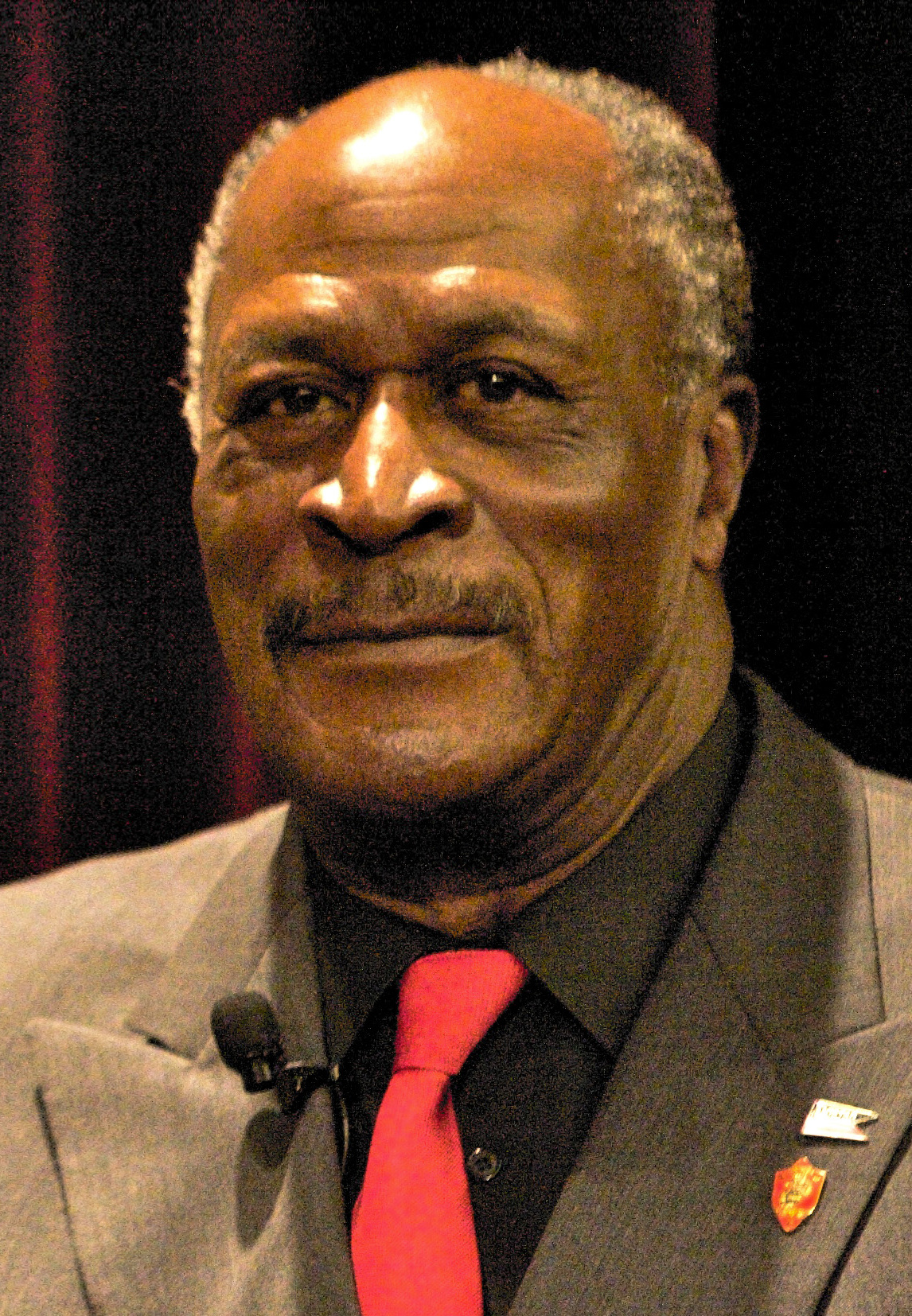
John Amos

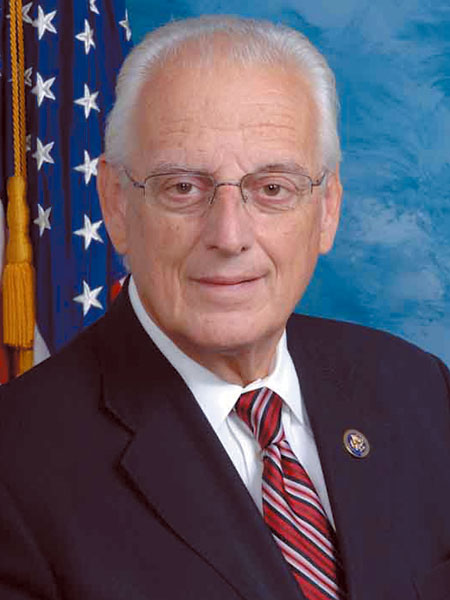
Bill Pascrell

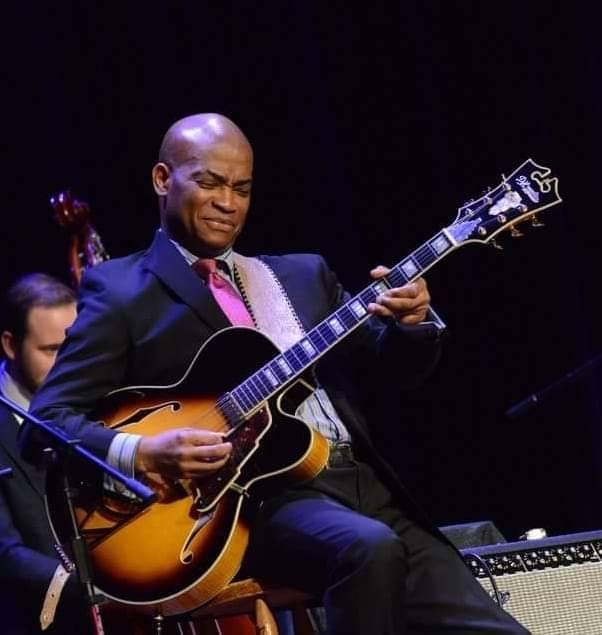
Russell Malone

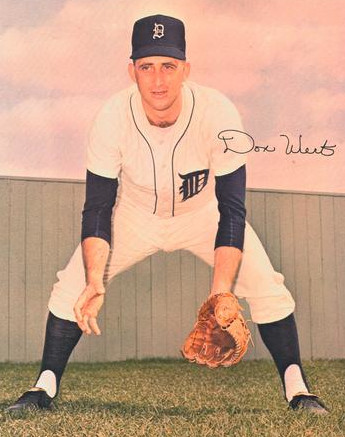
Don Wert

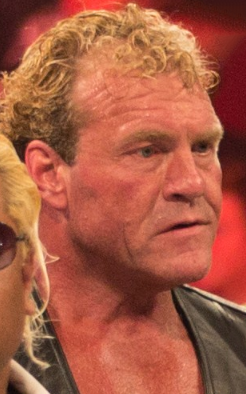
Sid Eudy

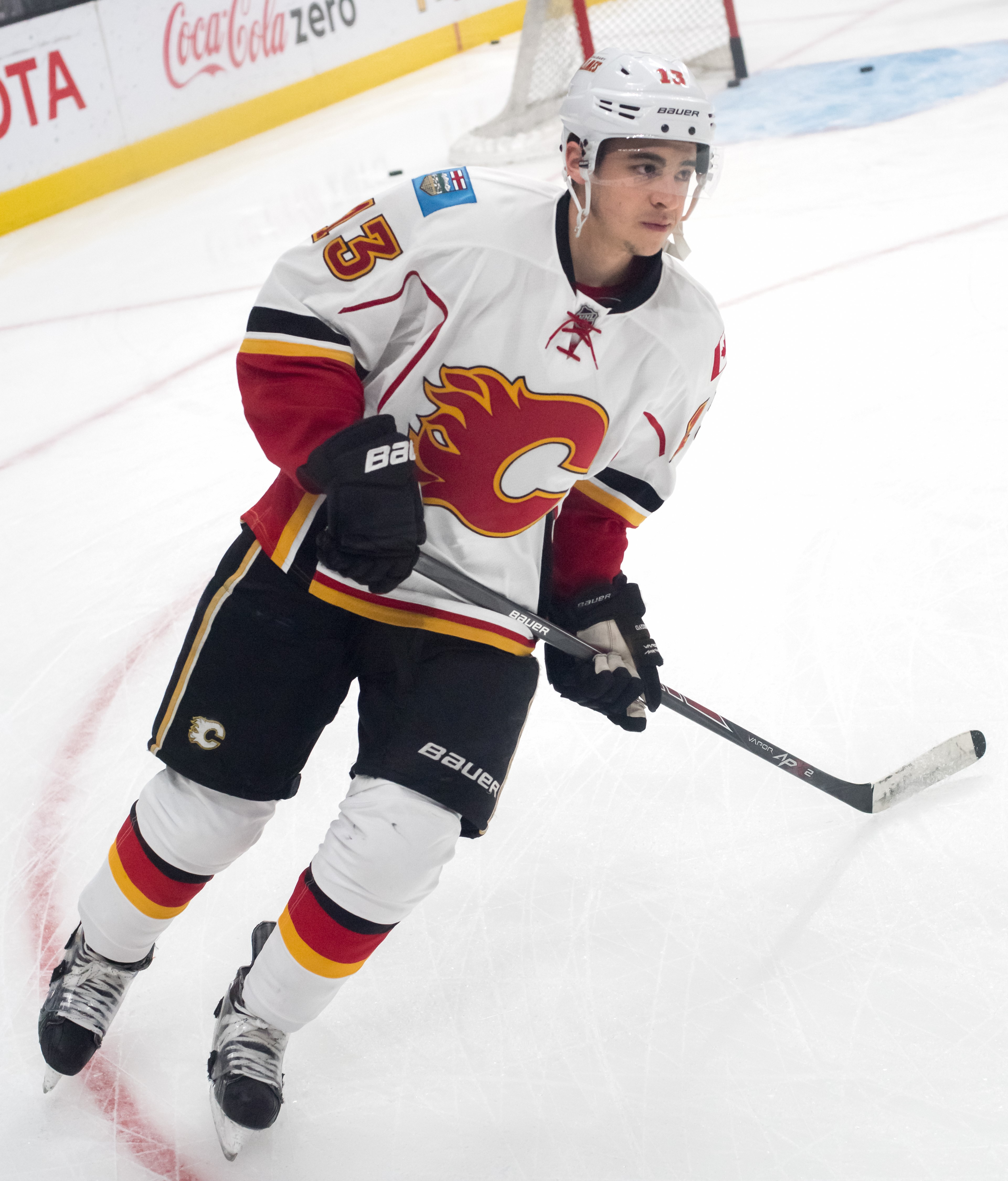
Johnny Gaudreau

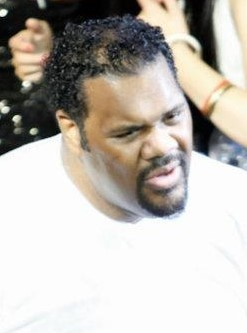
Fatman Scoop

- August 1
  - Joyce Brabner, 72, comic book writer (Brought to Light, Our Cancer Year) (b. 1952)
  - Leonard Engelman, 83, makeup artist (Ghostbusters, Beverly Hills Cop, Rambo: First Blood Part II) (b. 1941)
  - Joe Hand Sr., 87, businessman and media executive (b. 1936)
  - Ina Jaffe, 75, journalist (b. 1948)
  - Leonard Hayflick, 96, anatomist (b. 1928)
  - Daniel Selznick, 88, film and television producer (Blood Feud, The Making of a Legend: Gone with the Wind, Hoover vs. The Kennedys) (b. 1936)
  - Morris Solomon Jr., 80, serial killer (b. 1944)
- August 2
  - James H. Coleman, 91, judge, associate justice of the Supreme Court of New Jersey (1994–2003) (b. 1933)
  - Ross Terrill, 85, Australian-born sinologist (b. 1938)
- August 3
  - Jean Battlo, 85, playwright (Terror of the Tug) (b. 1939)
  - Shaun Martin, 45, musician (Snarky Puppy) and record producer, seven-time Grammy winner (b. 1978)
  - George Schenck, 82, television writer and producer (NCIS) (b. 1942)
- August 4
  - Charles Cyphers, 85, actor (Halloween, Assault on Precinct 13, Major League) (b. 1939)
  - Mark Edward, 73, mentalist and author (Psychic Blues) (b. 1951)
  - Alvin Goldman, 85, philosopher ("A Causal Theory of Knowing") (b. 1938)
  - Steve Kragthorpe, 59, football coach (Tulsa Golden Hurricane, Louisville Cardinals) (b. 1965)
  - Duane Thomas, 77, football player (Dallas Cowboys, Washington Redskins) (b. 1947)
  - Tsung-Dao Lee, 97, Chinese-born physicist, Nobel Prize laureate (1957) (b. 1926)
- August 5
  - John Aprea, 83, actor (The Godfather Part II, The Stepford Wives, The Idolmaker) (b. 1941)
  - Twinkle Borge, activist.
  - Jim Umbarger, 71, baseball player (Texas Rangers, Oakland Athletics) (b. 1953)
  - Maurice Williams, 86, singer (Maurice Williams and the Zodiacs) (b. 1938)
  - Patti Yasutake, 70, actress (Gung Ho, Star Trek: The Next Generation, Drop Dead Gorgeous) (b. 1953)
- August 6
  - Billy Bean, 60, baseball player (Detroit Tigers, Los Angeles Dodgers, San Diego Padres) (b. 1964)
  - James Bjorken, 90, physicist (Bjorken scaling) (b. 1934)
  - Doris Brougham, 98, American-born Taiwanese educator and missionary (b. 1926)
  - Rich Galen, 77, political consultant and commentator (b. 1946) (death announced on this date)
  - Jay Kanter, 97, film producer (Villain, Fear Is the Key) and talent agent (b. 1926)
  - Jim Kearney, 81, football player (Kansas City Chiefs, Detroit Lions, New Orleans Saints) (b. 1943)
  - Sean Piche, 44, Internet entrepreneur (Fur Affinity) (b. 1980)
  - Myron E. Ullman, 77, businessman, CEO of J.C. Penney (2004–2011, 2013–2016) (b. 1946)
  - Marigene Valiquette, 99, politician, member of the Ohio Senate (1969–1986) and House of Representatives (1963–1969) (b. 1924)
- August 7
  - Ron Fragale, 74, politician, member of the West Virginia House of Delegates (1990–1998, 2000–2014) (b. 1950)
  - Roxanne Gilmore, 70, professor, first lady of Virginia (1998–2002) (b. 1954)
  - Jon McBride, 80, astronaut and naval officer (b. 1943)
- August 8
  - Richard Brilliant, 94, art historian (b. 1929)
  - Elizabeth A. R. Brown, 92, medievalist and professor (Brooklyn College) (b. 1932)
  - Kathy Byrne, 66, lawyer (b. 1957)
  - Casey Converse, 66, Olympic swimmer (1976) (b. 1957)
  - Taberon Honie, 48, convicted murderer and rapist (b. 1975)
  - Harvey Marlatt, 75, basketball player (Detroit Pistons) (b. 1948)
  - Mitzi McCall, 93, actress (Ice Age, World's Greatest Dad, Alright Already) and comedian (b. 1930)
  - Nelson Serrano, 85, Ecuadorian-born convicted murderer (b. 1938)
  - Mike Sertich, 77, ice hockey coach (Minnesota Duluth Bulldogs) (b. 1947)
  - Steve Symms, 86, politician, member of the House of Representatives (1973–1981) and Idaho Senate (1981–1993) (b. 1938)
  - Woody Thompson, 71, football player (Atlanta Falcons) (b. 1952)
- August 9
  - Richard Brilliant, 94, art historian.
  - Ellen Corbett, 69, politician, mayor of San Leandro (1994–1998), member of the California State Assembly (1998–2004) and Senate (2006–2014) (b. 1954)
  - Charles R. Cross, 67, music journalist, author and editor (b. 1956/1957)
  - Jim Riswold, 66, advertising creative director (Wieden+Kennedy) (b. 1957)
  - Kevin Sullivan, 74, professional wrestler (WCW, NWA, GCW) (b. 1949) (death announced on this date)
  - Lee Spetner, 97, American-Israeli biophysicist and creationist author (b. 1927)
  - Carl Weathersby, 71, electric blues musician (b. 1953)
  - Susan Wojcicki, 56, business executive, CEO of YouTube (2014–2023) (b. 1968)
- August 10
  - Bobby Bottcher, 85, dirt modified racing driver (b. 1939)
  - Rachael Lillis, 55, voice actress (Pokémon, Hunter × Hunter, Winx Club) (b. 1969)
  - Peggy Moffitt, 86, model and actress (Girls Town, Battle Flame, Blowup) (b. 1937)
  - Tamara Murphy, 63, chef (Terra Plata) (b. 1960/1961)
- August 11
  - Ofra Bikel, 94, Israeli-born documentary filmmaker and television producer (Frontline) (b. 1929)
  - Mike Cubbage, 74, baseball player (Texas Rangers, Minnesota Twins, New York Mets) (b. 1950)
  - Ángel Salazar, 68, Cuban-born actor (Scarface, Punchline, Carlito's Way) and comedian (b. 1956)
  - Chon Travis, musician (Love Equals Death).
- August 12
  - Kim Kahana, 94, stuntman (Cool Hand Luke, Planet of the Apes) and actor (Danger Island) (b. 1929)
  - Meyer Kotkin, 68–69, bridge player (b. 1955)
  - Harold Meltzer, 58, composer (b. 1966)
- August 13
  - Richard Alatorre, 81, politician, member of the California State Assembly (1973–1985) and Los Angeles City Council (1985–1999) (b. 1943) (death announced on this date)
  - Wally Amos, 88, entrepreneur (Famous Amos) and television personality (Learn to Read) (b. 1936)
  - Joseph Andriacchi, 91, convicted criminal (Chicago Outfit) (b. 1932) (death announced on this date)
  - Betty Cooke, 100, jewellery designer (b. 1924)
  - Dan Dorazio, 72, football coach (Calgary Stampeders, BC Lions) (b. 1952)
  - Charis Eng, 62, Singapore-born physician and geneticist (b. 1962)
  - Hettie Jones, 90, poet (b. 1934)
  - Greg Kihn, 75, musician (The Greg Kihn Band) and songwriter ("Jeopardy", "The Breakup Song (They Don't Write 'Em)") (b. 1949)
  - Randy Schobinger, 54, politician, member of the North Dakota Senate (1995–2006) and House of Representatives (since 2016) (b. 1969)
  - Frank Selvy, 91, basketball player (Furman Paladins, Milwaukee/St. Louis Hawks, Minneapolis/Los Angeles Lakers) (b. 1932)
  - Herschell Turner, 86, basketball player (Chicago Majors, Pittsburgh Pipers, Anaheim Amigos) (b. 1938)
  - Fritz Von Goering, 94, professional wrestler (b. 1930)
- August 14
  - Jeremy Gilbert-Rolfe, 79, British-born painter and art critic (b. 1945)
  - Takayuki Kubota, 89, Japanese-born karateka, founder of Gosoku-ryu (b. 1934)
  - John Lansing, 67, journalist, CEO of NPR (2019–2024) (b. 1956/1957)
  - Gary E. Luck, 87, military officer (b. 1937)
  - Tommy Roberts, 96, sportscaster and businessman (b. 1928)
  - Gena Rowlands, 94, actress (A Woman Under the Influence, Gloria, The Notebook), four-time Emmy winner (b. 1930)
  - Winsome Sinclair, 58, casting director (Belly, Cadillac Records, All Eyez on Me) and film producer (b. 1965)
  - Jan Yager, 72, artist (b. 1951)
- August 15
  - Russell Atkins, 98, poet, playwright, and composer (b. 1926)
  - BeatKing, 39, rapper ("Then Leave") (b. 1984)
  - Joe Chambers, 81, singer (The Chambers Brothers) (b. 1943)
  - William T. Doyle, 98, politician, member of the Vermont Senate (1969–2017) (b. 1926)
  - Peter Marshall, 98, game show host (Hollywood Squares), actor (Annie, Ensign Pulver) and singer (b. 1926)
  - Karen Mayne, 78, politician, member of the Utah Senate (2008–2023) (b. 1945/1946)
  - Jack Russell, 63, singer and songwriter (Great White) (b. 1960)
- August 16
  - Afa Anoaʻi, 81, Samoan-born Hall of Fame professional wrestler (WWF, Stampede Wrestling, GCW) (b. 1942)
  - Scott Bloomquist, 60, late model racing driver (b. 1963)
  - Tom Brown Jr., 74, naturalist, tracker, survivalist and author (b. 1950)
  - Bobby Hicks, 91, Hall of Fame bluegrass fiddler (b. 1933)
  - Luther Kent, 76, blues singer (b. 1948)
  - John Lee, 71, football player (San Diego Chargers, New England Patriots) (b. 1953)
  - James McIntire, 71, politician, member of the Washington House of Representatives (1998–2009) and Washington state treasurer (2009–2017) (b. 1953)
  - Michael Sperberg-McQueen, 70, philologist and markup language specialist (b. 1954)
  - Autry Stephens, 86, oil industry executive, founder of Endeavor Energy Resources (b. 1938) (death announced on this date)
  - Scott Thorson, 65, gigolo and writer (Behind the Candelabra: My Life with Liberace) (b. 1959)
- August 17
  - Virginia Ogilvy, Countess of Airlie, 91, aristocrat, Lady of the Bedchamber (1973–2022) (b. 1933)
  - Helen Fisher, 79, anthropologist and researcher (b. 1945)
  - Landon Jones, 80, editor (People) and author (b. 1940)
  - Johnny "Dandy" Rodríguez, 78, bongo player (Tito Puente, Tito Rodríguez, Ray Barretto) (b. 1945)
  - Bert Susanka, 62, musician (The Ziggens) (b. 1961/1962)
- August 18
  - Jim Brady, 88, baseball player (Detroit Tigers) and academic, president of Jacksonville University (1989–1996) (b. 1936)
  - Ruth Johnson Colvin, 107, philanthropist, founder of ProLiteracy (b. 1916)
  - Phil Donahue, 88, talk show host (The Phil Donahue Show), media personality, film producer and writer (b. 1935)
  - George Latimer, 89, politician, mayor of Saint Paul, Minnesota (1976–1990) (b. 1935)
- August 19
  - Maria Branyas, 117, American-born Spanish supercentenarian (b. 1907)
  - Richard Pettibone, 86, artist (b. 1938)
  - Dink Widenhouse, 92, racecar driver (b. 1932)
- August 20
  - Al Attles, 87, basketball player and coach (Golden State Warriors) (b. 1936)
  - Erik Barrett, 48, bassist (100 Demons) (b. 1976) (death announced on this date)
  - Alice Green, activist and prison reform advocate (death announced on this date)
  - James Soletski, 75, politician, member of the Wisconsin State Assembly (2007–2011) (b. 1948)
- August 21
  - Thelma Davidson Adair, 103, educator and Presbyterian church leader, moderator of the General Assembly of the United Presbyterian Church in the United States of America (1976) (b. 1920)
  - John Amos, 84, actor (Good Times, The West Wing, Coming to America) (b. 1939)
  - Don Aslett, 89, businessman and author (b. 1935)
  - Roger Cook, 70, landscaper and television personality (This Old House) (b. 1954)
  - James Duderstadt, 81, nuclear engineer and university administrator, president of the University of Michigan (1988–1996) (b. 1942)
  - Nick Mileti, 93, sport team owner (Cleveland Indians, Cleveland Cavaliers, Cleveland Barons) (b. 1931)
  - Ken Miller, 82, football coach (Saskatchewan Roughriders) (b. 1941)
  - Bill Pascrell, 87, politician, member of the U.S. House of Representatives (since 1997) and mayor of Paterson, New Jersey (1990–1997) (b. 1937)
  - Gary Rulon, 83, jurist, judge of the Kansas Court of Appeals (b. 1941)
- August 22
  - Justin Chearno, 54, musician (Pitchblende, Turing Machine) and restaurateur (The Four Horsemen) (b. 1969/1970)
  - Pete Daley, 94, baseball player (Boston Red Sox, Kansas City Athletics, Washington Senators) (b. 1930)
  - Arthur J. Gregg, 96, army general, namesake of Fort Gregg-Adams (b. 1928)
  - Mark Gwyn, 61, law enforcement officer, director of the Tennessee Bureau of Investigation (2004–2018) (b. 1963) (death announced on this date)
  - Marvin Robinson, 67, politician, member of the Kansas House of Representatives (since 2023) (b. 1956/1957)
- August 23
  - Daron Beck, 48, musician (Pinkish Black) (b. 1975/1976) (death announced on this date)
  - Russell Malone, 60, jazz guitarist (b. 1963)
  - Mike Stensrud, 68, football player (Iowa State University, Houston Oilers, Kansas City Chiefs) (b. 1956)
  - Shlomo Sternberg, 87, mathematician and academic (b. 1936)
- August 24
  - Kathie Conway, 69, politician, member of the Missouri House of Representatives (2011–2019) (b. 1955)
  - Betty Halbreich, 96, personal shopper (Bergdorf Goodman), stylist and author (b. 1927)
  - Bobby Rascoe, 84, basketball player (Western Kentucky Hilltoppers, Phillips 66ers, Kentucky Colonels) (b. 1940)
  - Alex Xydias, 102, hot rod car racer (b. 1922)
- August 25
  - Joe D'Alessandris, 70, football coach (Buffalo Bills, San Diego Chargers, Baltimore Ravens) (b. 1954)
  - Don Wert, 86, baseball player (Detroit Tigers, Washington Senators), 1968 World Series champion (b. 1938)
- August 26
  - Gholam Reza Afkhami, 87, Iranian-born scholar and author (b. 1936)
  - Danelle Barrett, 57, rear admiral (b. 1967)
  - Frank Coppa, 82, gangster (Bonanno crime family) (b. 1941)
  - Sid Eudy, 63, professional wrestler (WWF, WCW) (b. 1960)
  - Benji Radach, 45, mixed martial artist (UFC, Strikeforce) (b. 1979) (death announced on this date)
- August 27
  - Bob Carr, 81, politician, member of the U.S. House of Representatives (1975–1981, 1983–1995) (b. 1943)
  - Ron Hale, 78, actor (General Hospital, All the President's Men, Ryan's Hope) (b. 1946)
  - Jim Houghton, 75, actor (Knots Landing) and writer (Young and the Restless) (b. 1948)
  - Leonard Riggio, 83, businessman, chairman of Barnes & Noble (1971–2019) (b. 1941)
  - Rusty Shoop, 76, meteorologist (KERO-TV) (b. 1947/1948)
  - Pete Wade, 89, guitarist (b. 1934)
- August 28
  - Jack Conaty, 77, broadcast journalist and political reporter (WFLD-TV) (b. 1946)
  - Tom Donchez, 72, football player (Chicago Bears) (b. 1952)
  - K. C. Fox, 70, set decorator (Speed, The Girl with the Dragon Tattoo) (b. 1954)
  - Stephen Freese, 64, politician, member of the Wisconsin State Assembly (1991–2007) (b. 1960)
  - Andrew C. Greenberg, 67, video game developer (Wizardry) (b. 1957)
  - Michael Lerner, 81, political activist and magazine editor (Tikkun) (b. 1943)
  - K. C. Potter, 85, academic administrator (Vanderbilt University) (b. 1939)
  - Steve Silberman, 66, writer (NeuroTribes) and editor (Wired) (b. 1957)
- August 29
  - Johnny Gaudreau, 31, ice hockey player (Calgary Flames, Columbus Blue Jackets) (b. 1993)
  - Matthew Gaudreau, 29, ice hockey player (Boston College Eagles, Bridgeport Islanders, Stockton Heat) (b. 1995)
  - Brent Hassert, 71, politician, member of the Illinois House of Representatives (1993–2009) (b. 1952)
- August 30
  - George Berci, 103, Hungarian-born surgeon (Cedars-Sinai Medical Center) (b. 1921)
  - Fatman Scoop, 53, rapper ("Be Faithful", "Lose Control", "It's Like That") (b. 1971)
  - Robert Otto Pohl, 94, German-born physicist (b. 1929)
- August 31
  - Hersh Goldberg-Polin, 23, Israeli-born Hamas hostage (b. 2000/2001) (body discovered on this date)
  - Sonny King, 79, professional wrestler (WWWF) (b. 1945)
  - Obi Ndefo, 51, actor (Dawson's Creek, The West Wing, Stargate SG-1) and yoga teacher (b. 1972)
  - Noel Parmentel, 98, essayist (b. 1926)

== September ==
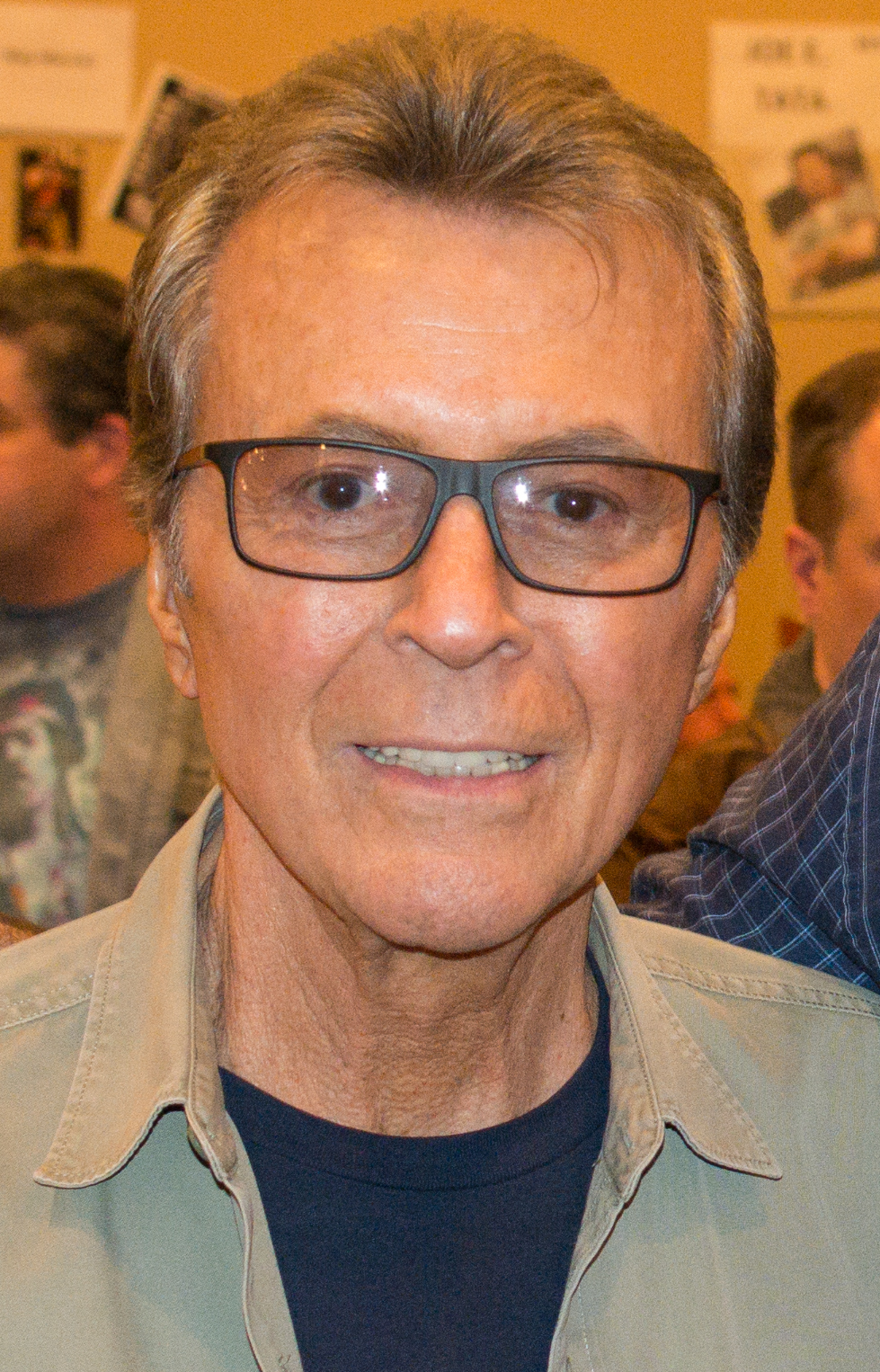
James Darren

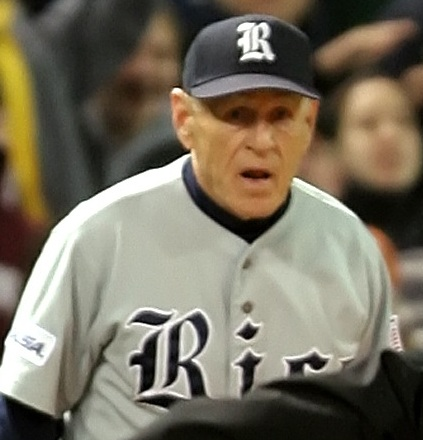
Wayne Graham

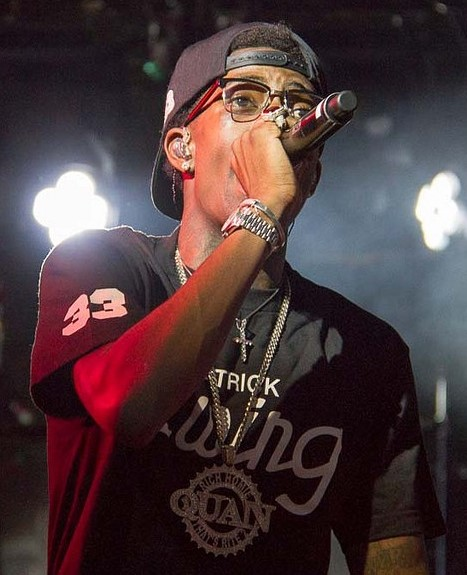
Rich Homie Quan

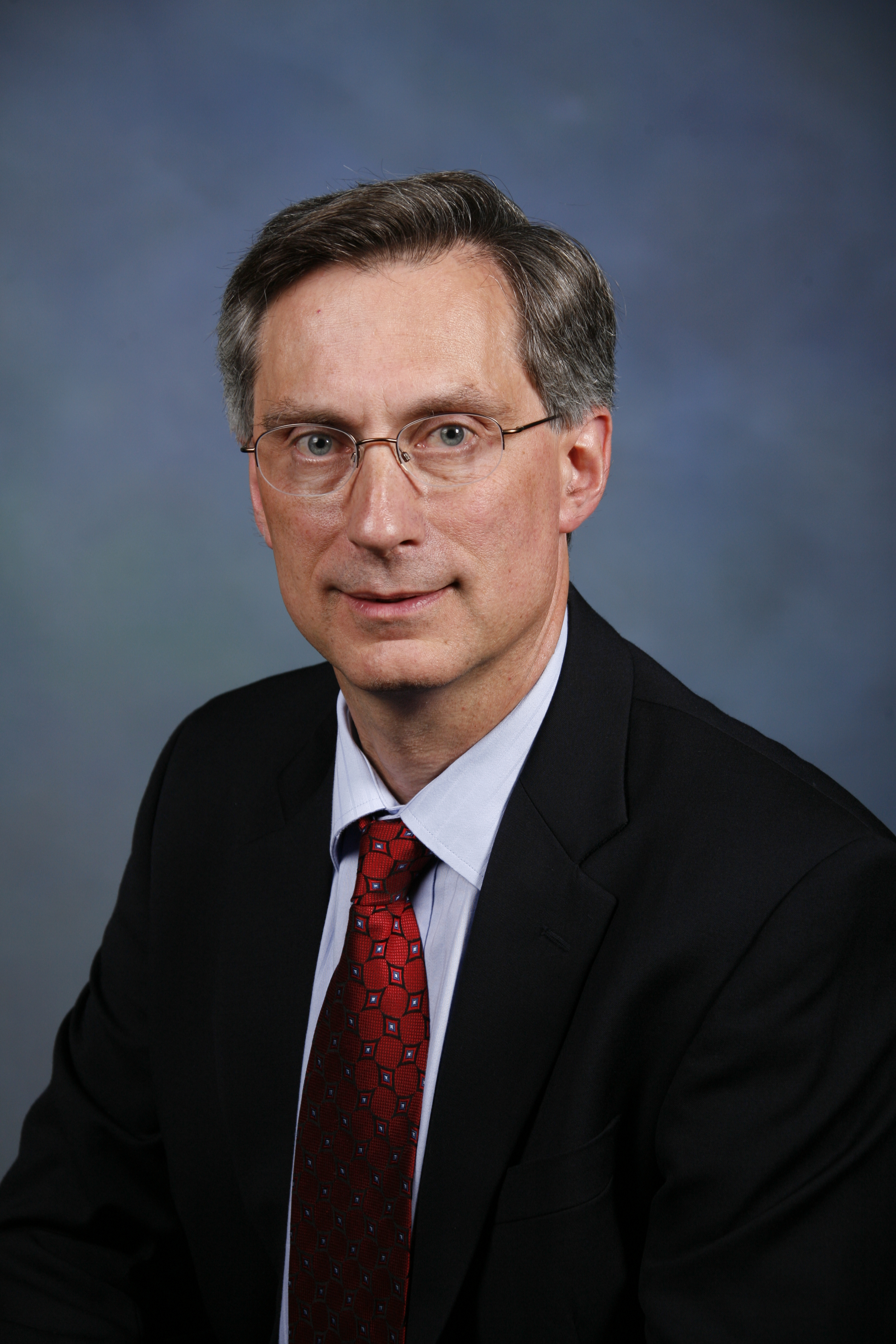
Charles F. McMillan

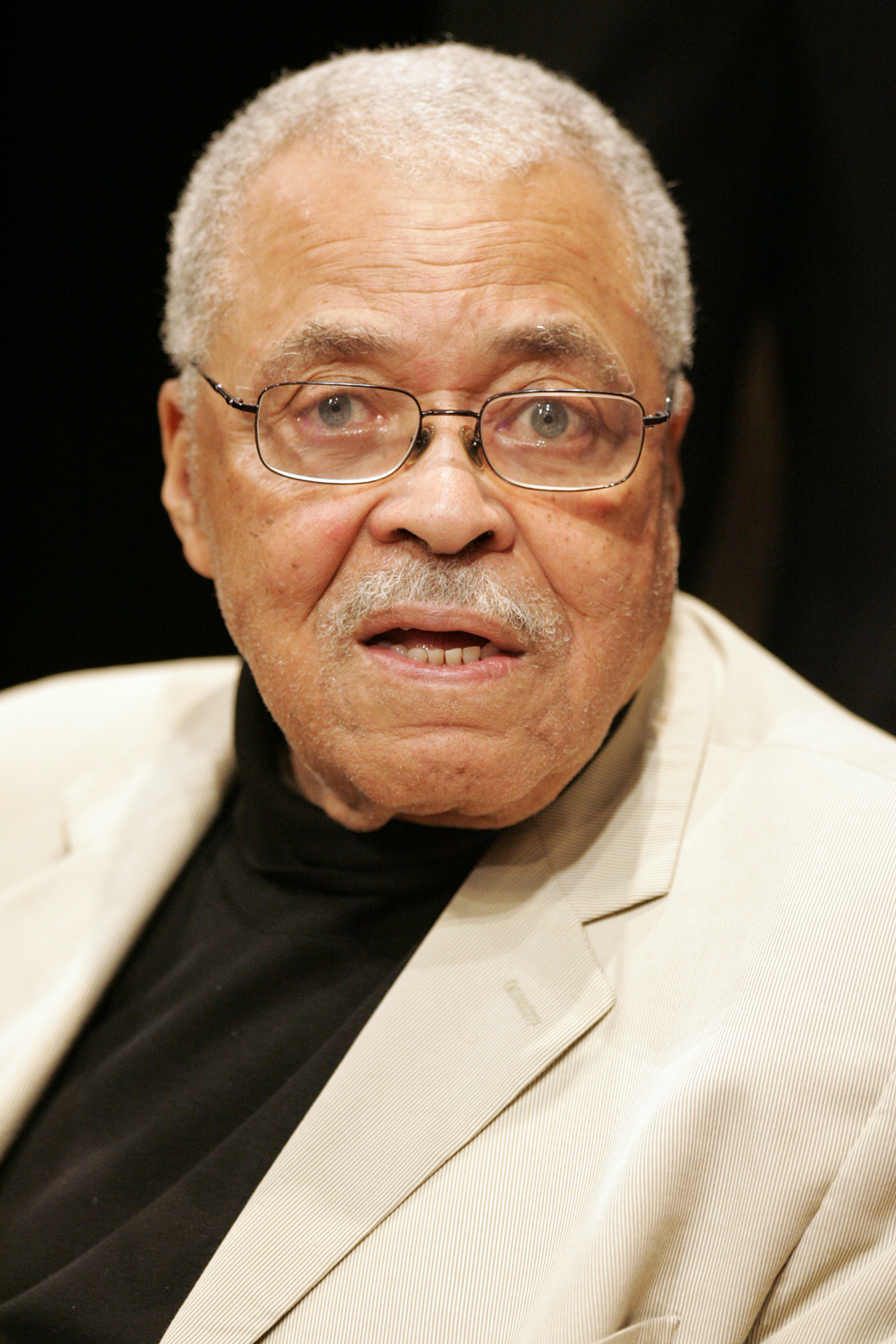
James Earl Jones

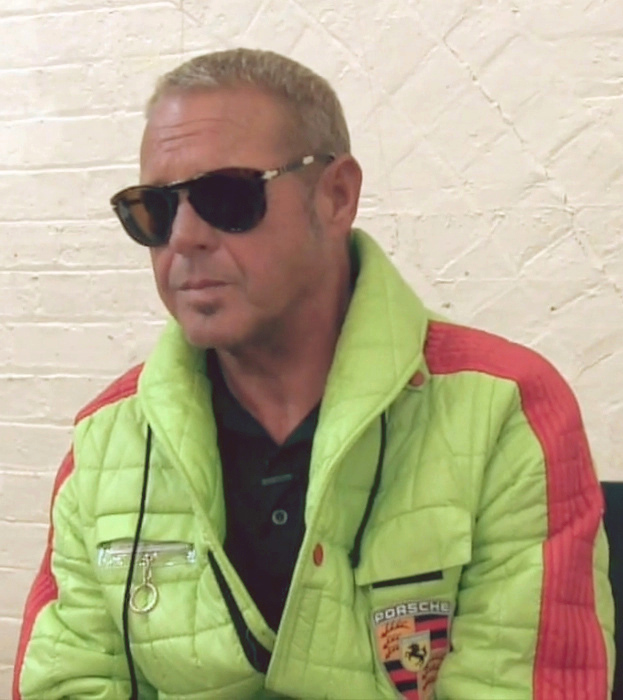
Chad McQueen

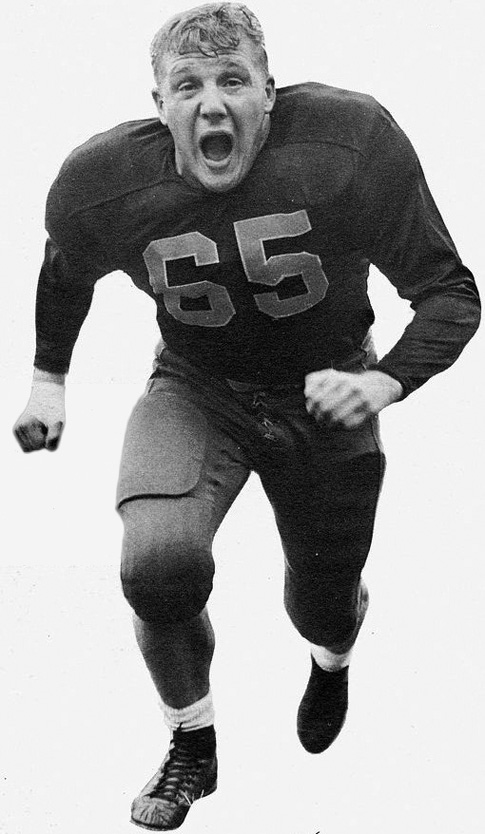
Joe Schmidt

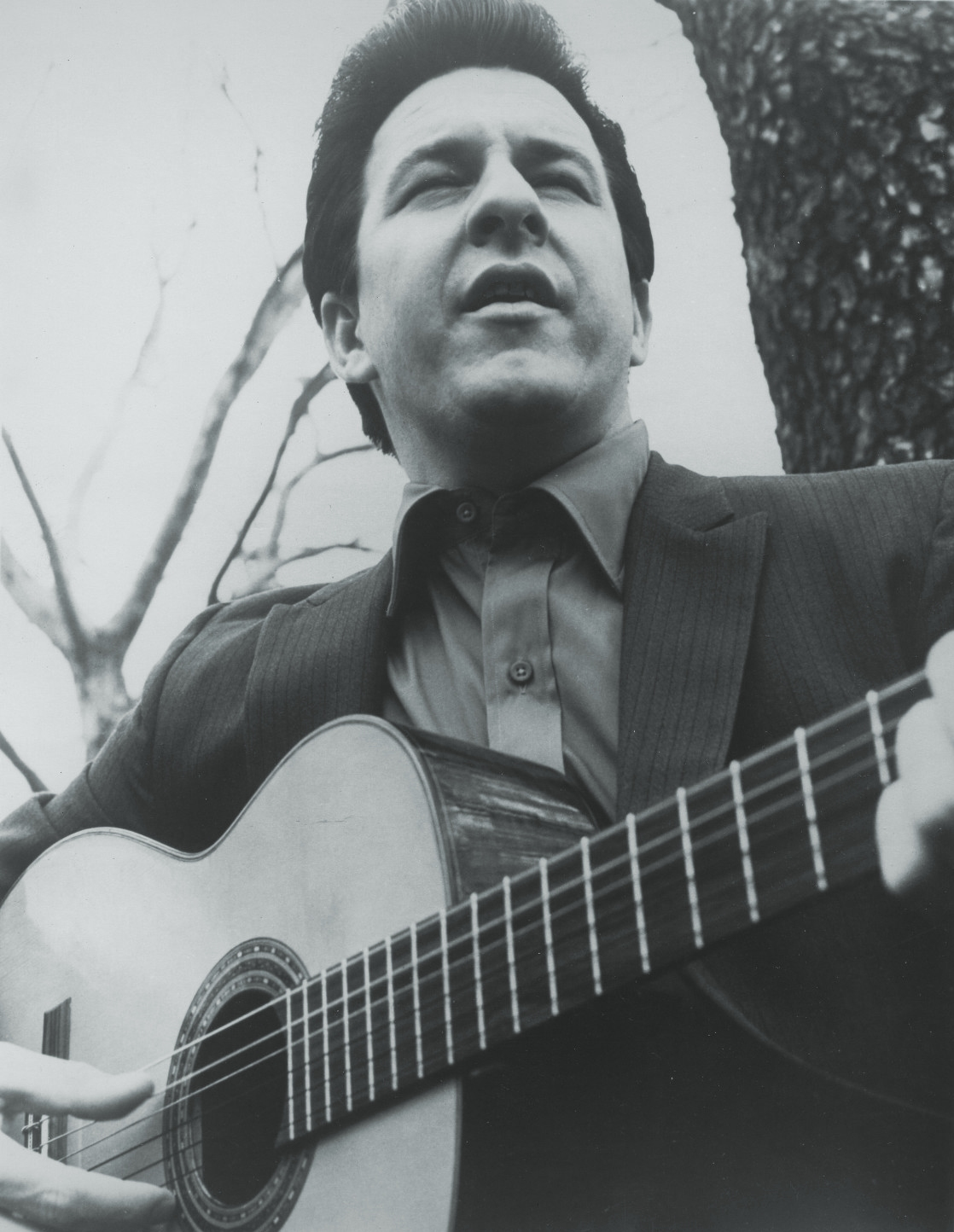
Tommy Cash

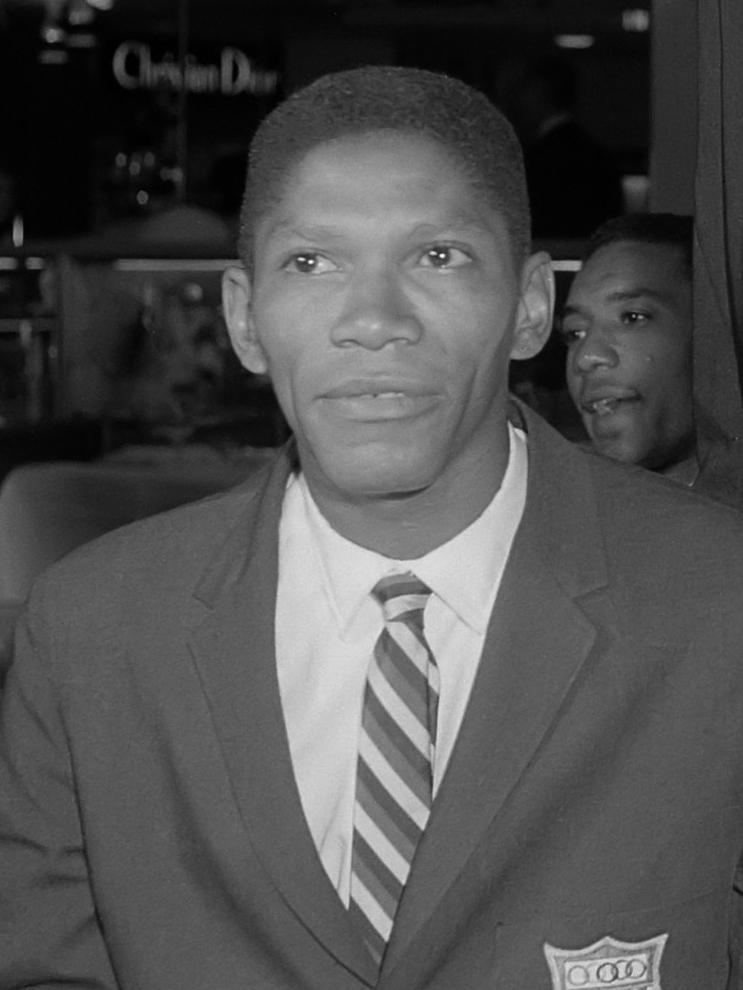
Otis Davis

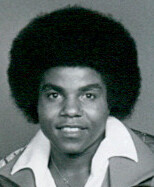
Tito Jackson

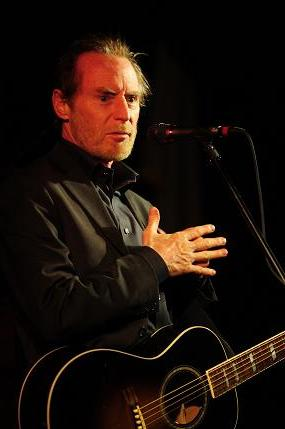
JD Souther

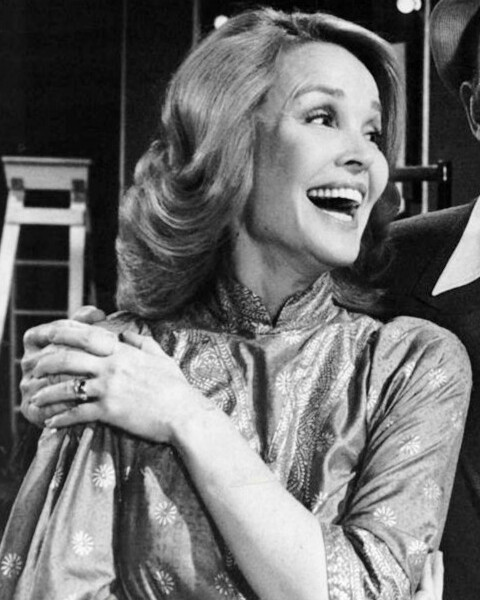
Kathryn Crosby

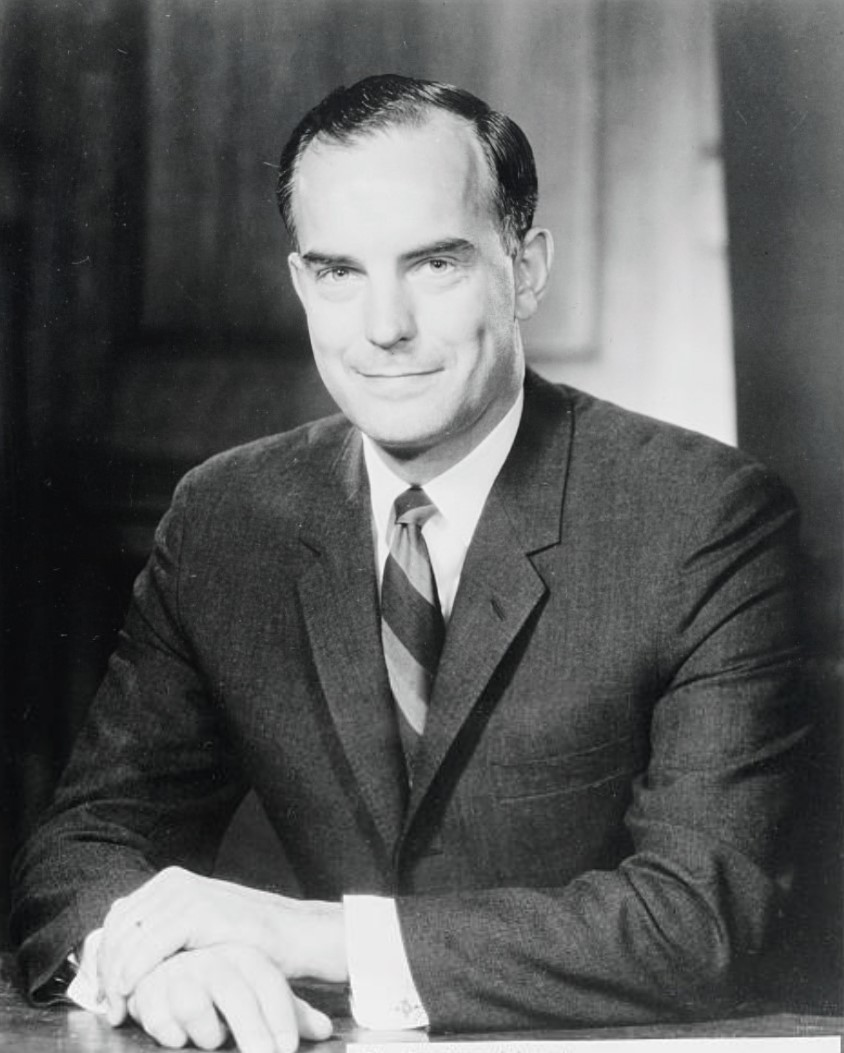
Daniel J. Evans

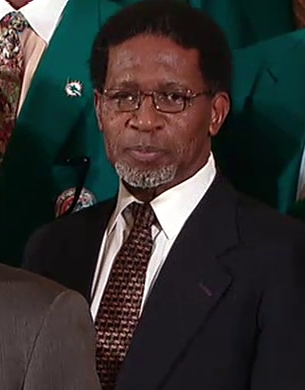
Mercury Morris

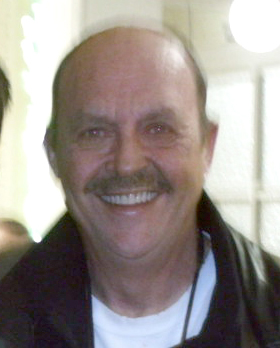
John Ashton

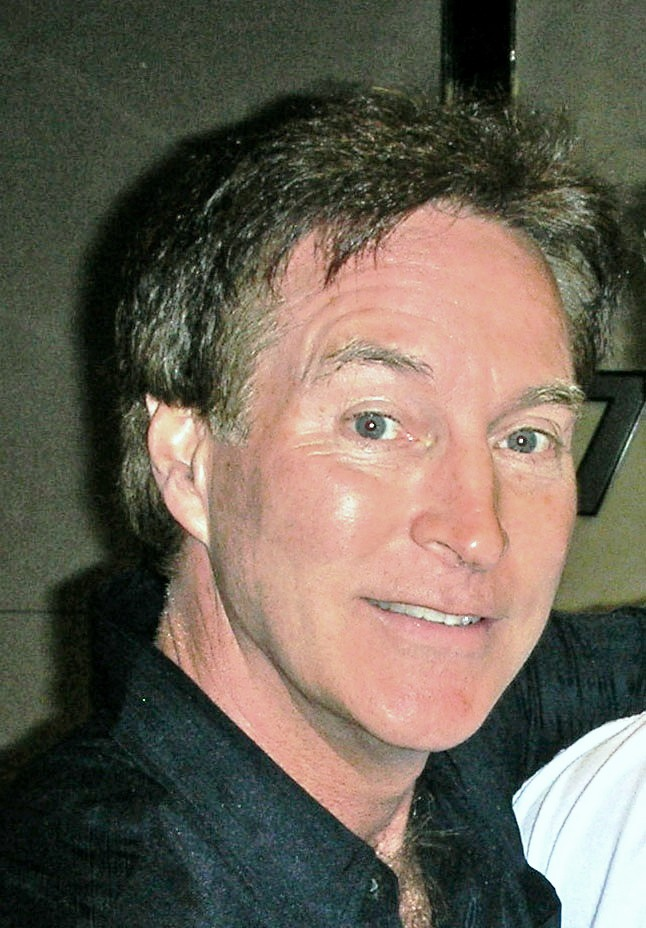
Drake Hogestyn

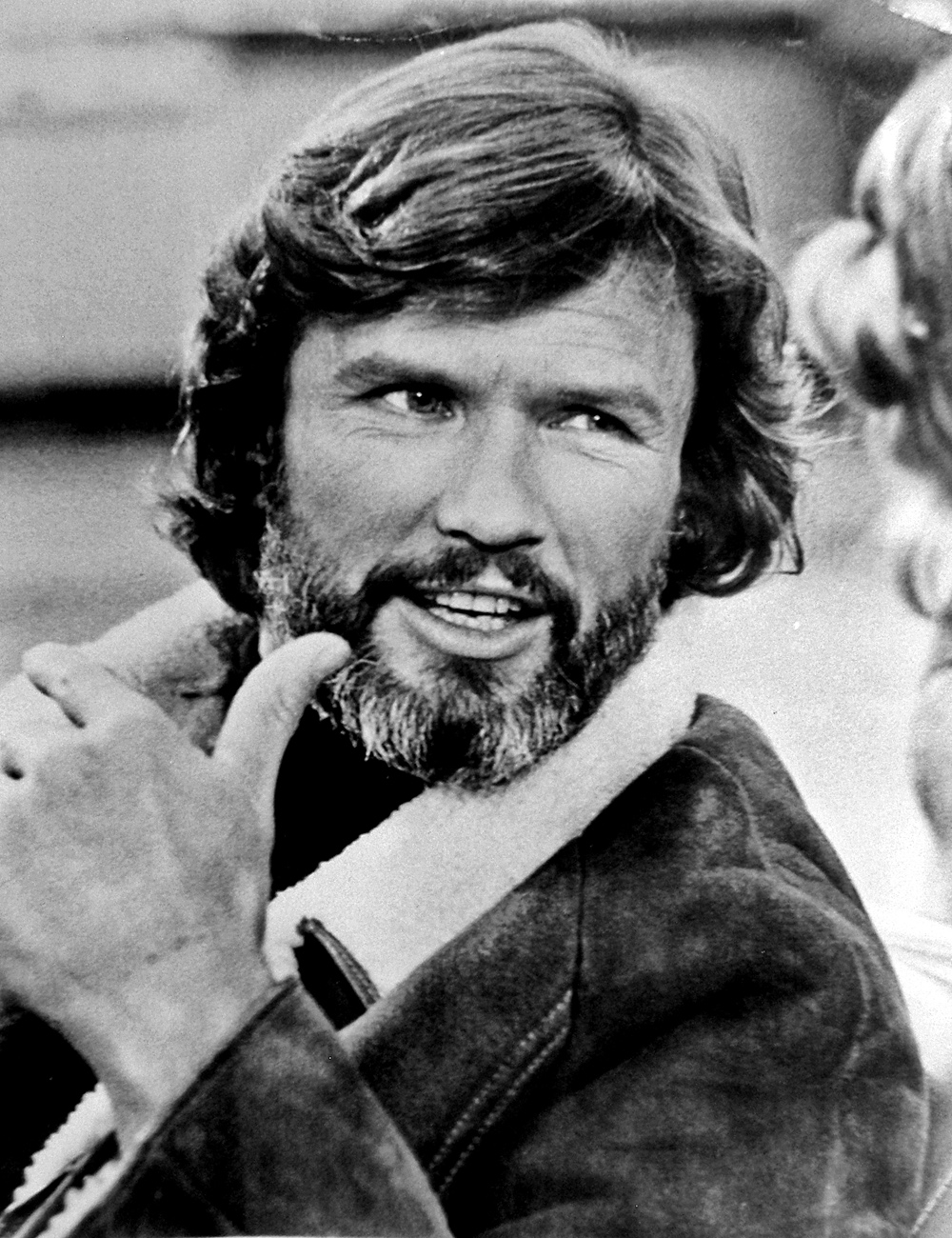
Kris Kristofferson

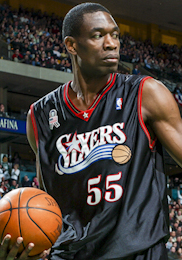
Dikembe Mutombo

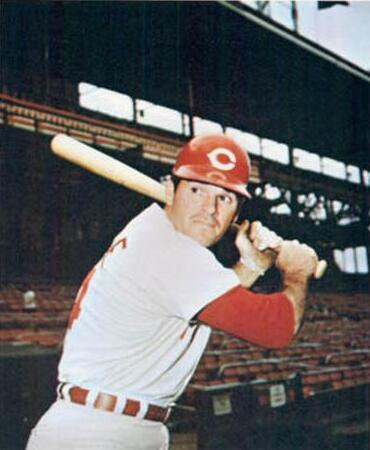
Pete Rose

- September 1
  - Jeffrey L. Bada, 81, chemist.
  - Bob Blaylock, 89, baseball player (St. Louis Cardinals) (b. 1935)
  - Teresa Bright, 64, guitarist and ukulele player (b. 1960)
  - Tom Brown, 91, politician, member of the Florida House of Representatives (1980–1986) (b. 1933)
  - Linda Deutsch, 80, journalist (Associated Press) (b. 1943)
  - Eric Gilliland, 62, television producer and writer (Roseanne, That '70s Show, My Boys) (b. 1962)
  - William E. Leber, 91, politician, member of the New Hampshire House of Representatives (1996–2004) (b. 1932)
  - Robert W. Rust, 96, politician, member of the Florida House of Representatives (1966–1968) (b. 1928)
  - Frederick Schauer, 78, legal philosopher (b. 1946)
- September 2
  - James B. Allen, 97, historian (b. 1927)
  - James Darren, 88, actor (Gidget, The Time Tunnel, T. J. Hooker) and singer ("Goodbye Cruel World") (b. 1936)
  - H. Jeff Kimble, 75, physicist and academic (b. 1949)
  - Pat Lewis, 76, soul singer (b. 1947) (death announced on this date)
- September 3
  - María Benítez, 82, dancer and choreographer (b. 1942)
  - John Allen Clements, 101, physician (b. 1923)
  - Wayne Graham, 88, baseball player (Philadelphia Phillies, New York Mets) and coach (Rice Owls) (b. 1936)
  - Charley Johnson, 85, football player (St. Louis Cardinals, Houston Oilers, Denver Broncos) (b. 1938)
  - Jacqueline Winsor, 82, Canadian-born sculptor (b. 1941) (death announced on this date)
  - Robert C. Wise, 99, politician, member of the Pennsylvania House of Representatives (1965–1974) (b. 1925)
- September 4
  - Michael McDonald, 61, costume designer (Hair) (b. 1963)
- September 5
  - Gerald Matzke, 93, politician, member of the Nebraska Legislature (1993–2001) (b. 1931)
  - Rich Homie Quan, 34, rapper ("Type of Way", "Flex (Ooh, Ooh, Ooh)", "Ride Out") (b. 1989)
  - Earline S. Rogers, 89, politician, member of the Indiana House of Representatives (1982–1990) and Senate (1990–2016) (b. 1934)
- September 6
  - Kelly Alexander, 75, politician, member of the North Carolina House of Representatives (since 2009) (b. 1948)
  - Lucine Amara, 99, soprano (b. 1925)
  - Edson de Castro, 85, computer engineer and businessman (b. 1938)
  - Walter G. Ehmer, 58, businessman, CEO of Waffle House (since 2012) (b. 1966)
  - Ayşenur Ezgi Eygi, 26, Turkish-born human rights activist and protester (b. 1998)
  - Paul Goldsmith, 98, racing driver, nine-time NASCAR Cup Series winner (b. 1925)
  - Will Jennings, 80, lyricist ("My Heart Will Go On", "Higher Love", "Looks Like We Made It") (b. 1944)
  - Mike Lewis, 75, football player (Atlanta Falcons, Green Bay Packers) (b. 1949)
  - Charles F. McMillan, 69, nuclear physicist, director of the Los Alamos National Laboratory (2011–2017) (b. 1954/1955)
  - Screamin' Scott Simon, 75, pianist (Sha Na Na) (b. 1948)
  - Johnny Thunder, 93, singer ("Loop de Loop") (b. 1931)
- September 7
  - Alan Feinstein, 93, philanthropist (b. 1931)
  - Jimmy Gilmer, 83, musician (The Fireballs) (b. 1940)
  - Harry Leary, 65, BMX racer (b. 1959)
  - Dan Morgenstern, 94, German-born music journalist (Jazz Journal, DownBeat) and archivist, eight-time Grammy winner (b. 1929)
  - Diondre Overton, 26, football player (Clemson Tigers, Hamilton Tiger-Cats, Vienna Vikings) (b. 1998)
- September 8
  - Allen Aldridge, 52, football player (Denver Broncos, Detroit Lions) (b. 1972)
  - Robert A. Collier Jr., 93, judge and politician, member of the North Carolina House of Representatives (1965–1967) (b. 1931)
  - Morriss Henry, 92, politician, member of the Arkansas House of Representatives (1967–1970) and Senate (1971–1974) (b. 1931)
  - Ed Kranepool, 79, baseball player (New York Mets) (b. 1944)
  - Bud Muehleisen, 92, racquetball and paddleball player (b. 1931)
  - Harley Refsal, 79, woodcarver (b. 1944)
  - Peter Renaday, 89, voice actor (Teenage Mutant Ninja Turtles, The Transformers, The Black Cauldron) (b. 1935)
  - Robert F. Titus, 97, brigadier general and career fighter pilot (b. 1926)
- September 9
  - John Cassaday, 52, comic book artist (Planetary, Astonishing X-Men, Captain America) (b. 1971)
  - Robert A. Chase, 101, surgeon (b. 1923)
  - Carroll Dawson, 86, basketball assistant coach and general manager (Houston Rockets) (b. 1938)
  - James Earl Jones, 93, actor (Star Wars, Fences, The Lion King), Tony winner (1969, 1987) (b. 1931)
  - Minnie Mendoza, 89, Cuban-born baseball player (Minnesota Twins) (b. 1934)
  - Herbert S. White, 97, Austrian-born librarian (b. 1927)
  - Mitchell Wiggins, 64, basketball player (Chicago Bulls, Houston Rockets, Philadelphia 76ers) (b. 1959)
- September 10
  - Brian Aldridge, 47, politician, member of the Mississippi House of Representatives (2004–2016) (b. 1977)
  - Tina McElroy Ansa, 74, novelist and journalist (b. 1949)
  - Frankie Beverly, 77, singer (Maze) and songwriter ("Before I Let Go") (b. 1946)
  - Michaela DePrince, 29, Sierra Leonean-born ballet dancer (Dance Theatre of Harlem, Dutch National Ballet, Boston Ballet) (b. 1995)
  - Dusko Doder, 87, journalist (The Washington Post) (b. 1937)
  - Arthur Edgehill, 98, jazz drummer (b. 1926)
  - Kevin Long, 69, football player (South Carolina Gamecocks, New York Jets, Arizona Wranglers) (b. 1955)
  - Jim Sasser, 87, politician, U.S. senator (1977–1995) and ambassador to China (1996–1999) (b. 1936)
- September 11
  - Elaine DePrince, 77, author and activist (b. 1947)
  - Steve Gregg, 68, swimmer, Olympic silver medalist (1976) (b. 1955)
  - Chad McQueen, 63, actor (The Karate Kid, Martial Law, Red Line) and racing driver (b. 1960)
  - Karl Moline, 51, comic book artist (Fray, Route 666, Loners) (b. 1972/1973) (death announced on this date)
  - Joe Schmidt, 92, Hall of Fame football player and coach (Detroit Lions), NFL champion (1953, 1957) (b. 1932)
  - Daniel Starr, 90, college athletics administrator (Canisius University)
- September 12
  - Harry W. Crosby, 98, historian and photographer (b. 1926)
  - Joseph G. Gall, 96, biologist (b. 1928)
  - Gabriel Gonzalez, 57, musician (No Doubt, Save Ferris) (b. 1967)
  - Hank, 12–13, sports mascot dog (Milwaukee Brewers) (b. 2012)
  - Greg Harden, 75, athletics administrator and motivational speaker (b. 1948/1949)
  - Charles W. Moore, 84, football player (Tennessee State Tigers) and coach (Bethune–Cookman Wildcats, Langston University) (b. 1939/1940)
  - Guy Robinson, 85, racing driver (b. 1939)
- September 13
  - Tommy Cash, 84, country musician (b. 1940)
  - Chalmers Davis, 73, keyboardist (Little Richard, Johnny Cash, The Shooters) (b. 1951)
  - Harold D. Guither, 97, agricultural economist and writer (b. 1927)
  - J. Gorman Houston Jr., 91, judge, justice of the Supreme Court of Alabama (1985–2005) (b. 1943)
  - Mary McFadden, 85, fashion designer (b. 1938)
  - Mark Podwal, 79, artist, author, and filmmaker (b. 1945)
  - Edward James Slattery, 84, Roman Catholic prelate, bishop of Tulsa (1993–2016) (b. 1940)
- September 14
  - Otis Davis, 92, sprinter, Olympic gold medalist (1960) (b. 1932)
  - Fred Nall Hollis, 76, artist (b. 1948)
  - Charles Riggins, 64, football player (Tampa Bay Buccaneers) (b. 1959)
  - Richard Allen Thompson, 90, politician, member of the Indiana House of Representatives (1979–1984) and Senate (1984–1996) (b. 1934)
- September 15
  - David Davis, 63, bluegrass musician (b. 1961)
  - Tito Jackson, 70, Hall of Fame musician (The Jackson 5) (b. 1953)
  - Basil H. Losten, 94, Ukrainian Greek Catholic hierarch, auxiliary bishop of Philadelphia (1971–1977) and bishop of Stamford (1977–2006) (b. 1930)
  - Roli Mosimann, 68, Swiss-born musician (Swans) and record producer (Mind Bomb, Album of the Year) (b. 1955)
  - Miye Ota, 106, ballroom dancer and businesswoman (b. 1918)
- September 16
  - Tyrone C. Fahner, 81, politician and lawyer, Illinois Attorney General (1980–1983) (b. 1942)
  - Harrison J. Goldin, 88, politician, New York City comptroller (1974–1989) (b. 1936)
  - Robert Lansdorp, 85, tennis coach (b. 1938) (death announced on this date)
  - Curtis McCormack, 72, politician, member of the Vermont House of Representatives (1983–1996, 2013–2022) (b. 1952)
  - Steve Oelrich, 78, politician and law enforcement officer, member of the Florida Senate (2006–2012) (b. 1945)
  - Barbara C. Pringle, 85, politician, member of the Ohio House of Representatives (1982–2000) (b. 1939)
  - Roy Reiman, 90, philanthropist and publicist, founder of Reiman Publications (b. 1934)
  - Billy Edd Wheeler, 91, singer and songwriter ("Jackson", "It's Midnight", "Coward of the County") (b. 1932)
- September 17
  - Evin Agassi, 78, Iranian-born singer (b. 1945)
  - Gene Cronin, 90, football player (Detroit Lions, Washington Redskins, Dallas Cowboys) (b. 1933)
  - Jim Cullivan, 103, football coach (Murray State Racers) (b. 1921)
  - Nelson DeMille, 81, novelist (Plum Island, The General's Daughter, The Charm School) (b. 1943)
  - Priscilla Dunn, 80, politician, member of the Alabama House of Representatives (1998–2009) and Alabama Senate (2009–2022) (b. 1943)
  - Neil King Jr., 65, journalist and author (b. 1959)
  - JD Souther, 78, singer ("You're Only Lonely") and songwriter ("New Kid in Town") (b. 1945)
  - Donnell Thompson, 65, football player (Baltimore/Indianapolis Colts) (b. 1958)
  - Peter Tiboris, 78, conductor (b. 1947)
- September 18
  - Juan Brujo, 61, singer (Brujeria) (b. 1963)
  - Nick Gravenites, 85, blues musician (The Electric Flag, Big Brother and the Holding Company) and record producer ("One Toke Over the Line") (b. 1938)
  - Ella Leffland, 92, novelist and short story writer (b. 1931)
  - Sehat Sutardja, 63, Indonesian-born businessman, co-founder of Marvell Technology (b. 1961)
- September 19
  - Jay J. Armes, 92, private investigator and politician (b. 1932)
  - Bobby Lewis, 78, basketball player (South Carolina State, Wilmington Bombers) and coach (Haverford College) (b. 1946)
  - Daniel McMahon, 41, musician, producer and audio engineer (b. 1982)
  - Kevin Mullins, 54, judge (b. 1969/1970)
  - Florence Warner, 77, singer (b. 1947)
  - Jonathan Wells, 82, pseudoscientific biologist (Icons of Evolution) (b. 1942)
  - Eduardo Xol, 58, actor and designer (Extreme Makeover: Home Edition) (b. 1966)
- September 20
  - Victor Barnett, 91, British-born businessman (b. 1933)
  - Kathryn Crosby, 90, actress (The 7th Voyage of Sinbad, Anatomy of a Murder, Operation Mad Ball) (b. 1933)
  - Richard Dyer, 82, music critic (b. 1941)
  - Daniel J. Evans, 98, politician, governor of Washington (1965–1977) and member of the U.S. Senate (1983–1989) (b. 1925)
  - Darrell Opfer, 83, politician, member of the Ohio House of Representatives (1993–1999) (b. 1941)
  - Freddie Eugene Owens, 46, convicted murderer (b. 1978)
  - Kim Richmond, 84, jazz saxophonist and composer (b. 1940)
  - George K. Schweitzer, 99, chemist (b. 1924)
  - Jon Svendsen, 70, water polo player, Olympic silver medallist (1984) (b. 1953)
  - Randy West, 76, pornographic actor (b. 1947)
- September 21
  - Paul Cripple, guitarist (Reagan Youth).
  - Benny Golson, 95, saxophonist, composer and arranger (b. 1929)
  - Al McCoy, 91, sportscaster (Phoenix Suns) (b. 1933) (death announced on this date)
  - Mercury Morris, 77, football player (Miami Dolphins, San Diego Chargers), Super Bowl champion (1972, 1973) (b. 1947)
  - Dick Moss, 93, labor lawyer (b. 1931)
  - Tom Spanbauer, 78, author (The Man Who Fell in Love with the Moon) (b. 1946)
  - Melvin L. Stukes, 76, politician, member of the Baltimore City Council (1991–2004) and Maryland House of Delegates (2007–2015) (b. 1948)
- September 22
  - Roy Clay, 95, computer scientist (b. 1929)
  - Fredric Jameson, 90, philosopher (Postmodernism, or, the Cultural Logic of Late Capitalism, The Political Unconscious) (b. 1934)
  - Hugh Prestwood, 82, singer-songwriter (b. 1942)
  - L. James Sullivan, 91, firearms designer (b. 1933)
- September 23
  - David Curson, 75, politician, member of the U.S. House of Representatives (2012–2013) (b. 1948)
  - Mike Elliott, 82, Olympic cross-country skier (1964, 1968, 1972) (b. 1942)
  - A. D. Frazier, 80, business executive (b. 1944)
  - Murray Greenfield, 98, American-born Israeli writer (b. 1926)
  - Gary Reineke, 84, American-born Canadian actor (The Grey Fox, Street Legal, Iron Eagle II) (b. 1940)
  - Freddie Salem, 70, guitarist (Outlaws) (b. 1954) (death announced on this date)
  - Alan Vera, 33, Cuban-born Greco-Roman wrestler (b. 1990)
- September 24
  - Cat Glover, 62, choreographer and musician ("Alphabet St.") (b. 1962) (death announced on this date)
  - Travis James Mullis, 38, child murderer (b. 1986)
  - Walter Neumann, 78, British-born mathematician (b. 1946)
- September 25
  - John Baumgartner, 93, baseball player (Detroit Tigers) (b. 1931)
  - Marcus R. Clark, 68, judge, associate justice of the Louisiana Supreme Court (2009–2020) (b. 1956)
  - June Frazer, 88, politician, member of the New Hampshire House of Representatives (2010–2016) (b. 1936).
  - William Lucy, 90, trade union leader (b. 1933)
  - John Warwick Montgomery, 92, Christian apologist and theologian (b. 1931)
  - Rocky Moran, 74, racing driver (IMSA, CART) (b. 1950) (death announced on this date)
  - Edwin L. Pittman, 89, jurist, attorney general of Mississippi (1984–1988), judge (1989–2004) and chief judge (2001–2004) of the Supreme Court of Mississippi (b. 1935)
- September 26
  - John Ashton, 76, actor (Beverly Hills Cop, Some Kind of Wonderful, Midnight Run) (b. 1948)
  - Richard Mayhew, 100, painter, illustrator, and arts educator (b. 1924)
  - Alan Eugene Miller, 59, spree killer (b. 1965)
  - Dan Morse, 89, archaeologist (b. 1935)
  - Jeffrey P. Victory, 78, judge, associate justice of the Louisiana Supreme Court (1995–2014) (b. 1946)
  - Joe Wolf, 59, basketball player (Milwaukee Bucks) and coach (Wisconsin Herd) (b. 1964)
- September 27
  - Joey Jay, 89, baseball player (Milwaukee Braves, Cincinnati Reds, Atlanta Braves) (b. 1935)
  - John McNeil, 76, jazz trumpeter (b. 1948)
  - Thomas Rockwell, 91, author (How to Eat Fried Worms) (b. 1933)
- September 28
  - Warren Bickel, 68, behavioral pharmacologist (b. 1955/1956)
  - Winfield Dunn, 97, politician, governor of Tennessee (1971–1975) (b. 1927)
  - Drake Hogestyn, 70, actor (Days of Our Lives, Seven Brides for Seven Brothers) (b. 1953)
  - Kris Kristofferson, 88, Hall of Fame singer-songwriter ("Me and Bobby McGee", "Help Me Make It Through the Night") and actor (A Star Is Born), Grammy winner (1972, 1974, 1975) (b. 1936)
- September 29
  - Ron Ely, 86, actor (Tarzan, The Night of the Grizzly, Doc Savage: The Man of Bronze) (b. 1938)
  - Richard S. Hamilton, 81, mathematician (b. 1943)
  - Archie Karas, 73, Greek-born gambler and poker player (b. 1950) (death announced on this date)
  - Bismarck Myrick, 83, diplomat, ambassador to Lesotho (1995–1998) and Liberia (1999–2002) (b. 1940)
- September 30
  - Gavin Creel, 48, actor (Thoroughly Modern Millie, The Book of Mormon, Hello, Dolly!) and singer (b. 1976)
  - Mike Dmitrich, 87, politician, member of the Utah Senate (1993–2009) (b. 1936)
  - Robert Fitzpatrick, 84, art executive, president of the California Institute of the Arts (1975–1988) (b. 1940)
  - Frank Fritz, 60, antique picker and reality television host (American Pickers) (b. 1964)
  - Dikembe Mutombo, 58, Hall of Fame Congolese-born basketball player (Denver Nuggets, Atlanta Hawks, Houston Rockets) (b. 1966)
  - Ken Page, 70, actor (The Wiz, Ain't Misbehavin', Cats, The Nightmare Before Christmas) (b. 1954)
  - Catherine Riley, 77, civil servant and politician, member of the Maryland House of Delegates (1975–1982) and Senate (1983–1990) (b. 1947)
  - Pete Rose, 83, baseball player (Cincinnati Reds, Philadelphia Phillies), three-time World Series champion (b. 1941)
