= Deaths in September 2024 =

The following is a list of notable deaths in September 2024.

Entries for each day are listed alphabetically by surname. A typical entry lists information in the following sequence:

- Name, age, country of citizenship at birth, subsequent country of citizenship (if applicable), reason for notability, cause of death (if known), and reference.

== September 2024 ==
=== 1 ===
- Abel Alonso, 89, Spanish-Chilean shoemaker and football executive (Unión Española), president of the ANFP (1979–1982).
- K. J. Baby, 70, Indian writer. (body discovered on this date)
- Jeffrey L. Bada, 81, American chemist.
- Bob Blaylock, 89, American baseball player (St. Louis Cardinals).
- Tim Bowden, 87, Australian historian and television presenter.
- Teresa Bright, 64, American guitarist and ukulele player.
- Tom Brown, 91, American politician, member of the Florida House of Representatives (1980–1986).
- Denis Browne, 86, New Zealand Roman Catholic prelate, bishop of Rarotonga (1977–1983), Auckland (1983–1994) and Hamilton (1994–2014).
- Jorge Canda, 70–71, Spanish politician, mayor of A Lama (1995–2023), member of the Provincial Deputation of Pontevedra (2015–2017).
- Norman Chui, 73, Hong Kong actor (Vengeful Beauty, Heaven Sword and Dragon Sabre, Hong Kong Godfather), esophageal cancer.
- Norman Davidson, 93, Scottish cricketer (national team) and rugby union player (Scotland national rugby union team).
- Linda Deutsch, 80, American journalist (Associated Press), pancreatic cancer.
- Eric Gilliland, 62, American television producer and writer (Roseanne, That '70s Show, My Boys), colon cancer.
- Lindsey Ginter, 73, American actor (Pearl Harbor, Argo, Mercury Rising).
- Leroy Harris, 70, American football player (Miami Dolphins, Philadelphia Eagles).
- Naftali Herstik, 77, Hungarian-born Israeli hazzan.
- William E. Leber, 91, American politician, member of the New Hampshire House of Representatives (1996–2004).
- Budimir Lončar, 100, Croatian diplomat, minister of foreign affairs of Yugoslavia (1987–1991).
- Àngels Martínez Castells, 76, Spanish economist, academic and politician, member of the Parliament of Catalonia (2015–2017).
- Makrand Mehta, 93, Indian historian, dengue.
- Chieko Oda, 77, Japanese Olympic gymnast (1968).
- Sergio Rivero, 60, Bolivian footballer (Real Santa Cruz, Oriente Petrolero, national team).
- Robert W. Rust, 96, American politician, member of the Florida House of Representatives (1966–1968).
- Irene Ryder, 75, Hong Kong singer.
- Franz Sauerzopf, 92, Austrian judge and politician, member of the Landtag Burgenland (1972–1986).
- Frederick Schauer, 78, American legal philosopher, kidney disease.
- John Schultz, 85, Australian Hall of Fame footballer (Footscray).
- Romárico Sotomayor García, 85, Cuban soldier and politician, deputy (2008–2013).
- Evert Svensson, 99, Swedish sociologist and politician, MP (1957–1991).
- Brian Trueman, 92, English broadcaster (Screen Test), writer (Danger Mouse) and voice actor (Count Duckula).
- Keisuke Tsunoda, 91, Japanese table tennis player.
- Ahu Tuğba, 69, Turkish actress (Şeytan, Banker Bilo, Beyaz Ölüm).
- Umesh Upadhyay, 66, Indian media executive (Reliance Industries Limited, Network 18) and writer, fall.

=== 2 ===
- Rashad Abu Sakhila, 23, Palestinian actor and poet, airstrike.
- James B. Allen, 97, American historian.
- Mick Cullen, 93, Scottish footballer (Luton Town, Grimsby Town, national team).
- James Darren, 88, American singer ("Goodbye Cruel World") and actor (Gidget, T. J. Hooker), heart failure.
- Wayne Duke, 69, Australian footballer (Fitzroy).
- Rodolfo Hernández Suárez, 79, Colombian civil engineer and politician, senator (2022) and mayor of Bucaramanga (2016–2019), complications from cancer surgery.
- Jerry Inman, 84, American football player (Oregon Ducks, Denver Broncos).
- H. Jeff Kimble, 75, American physicist and academic.
- Kong Sam Ol, 94, Cambodian politician, MP (since 1993), minister of agriculture (1986–1989) and the Royal Palace (since 1998).
- Zdravko Krstanović, 74, Serbian poet, prose writer, and critic (Slobodna Dalmacija).
- Mihály Kupa, 83, Hungarian politician, minister of finance (1990–1993). (death announced on this date)
- Pat Lewis, 76, American singer.
- Sante Marsili, 73, Italian water polo player, Olympic silver medalist (1976).
- Raul Martirez, 86, Filipino Roman Catholic prelate, bishop of San Jose de Antique (1983–2002), stroke.
- Aleksandr Medved, 86, Belarusian freestyle wrestler, Olympic champion (1964, 1968, 1972).
- Fadhil al-Milani, 80, Iraqi-Iranian academic, author and community leader.
- Bernie Mireault, 63, French-born Canadian comic book artist (The Jam), suicide.
- Pádraic Monaghan, 65, Irish Gaelic footballer (Garrymore, St Jude's, Mayo).
- Manuel Montoya, 64, Spanish handball coach (Romania national team, Iran national team).
- Dumezweni Mthimkhulu, Motswana politician, MP (since 2019).
- Merle Parkes, 97, Australian nurse educator.
- Edgardo Luis Paruzzo, 70, Argentine footballer (Quilmes, Tigre, Almirante Brown).
- Daniel Patte, 85, French-born American biblical scholar and author.
- Vladimir Turiyansky, 89, Russian poet and composer.
- Jean Winn, 94, English table tennis player.

=== 3 ===
- María Benítez, 82, American dancer and choreographer.
- Vladimir Bure, 73, Russian swimmer and ice hockey fitness consultant, Olympic silver medallist (1972), complications from a heart attack.
- John Allen Clements, 101, American physician.
- Kazimierz Działocha, 92, Polish judge and politician, judge of the constitutional tribunal (1985–1993), senator (1995–1997), MP (1997–2001).
- Clive Freeman, 61, English footballer (Swansea City, Altrincham, Doncaster Rovers).
- Göran Fristorp, 76, Swedish singer and songwriter (Malta).
- Ivan Garelov, 81, Bulgarian journalist and television presenter (Nova TV, BTV), complications from traumatic brain injury.
- Guido Carlo Gatti, 86, Italian Olympic basketball player (1968).
- Wayne Graham, 88, American Hall of Fame baseball coach (Rice Owls) and player (Philadelphia Phillies, New York Mets).
- William Handal Raudales, 78–79, Honduran politician, vice president (1998–2002).
- Stephan Harding, 70–71, Venezuelan-born British zoologist and ecologist.
- Duncan Ironmonger, 92, Australian household economist and statistician.
- Charley Johnson, 85, American football player (St. Louis Cardinals, Houston Oilers, Denver Broncos).
- Alberto Jorge, 74, Argentine football player (Racing Club, León) and manager (Toluca).
- James Likoudis, 95, American Catholic theologian.
- Margaret Manion, 88, Australian art historian and curator.
- Georg Meiring, 84, South African military officer, chief of the Army (1990–1993) and SANDF (1993–1998).
- Tom Myers, 81, American football player (Detroit Lions).
- Barbara S. Nielsen, 81, American politician, South Carolina superintendent of education (1991–1999).
- Peeco, 79, Japanese tarento, fashion critic, and journalist, multiple organ failure.
- James Scott Pringle, 87, American botanical historian.
- Zdeněk Rylich, 93, Czech basketball player (Czechoslovakia national team).
- Flora Fraser, 21st Lady Saltoun, 93, Scottish peer, member of the House of Lords (1979–2014).
- Beverley Shore Bennett, 95, New Zealand portrait and stained-glass artist.
- Igor Spassky, 98, Russian nuclear engineer (Delta III, Typhoon and Oscar submarines).
- Gottfried Teubner, 79, German politician, member of the Landtag of Saxony (1990–2009).
- Mike Torode, 83, Guernsey politician, chief minister (2007–2008).
- Jacqueline Winsor, 82, Canadian-born American sculptor, stroke.
- Robert C. Wise, 99, American politician, member of the Pennsylvania House of Representatives (1965–1974).

=== 4 ===
- Xabier Añoveros Trías de Bes, 80, Spanish academic and historian.
- Luis Ayala, 91, Chilean tennis player.
- John Cheshire, 91, Welsh rugby footballer (Salford, Oldham, national team).
- Graeme Clyne, 83, Australian footballer (Fitzroy).
- Oswald d'Andréa, 90, French pianist and film composer (Life and Nothing But, Captain Conan).
- Bora Đorđević, 71, Serbian singer-songwriter (Riblja Čorba), pneumonia.
- Colin Fournier, 79, British architect.
- Olavi Heinonen, 85, Finnish judge, president of the Supreme Court (1989–2001).
- Sergey Ivanenko, 65, Russian economist and politician, deputy (1993–2003).
- Céline Orgelle Kentsop, 54, Cameroonian actress, hemorrhagic stroke.
- Mark Loveday, 80, British stockbroker, motor neurone disease.
- Michael McDonald, 61, American costume designer (Hair).
- Hermes Ramírez, 76, Cuban sprinter, Olympic silver medallist (1968).
- Joe Reaiche, 66, Australian rugby league player (Eastern Suburbs) and whistleblower.
- David Rose, 81, English football club secretary (Ipswich Town).
- Jacques Rouchouse, 78, French radio producer and music critic.
- Larry Trader, 61, Canadian ice hockey player (Detroit Red Wings, St. Louis Blues, Montreal Canadiens).
- Yang Jen-fu, 82, Taiwanese politician, member of the Legislative Yuan (1999–2012).

=== 5 ===
- Manuel Antín, 98, Argentine film director (Don Segundo Sombra, Circe, The Venerable Ones).
- Faisal Basri, 64, Indonesian economist and politician, heart disease.
- Derek Boshier, 87, English pop artist.
- Jacques Breuer, 67, Austrian actor (Derrick, The Second Victory), stroke.
- Roy Cape, 82, Trinidadian calypso saxophonist, stroke.
- Rebecca Cheptegei, 33, Ugandan Olympic long-distance runner (2024), burned.
- Georgi Dimitrov, 94, Bulgarian Olympic alpine skier.
- Cecil Dixon, 89, English footballer (Cardiff City, Newport County).
- Herbie Flowers, 86, English musician (Blue Mink, T. Rex, Sky).
- Elio Fontana, 83, Italian politician, deputy (1979–1983), senator (1983–1994).
- Martin France, 60, British jazz drummer.
- David Goldberg, 90, British academic and social psychiatrist.
- Radha Charan Gupta, 89, Indian mathematics historian.
- Kan Lai Bing, 91, Hong Kong librarian, director of the Chinese University of Hong Kong Library (1972–1983).
- Kim Wang-Sik, 71, South Korean political historian, director of the National Museum of Korean Contemporary History (2012–2015), carbon monoxide poisoning.
- Davy Kiprotich Koech, 73, Kenyan immunologist, founder of KEMRI.
- Robin Lloyd-Jones, 89, British author.
- Gerald Matzke, 93, American politician, member of the Nebraska Legislature (1993–2001).
- Sérgio Mendes, 83, Brazilian bossa nova musician ("The Look of Love", "The Fool on the Hill", "Never Gonna Let You Go"), Grammy winner (1993), complications from long COVID.
- Werner Nachtigall, 90, German zoologist and biologist.
- Oleksandr Rezanov, 75, Ukrainian handball player, Olympic champion (1976).
- Rich Homie Quan, 34, American rapper ("Type of Way", "Flex (Ooh, Ooh, Ooh)", "Ride Out"), drug overdose.
- Jorge Rivera López, 90, Argentine actor (Pobres habrá siempre, La Mary, Proceso a la infamia).
- Earline S. Rogers, 89, American politician, member of the Indiana House of Representatives (1982–1990) and Senate (1990–2016).
- Bill Scrimshire, 86, American politician, member of the Arkansas House of Representatives (1999–2005).
- Augusto M. Seabra, 69, Portuguese music and film critic.
- Screamin' Scott Simon, 75, American pianist and singer (Sha Na Na), sinus cancer.
- Władysław Słowiński, 94, Polish composer and conductor.
- Laurent Tirard, 57, French film director (Little Nicholas, Asterix and Obelix: God Save Britannia, Return of the Hero).
- Aruna Vasudev, 87, Indian film scholar and critic.
- Turhan Nejat Veziroğlu, 100, Turkish-born American engineer.

=== 6 ===
- Kelly Alexander, 75, American politician, member of the North Carolina House of Representatives (since 2009).
- Lucine Amara, 99, American soprano, heart failure.
- Roger Blackmore, 82, English politician, lord mayor of Leicester (2009–2010).
- Lorenzo Ceresoli, 93, Italian Roman Catholic prelate, vicar apostolic of Awasa (1993–2009).
- John Coulter, 93, Australian medical researcher and politician, senator (1987–1995).
- Stephen D. Cox, 76, American author and academic.
- Edson de Castro, 85, American computer engineer and businessman.
- Walter G. Ehmer, 58, American businessman, CEO of Waffle House (since 2012), cancer.
- Ayşenur Eygi, 26, Turkish-born American human rights activist and protester, shot.
- Armand de Fluvià, 92, Spanish genealogist, heraldist and LGBT rights activist, respiratory failure.
- Melina Furman, 49, Argentine educator, popularizer and researcher (National Scientific and Technical Research Council), colon cancer.
- Gustavo García de Paredes, 85, Panamanian educator and politician, rector of the University of Panama (1997–2016), manager of the Colón Free Trade Zone (1981–1982).
- Paul Goldsmith, 98, American racing driver.
- David Headley Green, 88, Tasmanian-born Australian geologist.
- Virgil L. Hill Jr., 86, American rear admiral.
- Rebecca Horn, 80, German visual artist and film director (Buster's Bedroom).
- Neil Inall, 91, Australian agronomist, journalist, and television presenter (Always on Sunday).
- Sonia Iovan, 88, Romanian gymnast, Olympic bronze medallist (1956, 1960).
- Will Jennings, 80, American Hall of Fame lyricist ("My Heart Will Go On", "Tears in Heaven", "Up Where We Belong"), Oscar winner (1983, 1998), Grammy winner (1993, 1999).
- Alfredo Karam, 99, Brazilian military officer and politician, commander of the navy (1984–1985).
- Mervin Kaye, 95, Canadian Olympic rower.
- John R. Lampe, 88, American historian.
- Mike Lewis, 75, American football player (Atlanta Falcons, Green Bay Packers).
- Charles F. McMillan, 69, American nuclear physicist, director of Los Alamos National Laboratory (2011–2017), traffic collision.
- Cathy Merrick, 62, Canadian First Nations leader, grand chief of the Assembly of Manitoba Chiefs (since 2022).
- Renato Molinari, 78, Italian powerboat racer.
- Marty Morton, 82, Australian entertainer, cancer.
- Pim de la Parra, 84, Surinamese-Dutch film director (Wan Pipel, Frank en Eva) and film producer (Blue Movie).
- Alan Rees, 86, British racing driver.
- Gaetano Salvemini, 82, Italian football player and manager (Genoa, Palermo, Empoli).
- Marie Michele St. Louis, 55, Mauritian Olympic judoka (1996).
- Vladas Terleckas, 84, Lithuanian politician.
- Johnny Thunder, 93, American singer ("Loop de Loop").
- Horst Weigang, 83, German footballer (Lokomotive Leipzig, Rot-Weiß Erfurt), Olympic bronze medallist (1964).
- Bent Wolmar, 87, Danish footballer (AGF, national team).
- Ron Yeats, 86, Scottish football player (Liverpool, national team) and manager (Tranmere Rovers), complications from Alzheimer's disease.

=== 7 ===
- James Byrne, 76, Irish fraudster.
- Anthony Checchia, 94, American arts administrator and bassoonist.
- Pierre Consigny, 94, French government official and politician, president of the French Red Cross (1994–1997).
- Darcy, 69, Brazilian footballer (Guarani, Sport Recife, Portuguesa), cancer.
- Max Dauphin, 47, Luxembourgish painter.
- Alan Feinstein, 93, American philanthropist.
- Jimmy Gilmer, 83, American singer.
- Michael Guider, 73, Australian convicted paedophile and child killer.
- Timothy Hyman, 78, British painter.
- Bud Irving, 98, Canadian football player (Winnipeg Blue Bombers).
- Archie Karas, 73, Greek-American gambler and poker player.
- Slavo Kukić, 70, Bosnian sociologist, member of the Academy of Sciences and Arts of Bosnia and Herzegovina.
- Harry Leary, 65, American BMX racer, heat exhaustion.
- James Matthews, 95, South African poet, writer and publisher.
- Dan Morgenstern, 94, German-born American music journalist (Jazz Journal, DownBeat) and archivist, eight-time Grammy winner, heart failure.
- Sarah Mateke Nyirabashitsi, 50, Ugandan politician, MP (since 2021), heart attack.
- Diondre Overton, 26, American football player (Clemson Tigers, Philadelphia Stars, Memphis Showboats), shot.
- Cesare Poli, 79, Italian footballer (Lanerossi Vicenza, Inter Milan, Cagliari).
- Heinrich Schmelz, 94, Austrian civil servant and politician, MP (1977–1988).
- Nancy Sununu, 85, American politician, first lady of New Hampshire (1983–1989), complications from Alzheimer's disease.
- Juozas Žilys, 82, Lithuanian lawyer and judge, member of the constitutional court (1993–1999).

=== 8 ===
- Allen Aldridge, 52, American football player (Denver Broncos, Detroit Lions, Houston Texans).
- Mauricio Arriaza Chicas, 59, Salvadoran police officer, director of the National Civil Police (since 2019), helicopter crash.
- Robert A. Collier Jr., 93, American judge and politician, member of the North Carolina House of Representatives (1965–1967).
- Ian Davidson, 84, British scriptwriter (The Two Ronnies, The Brittas Empire) and actor (Monty Python's Flying Circus).
- Paul Dodd, 88, Australian rules footballer (St. Kilda).
- David Dumville, 75, British medievalist and Celtic scholar.
- Ian Froman, 87, South African-born Israeli tennis player.
- Ana Gervasi, 57, Peruvian diplomat, minister of foreign affairs (2022–2023). (body discovered on this date)
- Robin Guy, 54, English drummer.
- Tarek Ali Hassan, 86, Egyptian composer and endocrinologist.
- Morriss Henry, 92, American politician, member of the Arkansas House of Representatives (1967–1970) and Senate (1971–1974).
- İlkan Karaman, 34, Turkish basketball player (Fenerbahçe, Tofaş Bursa, national team), traffic collision.
- Ed Kranepool, 79, American baseball player (New York Mets), cardiac arrest.
- John Lewis, 71, Australian rules footballer (Fitzroy).
- Viktor Lyadov, 58, Russian pianist.
- Mara Malavenda, 79, Italian trade unionist and politician, deputy (1996–2001).
- Robert Marcy, 104, French actor.
- Alexander Maslyakov, 82, Russian television game show host (KVN), lung cancer.
- Tatsuro Matsumae, 97, Japanese academic and politician, member of the House of Councillors (1977–2001), pneumonia.
- Maxwell McCombs, 85, American journalism scholar.
- Henny Moan, 88, Norwegian actress (Nine Lives, Lake of the Dead, O' Horten).
- Zoot Money, 82, English singer and keyboardist (The Animals, Zoot Money's Big Roll Band).
- Bud Muehleisen, 92, American racquetball and paddleball player, stroke.
- Puput Novel, 50, Indonesian singer, actress, and presenter, breast cancer.
- Harley Refsal, 79, American woodcarver.
- Peter Renaday, 89, American voice actor (Teenage Mutant Ninja Turtles, The Transformers, Assassin's Creed).
- Bob Salpeter, 88, American graphic designer.
- Vikas Sethi, 48, Indian actor (Kyunki Saas Bhi Kabhi Bahu Thi, Kahiin to Hoga, Kasautii Zindagii Kay), heart attack.
- Emi Shinohara, 61, Japanese voice actress (Sailor Moon, Naruto, Perfect Blue).
- Yves Simoens, 82, Belgian Jesuit priest, biblicist, and academic.
- Harry Smith, 96, British Egyptologist and academic.
- Andrzej Socharski, 77, Polish Olympic sports shooter (1976).
- Michel Soufflet, 94, French industrialist, chairman of The Soufflet Group (1957–2000).
- Ben Thapa, 42, English opera singer (G4).
- Tie Liu, 91, Chinese writer and political dissident.
- Robert F. Titus, 97, American air force brigadier general.
- Wu Chien-pao, 73, Taiwanese politician and convicted game fixer, member (1998–2011) and speaker (2002–2010) of the Tainan City Council, esophageal cancer.

=== 9 ===
- Md. Abdul Maleque, 77, Bangladeshi politician, MP (2013–2019).
- Carlos Ávila, 72, Honduran Olympic runner.
- Jean-Claude Berejnoï, 85, French rugby union player (national team).
- Carlos Bielicki, 84, Argentine chess master.
- John Cassaday, 52, American comic book artist (Planetary, Astonishing X-Men, Captain America), cardiac arrest.
- Robert A. Chase, 101, American surgeon.
- Lila Christoforidou, 84–85, Greek lawyer and politician, MP (1981–1985).
- Shomie Das, 89, Indian educationist.
- Carroll Dawson, 86, American basketball coach and executive (Baylor Bears, Houston Rockets).
- Marcello De Dorigo, 87, Italian Olympic cross-country skier (1960, 1964).
- Nick Dondas, 84, Australian politician, MP (1996–1998).
- Jenaro García-Arreciado, 77, Spanish engineer and politician, deputy (1982–1998).
- Cecília Gáspár, 39, Hungarian footballer (TSV Crailsheim, SGS Essen, national team).
- Mary-Pat Green, 72, American actress (Any Day Now, Fantastic Four, The Break-Up).
- James Earl Jones, 93, American actor (Star Wars, Fences, The Lion King), Tony winner (1969, 1987).
- Kuniaki Kobayashi, 68, Japanese professional wrestler (NJPW, NWA Hollywood, AJPW), pancreatic cancer.
- Robert Kościelny, 63, Polish engineer and politician, MP (1993–1997).
- Lee Hoi-sang, 83, Hong Kong actor (The 36th Chamber of Shaolin, The Incredible Kung Fu Master, Shaolin and Wu Tang) and martial artist.
- Anne-José Lemonnier, 66, French poet.
- Mohammad H. Mehrmand, 96, Iranian Imperial Air Force pilot.
- Minnie Mendoza, 89, Cuban-American baseball player (Minnesota Twins).
- Charlotte O'Brien, 12, Australian child, suicide.
- Xavier Oriach, 96, Spanish-French painter and engraver.
- Raja Petra Kamarudin, 73, Malaysian blogger (Malaysia Today).
- Jacek Rybicki, 65, Polish politician, MP (1997–2001).
- Friedrich Schorlemmer, 80, German theologian and activist (Peaceful Revolution).
- Robert Smoktunowicz, 62, Polish politician, senator (2001–2007).
- Karen Swassjan, 76, Armenian philosopher.
- Patricia Taylor, 95, Australian-born Canadian microbiologist.
- Jeffrey Titford, 90, British politician, MEP (1999–2009), cancer.
- Caterina Valente, 93, French-Italian singer ("Bongo Cha Cha Cha").
- Herbert S. White, 97, Austrian-born American librarian.
- Mitchell Wiggins, 64, American basketball player (Chicago Bulls, Houston Rockets, Philadelphia 76ers).
- Alexander Yevstifeyev, 66, Russian politician, senator (2002–2004) and head of Mari El (2017–2022).
- Yeshey Zimba, 73, Bhutanese politician, prime minister (2000-2001, 2004-2005).

=== 10 ===
- Brian Aldridge, 47, American politician, member of the Mississippi House of Representatives (2004–2016).
- Tina McElroy Ansa, 74, American novelist and journalist.
- Nub Beamer, 88, Canadian gridiron football player.
- Frankie Beverly, 77, American singer (Maze) and songwriter ("Before I Let Go", "Back in Stride").
- Clio Maria Bittoni, 89, Italian lawyer, companion of the president (2006–2015).
- Patrick Bolger, 76, Canadian Olympic wrestler (1968, 1972) and judoka.
- David Boutin, 71, American politician, member of the New Hampshire House of Representatives (1994–1998, 2008–2010) and Senate (2010–2016).
- Sir John Campbell, 90, Scottish farmer and businessman.
- Roberto Chale, 77, Peruvian football player (Universitario, national team) and manager (Universitario).
- Daddae, 60, English musician (Soul II Soul).
- Valarie D'Elia, 64, American travel writer, complications from amyotrophic lateral sclerosis.
- Michaela DePrince, 29, Sierra Leonean-American ballerina.
- Dusko Doder, 87, American journalist (The Washington Post), Lewy body dementia.
- Arthur Edghill, 98, American jazz drummer.
- Ernesto Franco, 68, Italian academic and writer.
- Karl Gouder, 45, Maltese politician, MP (2010–2013, 2015–2022).
- Richard Hickmet, 76, British politician, MP (1983–1987).
- Doug Hood, 70, New Zealand record producer ("Pink Frost", Boodle Boodle Boodle), cancer.
- Billy Klapper, 87, American spur and bit maker.
- Kong Xianjing, 72, Chinese engineer and academic administrator, vice president of DLUT (1999–2002) and member of the Chinese Academy of Engineering.
- Chungdak Koren, 74, Tibetan nurse and politician, member of the Parliament of the Central Tibetan Administration (2011–2014).
- Robert F. Landel, 98, American physical chemist.
- Kevin Long, 69, American football player (South Carolina Gamecocks, New York Jets, Arizona Wranglers).
- Francisco Lopera, 73, Colombian neurologist.
- Serge Lourie, 78, British politician.
- Abbas Mahfouzi, 96, Iranian Twelver Shi'a marja'.
- Eligio Martínez, 69, Bolivian footballer (The Strongest, national team).
- László Mészáros, 47, Hungarian footballer (Fortuna Sittard). (death announced on this date)
- Maria Politseymako, 86, Russian actress (Success, 100 Days Before the Command, The Parrot Speaking Yiddish).
- Pari Saberi, 92, Iranian theatre director.
- Jim Sasser, 87, American politician, member of the U.S. Senate (1977–1995), ambassador to China (1996–1999).
- William F. Stanton, 101, American politician, member of the California State Assembly (1963–1967).
- Martin Vernon, 73, English cricketer (Middlesex, Gloucestershire).
- Kazu Yuzuki, 69–70, Japanese manga artist (Garo).

=== 11 ===
- Gabriel Adekunle Aromolaran, 86, Nigerian traditional ruler, Owa Obokun of Ijesha (since 1982).
- Senaka Batagoda, 66, Sri Lankan singer.
- James S. Clegg, 91, American biochemist.
- Kenneth Cope, 93, English actor (Randall and Hopkirk (Deceased), Coronation Street, The Damned).
- Jann Darlyn, 95, American actress (The Ten Commandments, Perry Mason, The Garment Jungle) and model.
- Elaine DePrince, 77, American author and activist, complications from surgery.
- Alberto Fujimori, 86, Peruvian politician and convicted criminal, president (1990–2000), tongue cancer.
- Ehab Galal, 57, Egyptian football player (Ismaily) and manager (ENPPI, Zamalek), stroke.
- Luca Giurato, 84, Italian journalist and television presenter (Domenica in, Unomattina), heart attack.
- Steve Gregg, 68, American swimmer, Olympic silver medalist (1976).
- Josef Helbling, 89, Swiss Olympic cyclist (1960).
- Jeong Jae-mun, 87, South Korean political scientist and politician, MP (1985–2004).
- Peter Klashorst, 67, Dutch painter, sculptor, and photographer, lymphoma.
- Galius Kličius, 74, Lithuanian painter, cinematographer, and theatrical designer.
- Nigel Lambert, 80, English voice actor (Look Around You, Wizard101, Doctor Who).
- Aussie Malcolm, 83, Australian-born New Zealand politician, MP (1975–1984), minister of immigration (1981–1984) and health (1981–1984).
- Ibsen Martínez, 72, Venezuelan journalist (El Nacional, El Nuevo Herald) and screenwriter (Por Estas Calles), heart attack.
- Chad McQueen, 63, American actor (The Karate Kid, Martial Law, Red Line) and racing driver, organ failure.
- Jean-Henri Meunier, 74, French film director and screenwriter.
- Frank Misson, 85, Australian cricketer (New South Wales, national team).
- Karl Moline, 51, American comic book artist (Fray, Route 666, Loners).
- James H. Moor, 82, American ethicist and moral philosopher.
- Didier Roustan, 66, French sports journalist (Téléfoot), liver cancer.
- Joe Schmidt, 92, American Hall of Fame football player and coach (Detroit Lions).
- Myron Stankiewicz, 88, Canadian ice hockey player (St. Louis Blues, Philadelphia Flyers).
- Daniel Starr, 90, American college athletics administrator.
- Nikolai Svanidze, 69, Russian television and radio host, brain ischemia.
- Malick Touré, 28, Malian footballer (Club Africain, US Biskra, MO Béjaïa), heart attack.
- Illia Yefimchyk, 36, Belarusian bodybuilder, cardiac arrest.

=== 12 ===
- Julius Ansah, 74, Ghanaian jurist, justice of the Supreme Court (2004–2020).
- Stan Asofsky, 87, American aficionado, book club administrator and tennis facility manager.
- Jean Beaufils, 88, French politician, deputy (1981–1993),
- Safeya Binzagr, 84, Saudi painter and museum owner.
- Chen Xianhua, 87, Chinese lieutenant general.
- Santi Coch, 64, Spanish football player (Gimnàstic) and manager (Pobla Mafumet).
- Harry W. Crosby, 98, American historian and photographer.
- Per-Olof Ericsson, 86, Swedish Olympic swimmer (1960).
- Joseph G. Gall, 96, American biologist.
- John Haglelgam, 75, Micronesian politician, president (1987–1991).
- Hank, 12–13, American sports mascot dog (Milwaukee Brewers).
- Greg Harden, 75, American life coach and motivational speaker, complications from surgery.
- Reinhard Hartmann, 86, Austrian-born English lexicographer and applied linguist.
- María Daniela Icaza, 35, Ecuadorian prison director (Litoral Penitentiary), shot.
- Elisabeth Kværne, 71, Norwegian langeleik player.
- Wasyl Medwit, 75, Polish-born Ukrainian Greek Catholic hierarch, auxiliary bishop of Lviv (1994–1996) and Donetsk-Kharkiv (2009–2013).
- Charles W. Moore, 84, American football player (Tennessee State Tigers) and coach (Bethune–Cookman Wildcats, Langston University).
- Frank Oberle Sr., 92, German-born Canadian politician, MP (1972–1993) and minister of forestry (1990–1993).
- Papa Kojak, 68, Jamaican musician.
- Stephen Peat, 44, Canadian ice hockey player (Washington Capitals), injuries sustained in traffic collision.
- Avelino Porto, 88, Argentine lawyer, minister of health (1991) and founder of the University of Belgrano.
- Guy Robinson, 85, American racing driver.
- Laine Tarvis, 86, Estonian politician.
- Micah Taylor, 47, American professional wrestler.
- LeRoy S. Wirthlin, 90, American surgeon.
- Sitaram Yechury, 72, Indian politician, MP (2005–2017), pneumonia.
- Rolf Zachariassen, 89, Finnish Olympic sailor (1960).

=== 13 ===
- Franca Bettoia, 88, Italian actress (A Man of Straw, The Last Man on Earth, Sandokan Against the Leopard of Sarawak).
- Moisés Canelo, 74, Honduran singer-songwriter, stroke.
- Tommy Cash, 84, American musician ("Six White Horses").
- Ben Fairbrother, 51, Canadian football player (Saskatchewan Roughriders, BC Lions), traffic collision.
- Wolfgang Gerhardt, 80, German politician, MP (1994–2013).
- Pravin Gordhan, 75, South African politician and anti-apartheid activist, minister of public enterprises (2018–2024) and finance (2009–2014, 2015–2017), twice MNA, cancer.
- Svanfríður Guðjónsdóttir, 83, Icelandic footballer.
- Harold D. Guither, 97, American agricultural economist and writer.
- Victor Halberstadt, 85, Dutch economist and academic.
- Joseph Haruna Duza, 61, Nigerian politician, member of the Niger State House of Assembly.
- J. Gorman Houston Jr., 91, American judge, justice of the Supreme Court of Alabama (1985–2005).
- Anja Jantschik, 55, German journalist and writer.
- Zbigniew Lew-Starowicz, 80, Polish psychiatrist and psychotherapist.
- Lex Marinos, 75, Australian actor (Kingswood Country) and radio presenter (Triple J).
- George Mason, 94, New Zealand botanist, chemist, and philanthropist.
- Christa C. Mayer Thurman, 89, German and American curator, art historian, author, and scholar
- Mary McFadden, 85, American designer, myelodysplasia.
- Kevin Miles, 95, Australian actor (Carson's Law, Dynasty).
- Chalong Pakdeevijit, 93, Thai film director and actor, pulmonary edema.
- Mark Podwal, 79, American artist, author, and filmmaker, cancer.
- Jan Popczyk, 78, Polish electrical engineer.
- Sir George Radda, 88, Hungarian-British chemist, chief executive of MRC (1996–2004).
- Nicola Rotolo, 99, Italian politician, president of Apulia (1975–1978).
- Ruth Schumann Antelme, 98–99, French academic and Egyptologist.
- Edward James Slattery, 84, American Roman Catholic prelate, bishop of Tulsa (1993–2016).
- Itsuo Sonobe, 95, Japanese lawyer and judge, justice of the Supreme Court (1989–1999).
- Kristinn Stefánsson, 79, Icelandic basketball player (KR).
- Milda Vainiutė, 61, Lithuanian legal scholar and politician, minister of justice (2016–2018).
- Lois Wilson, 97, Canadian politician and academic administrator, senator (1998–2002), chancellor of Lakehead University (1990–2000).
- Xu Yong, 65, Chinese military officer and politician, member of the National People's Congress (2013–2018).

=== 14 ===
- Berit Ås, 96, Norwegian politician, MP (1973–1977).
- Regina Becker-Schmidt, 87, German psychologist and sociologist.
- Walter Birtles, 87, Canadian Olympic basketball player (1964).
- Toshen Bora, 74, Indian footballer (national team).
- Joe Comfort, 70, American homeless advocate.
- Otis Davis, 92, American sprinter, Olympic champion (1960).
- Jean-Michel Dupuis, 69, French actor (Little Marcel, Dossier 51, La Boum).
- Brenda Fajardo, 84, Filipino artist and printmaker.
- Sadreddin Hejazi, 76, Iranian actor (The Gun Loaded, Santouri, Doubt).
- Fred Nall Hollis, 76, American visual artist.
- Zubair Khan, 61, Indian politician, Rajasthan MLA (1990–1998, 2003–2008, since 2023).
- James Magee, 79, American visual artist, colon and prostate cancer.
- Kamel Ouejdide, 44, French-Moroccan footballer (Sète 34, Clermont, Boussu Dour Borinage).
- Fernando Puche, 78, Spanish businessman, president of Málaga CF (1997–2001).
- Charles Riggins, 64, American football player (Tampa Bay Buccaneers).
- Jaber Al-Mubarak Al-Hamad Al-Sabah, 82, Kuwaiti royal, prime minister (2011–2019) and minister of defense (2001–2011).
- Richard Allen Thompson, 90, American politician, member of the Indiana House of Representatives (1979–1984) and Senate (1984–1996).
- Andrzej Zieliński, 89, Polish engineer and politician, minister of communication (1993–1997).

=== 15 ===
- Aleksandr Baryshnikov, 75, Russian shotputter, Olympic bronze (1976) and silver (1980) medalist.
- Richard G. Candelaria, 102, American World War II flying ace.
- Harry Chappas, 66, American baseball player (Chicago White Sox).
- Cho Gyeong-mok, 87, South Korean politician, MP (1985–1992).
- W. J. Michael Cody, 88, American attorney, complications from Parkinson's disease.
- David Davis, 63, American bluegrass musician, traffic collision.
- Jack Fagan, 85, Irish Gaelic footballer (Meath) and journalist (Irish Times).
- Geoffrey Hinsliff, 86, English actor (Coronation Street, Brass, Doctor Who).
- Kenny Hyslop, 73, Scottish drummer (Slik, Zones, Simple Minds), prostate cancer.
- Jack D. Ives, 92, British-born Canadian montologist.
- Tito Jackson, 70, American Hall of Fame musician (The Jackson 5), heart attack.
- Elias Khoury, 76, Lebanese novelist and public intellectual.
- Basil H. Losten, 94, American Ukrainian Greek Catholic hierarch, auxiliary bishop of Philadelphia (1971–1977) and bishop of Stamford (1977–2006).
- Roli Mosimann, 68, Swiss-born American musician (Swans) and record producer (Mind Bomb, Album of the Year), lung cancer.
- Sello Motloung, 54, South African actor (Gangster's Paradise: Jerusalema, Matatiele, Blood Psalms).
- Gheorghe Mulțescu, 72, Romanian football player (Jiul Petroșani, national team) and manager (Dinamo București).
- Nam Jae-hui, 90, South Korean politician, MP (1979–1992), minister of labor (1993–1994).
- Miye Ota, 106, American ballroom dancer and businesswoman.
- Brian Richardson, 77, Australian Olympic rower (1976, 1980).
- Valentin Samungi, 82, Romanian handballer, Olympic bronze medallist (1972).
- Karin Sundbye, 96, Norwegian textile artist.
- Malcolm Mitchell-Thomson, 3rd Baron Selsdon, 86, British peer, banker and businessman, member of the House of Lords (1963–2021).
- Justin Yoder, 37, American soapbox racer, injuries sustained in traffic collision.

=== 16 ===
- Norman Ackroyd, 86, English visual artist.
- Yuko Arakida, 70, Japanese volleyball player, Olympic champion (1976).
- Gloria Bornstein, 87, American artist.
- Paul-André Cadieux, 77, Canadian ice hockey player (SC Bern, HC Davos, EHC Chur).
- Daniel Cordier, 82, French footballer (Union Sportive de Valenciennes Anzin, Troyes).
- Robert Dill-Bundi, 65, Swiss racing cyclist, Olympic champion (1980).
- Mir Sarfraz Chakar Domki, 55, Pakistani politician, Balochistan MPA (since 2013).
- Dame Elizabeth Esteve-Coll, 85, British academic and museum director.
- Tyrone C. Fahner, 81, American lawyer and politician, Illinois attorney general (1980–1983).
- Pascal Flynn, 86–87, Irish Gaelic footballer (St. Mary's, Dublin).
- Don Gibson, 95, English footballer (Manchester United, Sheffield Wednesday, Leyton Orient).
- Harrison J. Goldin, 88, American politician, member of the New York State Senate (1966–1973), New York City comptroller (1974–1989).
- Peter Green, 99, British historian.
- Steve Hardwick, 68, English footballer (Oxford United, Huddersfield Town, Newcastle United).
- Eikoh Hosoe, 91, Japanese photographer and filmmaker, adrenal gland tumor
- Anwar Jassam, 77, Iraqi football manager (Al-Zawraa, Al-Naft, national team).
- István Juhász, 79, Hungarian footballer (Ferencvárosi TC, national team), Olympic champion (1968).
- Dick Kimber, 84–85, Australian historian and author.
- Robert Lansdorp, 85, American tennis coach.
- Barbara Leigh-Hunt, 88, English actress (Frenzy, Henry VIII and His Six Wives, Bequest to the Nation).
- William P. Malm, 96, American musicologist.
- Curtis McCormack, 72, American politician, member of the Vermont House of Representatives (1983–1996, 2013–2022), cancer.
- Steve Oelrich, 78, American politician and law enforcement officer, member of the Florida Senate (2006–2012).
- Barbara C. Pringle, 85, American politician, member of the Ohio House of Representatives (1982–2000).
- Roy Reiman, 90, American philanthropist and publicist, founder of Reiman Publications.
- Chris Serle, 81, British television presenter (That's Life!), stroke.
- Gary Shaw, 63, English footballer (Aston Villa, Kjøbenhavns Boldklub, Shrewsbury Town), complications from a fall.
- Song Binbin, 77, Chinese Red Guard leader, cancer.
- Billy Edd Wheeler, 91, American singer and songwriter ("Jackson", "It's Midnight", "Coward of the County").
- Tony Whitford, 83, Canadian politician, commissioner of the Northwest Territories (2005–2010).

=== 17 ===
- Ebenezer Kwadwo Teye Addo, Ghanaian politician, Central Regional Minister (2013).
- Evin Agassi, 78, Iranian-born American Assyrian singer, glioblastoma.
- Ahmad Mohd Don, 77, Malaysian banker, governor of the Central Bank (1994–1998).
- Taimuraz Batagov, 84, Russian military officer, lawyer, and politician, deputy (1990–1993).
- Werner Bernreuther, 82, German actor, musician and writer.
- César, 68, Brazilian footballer (America, Benfica, Grêmio).
- Herman Chinery-Hesse, 60, Ghanaian software company executive, cardiac arrest.
- Joseph Ciechanover, 90, Israeli civil servant.
- Gene Cronin, 90, American football player (Detroit Lions, Washington Redskins, Dallas Cowboys).
- Jim Cullivan, 103, American football coach (Murray State Racers).
- Magda De Galan, 77, Belgian politician.
- Nelson DeMille, 81, American novelist (The General's Daughter, Plum Island, The Charm School), esophageal cancer.
- Priscilla Dunn, 80, American politician, member of the Alabama House of Representatives (1998–2009) and Senate (2009–2022).
- Jimmy Giménez-Arnau, 81, Spanish journalist, author and television personality.
- Tony Haynes, 83, English composer and bandleader (Grand Union Orchestra).
- Paul Imiéla, 81, French footballer (Amiens, France Amateurs).
- Chris Jones, 84, English rock climber and writer.
- Neil King Jr., 65, American journalist and author, complications from esophageal cancer.
- Renu C. Laskar, 92, Indian-born American mathematician.
- Juozas Lebednykas, 77, Lithuanian artist and sculptor.
- Beppe Menegatti, 95, Italian theatre director.
- Mohamed Mahmoud Ould Mohamedou, 56, Mauritanian diplomat, minister of foreign affairs (2008–2009).
- Venkatreddy Mudnal, 71, Indian politician, Karnataka MLA (2018–2023).
- José Patriota, 63, Brazilian social worker and politician, Pernambuco MLA (since 2023), liver cancer.
- Beyene Petros, 74, Ethiopian politician, MP (2000–2005).
- Jean Roberts, 81, Australian Olympic discus thrower (1968).
- Hitler Saavedra, 46, Peruvian surgeon and politician, MP (since 2021).
- C. I. D. Sakunthala, 84, Indian actress (Thavapudhalavan, Agathiyar, Idhaya Veenai).
- JD Souther, 78, American Hall of Fame singer-songwriter ("You're Only Lonely", "Her Town Too", "New Kid in Town").
- Donnell Thompson, 65, American football player (Baltimore/Indianapolis Colts).
- Peter Tiboris, 76, American conductor.

=== 18 ===
- Kesaria Abramidze, 37, Georgian model (Miss Trans Global) and influencer, stabbed.
- Pierre Alonzo, 84, French football player (Red Star, Cannes) and manager (Paris Saint-Germain).
- Gerti Bogdani, 44, Albanian politician, MP (2009–2017), cardiac arrest.
- Ursel Brunner, 83, German swimmer, Olympic bronze medalist (1960).
- Luigi Bulleri, 90, Italian politician, mayor of Pisa (1976–1983), deputy (1983–1992).
- Keith Curran, 68, American playwright and actor.
- Dick Diamonde, 76, Dutch-born Australian bassist (The Easybeats).
- G. M. Keith Dow, 87, Canadian politician, New Brunswick MLA (1982–1987).
- Nick Gravenites, 85, American blues musician (The Electric Flag, Big Brother and the Holding Company) and record producer ("One Toke Over the Line"), complications from dementia and diabetes.
- Anton Hofherr, 76, German Olympic ice hockey player (1972).
- Tofazzal Hossain, 35, Bangladeshi student, beaten.
- Jason Joynes, 54, Australian basketball player (Westside Saints, Newcastle Falcons, Geelong Supercats), cancer.
- Zulya Kamalova, 55, Russian-born Australian singer, cancer.
- Zbigniew Kociołek, 79, Polish football manager (Stoczniowiec Gdańsk, Lechia Gdańsk, Wisła Płock).
- Shahnawaz Kumbhar, Pakistani doctor, shot.
- Ella Leffland, 92, American novelist and short story writer.
- Annick Le Thomas, 88, French botanist.
- Sam Malcolmson, 77, Scottish-born New Zealand footballer (Queen of the South, Albion Rovers, national team).
- Ken Melville, 93, Australian rules footballer (Melbourne).
- Gerald L. Miller, 82, American brigadier general.
- Christian-Marie Monnot, 78, French journalist (France 2).
- Pat Pimm, 67, Canadian politician, British Columbia MLA (2009–2017).
- Temario Rivera, 77, Filipino political scientist, pancreatic cancer.
- Salvatore Schillaci, 59, Italian footballer (Juventus, Inter Milan, national team), colon cancer.
- Sir Patrick Sergeant, 100, British journalist (Daily Mail), investor and businessman, founder of Euromoney Institutional Investor.
- Tony Soper, 95, British ornithologist and television presenter (Animal Magic).
- Sehat Sutardja, 63, Indonesian-born American technology industry executive, co-founder of Marvell Technology Group.
- Michel Think, 64, Luxembourgian Olympic sport shooter (1992).
- André Vadon, 90, French rugby league player (Cavaillon, Albi, national team).
- Wojciech Wala, 59, Polish Olympic wrestler (1988).
- Stephan Wittwer, 71, Swiss experimental musician and composer.
- Rolf Wolfshohl, 85, German racing cyclist, 1965 Vuelta a España winner.
- Jerzy Wuttke, 79, Polish visual artist and politician, MP (1989–1991, 1993–1997).

=== 19 ===
- Ralph Abraham, 88, American mathematician.
- Jay J. Armes, 92, American private investigator and politician.
- Jack Belrose, 97, Canadian radio scientist.
- Florent Caers, 95, Belgian Olympic rower.
- María Díaz Cañete, 40, Spanish politician, member of the Andalusian parliament (since 2023), cancer.
- Amélia Hruschka, 91, Brazilian lawyer and politician, Paraná MLA (1983–1991).
- Burrell Ives Humphreys, 97, American judge.
- Bimal Kar, 87, Bangladeshi footballer (Shadhin Bangla).
- Timmy Kwebulana, 83, South African actor.
- Gail Letzter, 64, American mathematician.
- Bobby Lewis, 78, American basketball player (South Carolina State, Wilmington Bombers) and coach (Haverford College).
- Jack Limpert, 90, American journalist (Washingtonian).
- Daniel McMahon, 41, American musician, producer and audio engineer, esophageal cancer.
- Kevin Mullins, 54, American judge, shot.
- Tongsun Park, 89, South Korean lobbyist.
- Fabiola Posada, 61, Colombian humorist, member of the Bogotá City Council (2002–2005).
- Ivan Ramos, 58, Belizean politician, member of the Belize House of Representatives (2012–2015).
- Victoria Roshchyna, 27, Ukrainian journalist.
- Bruno Sacco, 90, Italian-German automobile designer.
- Ernesto Sánchez, 76, Venezuelan Olympic boxer.
- Marvin Schlachter, 90, American music executive, founder of Prelude Records, intestinal cancer.
- Keith Somerville, 67, British journalist and author.
- Pierre Vilars, 108, French military officer.
- Kari Vogt, 85, Norwegian religious historian.
- Florence Warner, 77, American singer.
- Jonathan Wells, 82, American pseudoscientific biologist (Icons of Evolution).
- Eduardo Xol, 58, American television personality (Extreme Makeover: Home Edition), designer and entertainer, stabbed.

=== 20 ===
- Valentinas Antanavičius, 88, Lithuanian painter.
- Ibrahim Aqil, 61–62, Lebanese airforce leader (Redwan Force), airstrike.
- Józef Bachórz, 90, Polish philologist.
- Victor Barnett, 91, British-American businessman.
- Michael A. Brown, 74, Canadian politician, Ontario MPP (1987–2011).
- Kathryn Crosby, 90, American actress (The 7th Voyage of Sinbad, Anatomy of a Murder, Operation Mad Ball) and singer.
- William W. Crouch, 83, American general.
- Richard Dyer, 82, American music critic (The Boston Globe).
- Eddin Syazlee Shith, 50, Malaysian politician, MP (2018–2022).
- Daniel J. Evans, 98, American politician, governor of Washington (1965–1977), member of the U.S. Senate (1983–1989) and Washington House of Representatives (1957–1965).
- Herbert Foerstel, 90, American librarian and author.
- Artashes Geghamyan, 74, Armenian politician, mayor of Yerevan (1989–1990).
- David Graham, 99, British actor (Thunderbirds, Doctor Who, Peppa Pig).
- Barbara Horawianka, 94, Polish actress (Passenger, Maria and Napoleon, Colonel Kwiatkowski).
- Srirangam Kannan, 72, Indian musician.
- Arthur Karlin, 88, American biochemist.
- Jack Kessler, 79, American hazzan and musician.
- Pavel Klener, 87, Czech oncologist and politician, member of the Czech National Council (1990–1992) and minister of health (1989–1990).
- Philippine Le Noir de Carlan, 19, French woman, asphyxiated. (body discovered on this date)
- Daniel López Romo, 79, Puerto Rican lawyer, U.S. attorney for Puerto Rico (1982–1993).
- Greg Malouf, 64, Australian chef. (death announced on this date)
- Yan Morvan, 70, French photographer, skin cancer.
- Nguyễn Đình Đầu, 104, Vietnamese historian.
- Victor D. Norman, 78, Norwegian economist, minister of labour (2001–2004), cancer.
- Darrell Opfer, 83, American politician, member of the Ohio House of Representatives (1993–1999).
- Freddie Eugene Owens, 46, American convicted murderer, execution by lethal injection.
- Velayudhan Panikkassery, 94, Indian historian.
- Kaviyoor Ponnamma, 79, Indian actress (Kalippattam, Nandanam, Kudumbasametham).
- Simone Prouvé, 92, French textile artist.
- Kim Richmond, 84, American jazz saxophonist and composer, bladder cancer.
- Sayuri, 28, Japanese singer-songwriter ("Sore wa Chiisana Hikari no Youna", "Furaregai Girl", "Parallel Line").
- George K. Schweitzer, 99, American chemist.
- Robert Spence, 91, British engineer.
- Jon Svendsen, 70, American water polo player, Olympic silver medallist (1984).
- Cleo Sylvestre, 79, British actress (Crossroads, Paddington, All Creatures Great and Small).
- Ron Warren, 95, Australian rules footballer (Geelong).
- Randy West, 76, American pornographic actor, heart and kidney failure.
- Olle Zetterquist, 97, Swedish artist and violinist.
- Radmila Živković, 71, Serbian actress (Variola Vera, The Meeting Point, Kuduz).

=== 21 ===
- Brian Bermingham, 77, Irish politician, lord mayor of Cork (2008–2009).
- Barbara Metselaar Berthold, 72–73, German photographer and filmmaker.
- Raquel Blandón, 81, Guatemalan politician and lawyer, first lady (1986–1991), sepsis.
- Jacques de Groote, 97, Belgian economist.
- Albert Fogarty, 84, Canadian politician, Prince Edward Island MLA (1979–1993).
- Zahir Al Ghafri, 68, Omani poet.
- Benny Golson, 95, American jazz saxophonist and composer ("I Remember Clifford", "Stablemates", "Whisper Not").
- Bernard Gross, 89, American politician, member of the Pennsylvania House of Representatives (1967–1971).
- Donna Henes, 79, American artist and urban shaman.
- Akiko Kumai, 84, Japanese writer and researcher, heart failure.
- M. M. Lawrence, 95, Indian politician, MP (1980–1984).
- Eddie Low, 81, New Zealand musician, cancer.
- David Garrard Lowe, 91, American historian and author.
- James Maness, 61, American football player (Chicago Bears), early onset Alzheimer’s and dementia.
- Paola Marella, 61, Italian architect and television presenter, cancer.
- Al McCoy, 91, American sportscaster (Phoenix Suns).
- Rocky Moran, 74, American racing driver (IMSA, CART), cancer.
- Mercury Morris, 77, American football player (Miami Dolphins, San Diego Chargers), Super Bowl champion (1972, 1973).
- Dick Moss, 93, American labor lawyer.
- Manolis Papastefanakis, 84, Greek lawyer and politician, MP (1981–1990, 1993–1996), minister of the interior (1987).
- Ren Jianxin, 99, Chinese jurist and politician, president of the Supreme People's Court (1988–1998) and vice chairperson of the CPPCC (1998–2003).
- Juan Carlos Salazar, 59, Venezuelan singer and cuatro player.
- Evgeniy Sapiro, 90, Russian economist and politician, minister of regional development (1998).
- Reza Saraj, 59, Iranian politician.
- Tom Spanbauer, 78, American author (The Man Who Fell in Love with the Moon), heart failure.
- Melvin L. Stukes, 76, American politician, member of the Maryland House of Delegates (2007–2015) and Baltimore City Council (1991–2004).
- Mário Genival Tourinho, 91, Brazilian politician, deputy (1975–1983).

=== 22 ===
- Walter Bainbridge, 94, American figure skater.
- Michael Braasch, 58, American scientist, pancreatic cancer.
- Fania Brancovskaja, 102, Lithuanian teacher, librarian and statistician.
- Ralph Cann, 89, English footballer (Mansfield Town).
- Roy Clay, 95, American computer scientist.
- Max Cresswell, 84, New Zealand philosopher.
- Bill Dorland, 58, American plasma physicist, complications from chordoma.
- Andrzej Głownia, 72, Polish footballer (Lechia Gdańsk, Arka Gdynia).
- José Grande, 79, Spanish racing cyclist.
- Brian Huggett, 87, Welsh golfer.
- Fredric Jameson, 90, American philosopher (Postmodernism, or, the Cultural Logic of Late Capitalism, The Political Unconscious).
- Peter Jay, 87, British journalist and diplomat, ambassador to the United States (1977–1979).
- W. Jayasiri, 77, Sri Lankan actor (Seilama, Visidela, Sudu Kaluwara).
- Jouko Jokinen, 87, Finnish Olympic speed skater (1960, 1964).
- Hilary King, 92–93, Welsh bowler. (death announced on this date)
- Hanif Kureshi, 41, Indian artist and designer, lung cancer.
- Enid MacRobbie, 92, Scottish plant scientist.
- Lucienne Malovry, 93, French politician, senator (2004–2011), mayor of Cormeilles-en-Parisis (1995–2008).
- Ján Michalko, 76, Slovak Olympic cross-country skier (1972, 1976).
- Akkaphan Namart, 39, Thai actor (Sapai Glai Peun Tiang, Satja Nai Chum Joan), heart cancer.
- Viktor Nozdrin, 72, Russian football player (Lokomotiv Moscow) and manager (Nara-ShBFR Naro-Fominsk, Sakhalin Yuzhno-Sakhalinsk).
- Roger Palm, 75, Swedish drummer (ABBA).
- Park Hee-bu, 85, South Korean civil servant and politician, MP (1992–1996).
- Alexander G. Petrov, 76, Bulgarian physicist, member of the Bulgarian Academy of Sciences.
- Hugh Prestwood, 82, American singer-songwriter, stroke.
- Mahbubur Rahman, 70, Bangladeshi politician, state minister of water resources (2009–2014) and MP (2001–2018).
- Koos van der Merwe, 87, South African politician, MP (1977–2014).
- Ivan Vukadinov, 92, Bulgarian visual artist. (death announced on this date)

=== 23 ===
- Tord Andersson, 82, Swedish Olympic diver (1968).
- Robert Aymar, 88, French physicist, director general of CERN (2004–2008).
- Mary Beasley, 91, Australian public servant.
- Frances Butler, 83, American artist and academic.
- Vajira Chitrasena, 92, Sri Lankan choreographer. (death announced on this date)
- Giancarlo Crosta, 90, Italian rower, Olympic silver medallist (1960).
- David Curson, 75, American politician, member of the U.S. House of Representatives (2012–2013).
- Mike Elliott, 82, American Olympic cross-country skier (1964, 1968, 1972).
- Fernand Fox, 90, Luxembourgish actor.
- A. D. Frazier, 80, American business executive.
- Tomris Giritlioğlu, 67, Turkish film director (Mrs. Salkım's Diamonds, Pains of Autumn) and producer, cancer.
- Murray Greenfield, 98, American-born Israeli writer, co-founder of the Gefen Publishing House.
- Henri Guimbard, 86, French racing cyclist, traffic collision.
- Anwar Hussein, 85, Tanganyikan-born British photojournalist and author.
- Rupert Keegan, 69, English racing driver (Formula One, CART).
- Hadelin de La Tour du Pin, 73, French diplomat.
- Norbert Lohfink, 96, German Roman Catholic priest and theologian (Sankt Georgen Graduate School of Philosophy and Theology).
- Osmar Milito, 83, Brazilian pianist and composer.
- Steve Moore, 65, American racing driver.
- Sebastião Nery, 92, Brazilian journalist.
- Asım Pars, 48, Bosnian-Turkish basketball player (Galatasaray, KK Zagreb, Turkey national team).
- Thadée Polak, 92, French footballer (Sedan, Lyon).
- Gary Reineke, 84, American-Canadian actor (The Grey Fox, Street Legal, Iron Eagle II).
- Igor Štuhec, 91, Slovenian composer. (death announced on this date)
- Nereo Svara, 89, Italian Olympic hurdler (1960).
- Paul Swanson, 92, American bridge player.
- Maxime Tandonnet, 65, French civil servant and writer.
- Don Van Etten, 90, American politician, member of the South Dakota House of Representatives (2001–2008).
- Alan Vera, 33, Cuban-American Greco-Roman wrestler, heart attack.

=== 24 ===
- Doug Bird, 74, American baseball player (Kansas City Royals, New York Yankees, Chicago Cubs).
- Ken Chant, 91, American Pentecostal pastor.
- James Cox, 82, British journalist and broadcaster, complications from multiple sclerosis.
- Francis Fox, 84, Canadian politician, solicitor general (1976–1978), secretary of state (1980–1981) and minister of communications (1980–1984).
- Roberto Frota, 85, Brazilian actor (Chiquititas, Sansão e Dalila, Mulheres Apaixonadas), pneumonia.
- Pierre-William Glenn, 80, French cinematographer (Day for Night) and film director.
- Cat Glover, 62, American choreographer and musician ("Alphabet St."), heart disease and chronic obstructive pulmonary disease.
- Vel Heckman, 88, American college football player (Florida Gators).
- Ken Howard, 84, English songwriter, lyricist and author.
- Dov Jaron, 88, American engineer.
- Amadou-Mahtar M'Bow, 103, Senegalese politician, director-general of UNESCO (1974–1987).
- Bill Moyes, 92, Australian hang gliding pioneer.
- Julián Muñoz, 76, Spanish politician and convicted criminal (Operation Malaya), mayor of Marbella (2002–2003), lung cancer.
- Walter Neumann, 78, British-American mathematician.
- Old Dry Keith, British petroleum engineer and TikTok celebrity, bone cancer. (death announced on this date)
- Tavana Salmon, 104, French Polynesian culture advocate.
- Giacinto Scoles, 89, Italian-American chemist and physicist.
- Michael Sladek, 77, German doctor and environmental activist.
- Sudjadi, 81, Indonesian politician, member of the House of Representatives (since 2009).
- Elio Tinti, 88, Italian Roman Catholic prelate, bishop of Carpi (2000–2011).

=== 25 ===
- Ismail Alieksandrovič, 95, Belarusian Islamic cleric.
- Piero Angelini, 88, Italian lawyer and politician, deputy (1983–1994).
- Noroviin Baatar, 88, Mongolian ballet dancer and film actor.
- John Baumgartner, 93, American baseball player (Detroit Tigers).
- Anders Bergman, 61, Swedish ice hockey player (Modo, Färjestad, national team), Olympic bronze medallist (1988).
- Gildas Bourdais, 85, French ufologist.
- Beniamino Brocca, 89, Italian schoolteacher and politician, deputy (1976–1992).
- Dick Caine, 78, Australian swimming coach and sex offender, lung and throat cancer.
- Joyce Clague, 86, Australian Aboriginal political activist.
- Marcus R. Clark, 68, American judge, associate justice of the Louisiana Supreme Court (2009–2020).
- José Miguel Espinosa, 78, Spanish Olympic swimmer (1964).
- June Frazer, 88, American politician, member of the New Hampshire House of Representatives (2010–2016).
- Haji Nurul Islam, 60, Indian politician, MP (2009–2014, since 2024) and West Bengal MLA (2016–2024).
- Asim Khan, 62, Pakistani-born Dutch cricketer (VRA Amsterdam, Netherlands national team). (death announced on this date)
- James Lavery, 95, Canadian Olympic sprinter.
- William Lucy, 90, American trade union leader, president of PSI (1994–2002).
- Roman Madyanov, 62, Russian actor (Hopelessly Lost, Private Detective, or Operation Cooperation, Leviathan), lung cancer.
- John Warwick Montgomery, 92, American-British-French Christian apologist and theologian.
- Sever Mureșan, 75, Romanian tennis player.
- Timur Osmolovskiy, 24, Russian footballer and soldier, drone strike.
- Magunta Parvathamma, 77, Indian politician, MP (1996–1998) and Andhra Pradesh MLA (2004–2009).
- Edwin L. Pittman, 89, American jurist and politician, Mississippi attorney general (1984–1988), justice (1989–2004) and chief justice (2001–2004) of the Supreme Court of Mississippi.
- Romeo Ricciuti, 93, Italian businessman and politician, president of Abruzzo (1977–1981), deputy (1983–1994).
- Lewis Sorley, 90, American intelligence analyst and military historian.
- Grzegorz Tuderek, 86, Polish engineer and politician, MP (1997, 2002–2005).
- Lewis Turco, 90, American poet and author.
- Suryakanta Vyas, 86, Indian politician, Rajasthan MLA (1990–1998, since 2003).

=== 26 ===
- John Ashton, 76, American actor (Beverly Hills Cop, Some Kind of Wonderful, Midnight Run), cancer.
- Sören Börjesson, 68, Swedish football player (Örgryte IS, Djurgården) and manager (Örgryte IS).
- Michel Carrega, 90, French trap shooter, Olympic silver medalist (1972).
- Keki N. Daruwalla, 87, Indian poet and short story writer, pneumonia.
- Armando Freitas Filho, 84, Brazilian poet.
- Pat Galloway, 67, American engineer.
- Gintaras Jasinskas, 56, Lithuanian Olympic biathlete (1992, 1994).
- Neelam Karwariya, 55, Indian politician, Uttar Pradesh MLA (2017–2022).
- Iosif Khriplovich, 87, Russian theoretical physicist.
- Stefan Landsberger, 68–69, Dutch Sinologist.
- Li Binghua, 81, Chinese politician.
- Louis Marquis, 95, Swiss Olympic racewalker.
- Richard Mayhew, 100, American painter, illustrator, and arts educator.
- Alan Eugene Miller, 59, American spree killer, execution by nitrogen hypoxia.
- Dan Morse, 89, American archaeologist.
- Denise O'Brien, 87, Australian Olympic fencer (1956).
- Alvin Pankhurst, 74, New Zealand artist.
- Reinaldo, 70, Brazilian footballer (Flamengo, América de Natal, ABC), heart attack.
- Penny Simmons, 85, Bermudian sailor, four-time Olympic competitor.
- Rizvi Suhayb, 54, Sri Lankan rugby sevens and rugby union player.
- Jeffrey P. Victory, 78, American judge, associate justice of the Louisiana Supreme Court (1995–2014).
- Joe Wolf, 59, American basketball player (Los Angeles Clippers, Denver Nuggets) and coach (Milwaukee Bucks).

=== 27 ===
- Abdul Gafur, 95, Bangladeshi Bengali language activist.
- Anthony Barill, 90, American politician, member of the West Virginia House of Delegates (2010–2014).
- Munir Bhatti, Pakistani field hockey player (national team), cancer.
- Bindaree, 30, Irish racehorse. (death announced on this date)
- Jacobo Bucaram, 77, Ecuadorian agronomic engineer and politician, deputy (1988–1994, 1996–1998).
- Fabián Caballero, 46, Argentine-Paraguayan football player (Dundee, Club Nacional) and manager (Sportivo Ameliano), heart attack.
- Coritha, 73, Filipino folk singer.
- Clive Everton, 87, British billiards and snooker player, commentator, and journalist, founder of Snooker Scene.
- Fazile Hanımsultan, 83, Egyptian princess.
- Richard A. Fineberg, 83, American investigative journalist.
- Muriel Furrer, 18, Swiss road racing cyclist, race crash.
- Arina Glazunova, 24, Russian woman, fall.
- Joey Jay, 89, American baseball player (Milwaukee Braves, Cincinnati Reds, Atlanta Braves).
- Eduardo Jozami, 84, Argentine human rights activist, academic and political prisoner, deputy (1997–2000).
- John Little, 96, American academic (Massachusetts Institute of Technology).
- Czesław Litwin, 69, Polish farmer and politician, MP (2005–2007).
- John McNeil, 76, American jazz trumpeter.
- Pappammal, 109, Indian organic farmer.
- Keith Parker, 92, English long jumper.
- Pit Passarell, 56, Argentine-born Brazilian singer-songwriter and bassist (Viper), complications from pancreatic cancer.
- Kjeld Rimberg, 80, Norwegian business executive, CEO of Norwegian State Railways (1989–1990).
- Thomas Rockwell, 91, American author (How to Eat Fried Worms), complications from Parkinson's disease.
- Dame Maggie Smith, 89, British actress (The Prime of Miss Jean Brodie, Harry Potter, Downton Abbey), Oscar winner (1969, 1978).
- Kirby Sullivan, 97, American judge and politician, member of the North Carolina House of Representatives (1955–1957).
- Nathalia Urban, 36, Brazilian journalist and activist.
- Reijo Vähälä, 78, Finnish high jumper.
- Warren Griffin Wilson, 90, American journalist.
- Notable people killed in the Hezbollah headquarters strike:
  - Ali Karaki, 66–67, Lebanese militant, commander of the southern front of Hezbollah
  - Hassan Nasrallah, 64, Lebanese Shia cleric and politician, secretary-general of Hezbollah (since 1992)
  - Abbas Nilforoushan, 57–58, Iranian brigadier general

=== 28 ===
- Hugo Barrantes Ureña, 88, Costa Rican Roman Catholic prelate, bishop of Puntarenas (1998–2002) and archbishop of San José de Costa Rica (2002–2013).
- Warren Bickel, 68, American behavioral pharmacologist.
- John Burrell, 83, American football player (Pittsburgh Steelers, Washington Redskins, San Francisco 49ers).
- Choi Gwang-ryul, 88, South Korean lawyer and judge, justice of the constitutional court (1988–1994).
- Winfield Dunn, 97, American politician, governor of Tennessee (1971–1975).
- Johnny W. Floyd, 86, American politician, member of the Georgia House of Representatives (1989–2008).
- Bengt Frithiofsson, 85, Swedish wine writer (Svenska Dagbladet, Nyhetsmorgon).
- Drake Hogestyn, 70, American actor (Days of Our Lives, Seven Brides for Seven Brothers), pancreatic cancer.
- Serge Janquin, 81, French teacher and politician, mayor of Bruay-la-Buissière (1989–1999), deputy (1993–2017).
- Kris Kristofferson, 88, American Hall of Fame singer-songwriter ("Me and Bobby McGee", "Help Me Make It Through the Night") and actor (A Star Is Born), Grammy winner (1972, 1974, 1975).
- Barry Lloyd, 75, English footballer (Fulham, Chelsea) and manager (Yeovil Town).
- Jon Lufkin, 77, American Olympic cross-country skier.
- Glauco Mauri, 93, Italian actor (China Is Near, Deep Red, Ecce Bombo) and theatre director.
- Gladys McGarey, 103, American holistic physician and medical activist.
- Alexandre do Nascimento, 99, Angolan Roman Catholic cardinal, archbishop of Luanda (1986–2001) and Lubango (1977–1986), bishop of Malanje (1975–1977).
- Bobby Pate, 87, American football player and coach (West Georgia).
- Nabil Qaouk, 60, Lebanese Shia cleric and politician, deputy head of Hezbollah's executive council (since 2010), airstrike.
- Rodney J. Rogers, 59, American entrepreneur and expert technologist, cancer.
- Jacques Teugels, 78, Belgian footballer (R.W.D. Molenbeek, national team).
- Philip Thorn, 72, English cricketer (Gloucestershire).
- Larry Todd, 76, American cartoonist.
- Fereydoun Tonekaboni, 87, Iranian satirist and storyteller.
- Kumara Welgama, 74, Sri Lankan politician, MP (1994–2024) and minister of transport (2010–2015).
- Delia Zamudio, 81, Peruvian trade unionist, secretary general of the Confederación General de Trabajadores del Perú.

=== 29 ===
- Warren Benbow, 69, American drummer.
- Jostein Berntsen, 81, Norwegian politician, MP (1977–1989).
- Andrea Capone, 43, Italian footballer (Cagliari, Vicenza, Treviso), head injury.
- Kevin Darrigan, 92, Australian rules footballer (Fitzroy, Collingwood).
- Rohan de Saram, 85, British-born Sri Lankan cellist (Arditti Quartet).
- Ron Ely, 86, American actor (Tarzan, Doc Savage: The Man of Bronze, The Aquanauts).
- Doumbi Fakoly, 80, Malian writer.
- Richard S. Hamilton, 81, American mathematician (Ricci flow, Earle–Hamilton fixed-point theorem).
- Patrick Hobson, 91, British Anglican clergyman.
- Faina Kirillova, 93, Belarusian mathematician.
- Martin Lee, 77, English singer (Brotherhood of Man) and songwriter ("Save Your Kisses for Me", "Angelo"), heart failure.
- Heikki Mäkelä, 78, Finnish Olympic sprint canoeist (1968, 1972, 1976).
- Ed McLachlan, 84, English cartoonist and illustrator.
- Alton Meiring, 48, South African footballer (Cape Town Spurs, Manning Rangers, national team).
- Stoika Milanova, 79, Bulgarian violinist (1970 Carl Flesch International Violin Competition) and academic (National Academy of Music).
- Bismarck Myrick, 83, American diplomat, ambassador to Lesotho (1995–1998) and Liberia (1999–2002).
- Nobuyo Ōyama, 90, Japanese voice actress (Doraemon, Danganronpa, Invincible Super Man Zambot 3).
- Vimla Patil, Indian journalist and editor.
- Merrick Posnansky, 93, British archaeologist.
- Mostafizur Rahman, 70, Bangladeshi politician, MP (1991–2024) and minister of primary and mass education (2014–2019).
- Gordon Revel, 96, English footballer (Mansfield Town).
- Fatah Sharif, Palestinian militant (Hamas) and UNRWA officer, airstrike.
- Goran Simić, 72, Serbian-Canadian poet.
- Ozzie Virgil Sr., 92, Dominican baseball player (New York Giants, Detroit Tigers, Pittsburgh Pirates), pancreatitis.

=== 30 ===
- David Aradeon, 90, Nigerian-American architect.
- Hieronymus Herculanus Bumbun, 87, Indonesian Roman Catholic prelate, auxiliary bishop (1975–1977) and archbishop of Pontianak (1977–2014).
- Věra Černá, 61, Czech artistic gymnast.
- Naresh Churi, 60, Indian cricket player and coach (Railways).
- Gavin Creel, 48, American actor (Thoroughly Modern Millie, The Book of Mormon, Hello, Dolly!), Tony winner (2017), malignant peripheral nerve sheath tumor.
- Mike Dmitrich, 87, American politician, member of the Utah State Senate (1993–2009).
- Fayo, 46, Canadian singer-songwriter, cancer.
- Robert Fitzpatrick, 84, American art executive, president of the California Institute of the Arts (1975–1988).
- Keki Hormusji Gharda, 95, Indian chemical engineer, chemist and businessman.
- Feliu-Joan Guillaumes, 61, Spanish politician, deputy (1995–1996, 2011–2015, 2017–2019).
- Giel Haenen, 90, Dutch footballer (MVV Maastricht, Rapid JC, national team).
- Olavi Hirvonen, 93, American Olympic cross-country skier (1960).
- Markus Lyra, 79, Finnish diplomat, ambassador to Sweden (2010–2011).
- Ben Manilla, 71, American radio broadcaster, cancer.
- Danièle Mazet-Delpeuch, 82, French chef.
- Anatoli Melikhov, 81, Kazakh ice hockey coach (Barys Astana).
- Dikembe Mutombo, 58, Congolese-American Hall of Fame basketball player (Denver Nuggets, Houston Rockets, Atlanta Hawks), brain cancer.
- Peter Opsvik, 85, Norwegian industrial designer (Tripp Trapp).
- Humberto Ortega, 77, Nicaraguan revolutionary leader and military officer, commander-in-chief of the Army (1979–1995).
- Ken Page, 70, American actor (Ain't Misbehavin', Cats, The Nightmare Before Christmas).
- Park Ji-ah, 52, South Korean actress (Breath, Epitaph, Masquerade), ischemic stroke.
- Jacques Réda, 95, French poet and magazine editor (Nouvelle Revue Française).
- Catherine Riley, 77, American civil servant and politician, member of the Maryland House of Delegates (1975–1982) and Senate (1983–1990).
- Pete Rose, 83, American baseball player (Cincinnati Reds, Philadelphia Phillies, Montreal Expos) and manager, World Series champion (1975, 1976, 1980), heart disease.
- Ron Steens, 72, Dutch Olympic field hockey player (1976, 1984).
- Ron Thornton, 92, Australian rugby footballer (Canterbury-Bankstown).
- Dan Tichon, 87, Israeli politician, member (1981–1999) and speaker (1996–1999) of the Knesset.
- Adelio Tomasin, 94, Italian Roman Catholic prelate, bishop of Quixadá (1988–2007).
- Marko Valok, 97, Serbian football player (Partizan, Yugoslavia national team) and manager (Burma national team).
- Ana Velia Guzmán, 49, Mexican journalist, breast cancer.
- Robert Watts, 86, British film producer (Indiana Jones, Who Framed Roger Rabbit, An American Tail: Fievel Goes West).
