= Kevin Darrigan =

Australian rules footballer (1931–2024)

Personal information
- Full name: Kevin Lyle Darrigan
- Born: 15 October 1931
- Died: 29 September 2024 (aged 92)
- Original team: Preston Wanderers
- Height: 185 cm (6 ft 1 in)
- Weight: 76.5 kg (169 lb)

Playing career^{1}
Years	Club	Games (Goals)
1950–51	Collingwood	9 (0)
1953–56	Fitzroy	34 (6)
Total		43 (6)
- ^{1} Playing statistics correct to the end of 1956.

Kevin Darrigan (15 October 1931 – 29 September 2024) was an Australian rules footballer who played with Collingwood and Fitzroy in the Victorian Football League (VFL).
