= Bill Scrimshire =

American politician (1938–2024)

Member of the Arkansas House of Representatives from the 26th district
- In office January 13, 2003 – January 10, 2005
- Preceded by: Herschel W. Cleveland
- Succeeded by: Mike Burris

Member of the Arkansas House of Representatives from the 35th district
- In office January 11, 1999 – January 13, 2003
- Preceded by: Buddy Wallis
- Succeeded by: Jim Lendall

Personal details
- Born: January 16, 1938; Dyess, Arkansas
- Died: September 5, 2024 (aged 86); Malvern, Arkansas
- Political party: Democratic

Bill Scrimshire (January 16, 1938 – September 5, 2024) was an American politician who served in the Arkansas House of Representatives from 1999 to 2005.

He died on September 5, 2024, in Malvern, Arkansas at age 86.
