= Kazimierz Działocha =

Polish judge and politician (1932–2024)

Member of the Sejm
- In office 20 October 1997 – 18 October 2001

Member of the Senate of Poland
- In office 1995 – 20 October 1997
- Preceded by: Henryk Rot

Judge of the Constitutional Tribunal of Poland
- In office 1 December 1985 – 1 December 1993

Personal details
- Born: Kazimierz Jan Działocha; 29 January 1932 Wysocko Wielkie, Poland
- Died: 3 September 2024 (aged 92)
- Party: SLD
- Education: University of Wrocław
- Occupation: Lawyer; Judge

Kazimierz Jan Działocha (29 January 1932 – 3 September 2024) was a Polish lawyer, judge and politician. A member of the Democratic Left Alliance, he served as a judge of the Constitutional Tribunal from 1985 to 1993, was a member of the Senate from 1995 to 1997, and served in the Sejm from 1997 to 2001.

Działocha died on 3 September 2024, at the age of 92.
