= Zahir Al Ghafri =

Omani writer and poet (1956–2024)

- Born: 1956; Muscat and Oman
- Died: 21 September 2024 (aged 68)
- Occupations: Writer, poet

Zahir al-Ghafri (Arabic: زاهر الغافري; 1956 – 21 September 2024) was an Omani poet and writer. Al-Ghafri was affiliated with the University of Mohammed V, Rabat, department of philosophy and published 12 collections of poetry. Some of his work has been translated into Spanish, Chinese, and other languages. In 2008, he was awarded the Kika Poetry Prize for his poem "Stranger Between Two Rivers".

== Career ==
Al-Ghafri was a national poet, Omani Al-Manbit. Some of his work has been translated into Spanish, English, German, Swedish, Persian, Hindi, and Chinese. Some of his works include "Ignorant Poetry", "Pleasure and Benefit", and "Classical Poetry". He first traveled to Baghdad in 1968. In his travels, Al-Ghafri developed a worldly poetic style anchored by a consistent nostalgia for Oman. Al-Ghafri was the head of the Omani magazine Al-Burwaz, which is concerned with the visual arts. He is also reported to have had interests in vanguard cinema and the plastic arts.

== Death ==
Al Ghafri died on 21 September 2024, at the age of 68.

== Poetry ==
- (1983), White Shades: Paris
- (1991), silence comes to recognition: Cologne
- (1993), Isolation from Night: Muscat
- (2000), flowers in a well: Camel Publications House, Cologne
- (2006), Shades of Water Color: Range Printing, Publishing and Distribution House
- (2008), whenever an angel appears in the castle: Arab Proliferation Foundation
- (2013), five groups: Nineveh Study, Publishing and Distribution House
- (2017), One Life and Many Stairs: Publication and distribution endeavor
- (2018), in every well land you dream of the garden: Oman Press, Publishing and Distribution Foundation
- (2020), bedroom: Pilot Publishing Circuit

== Awards ==
Al Ghafri won the Kika Poetry Prize for his poem "Stranger Between Two Rivers" in 2008.
