= William E. Leber =

American politician (1932–2024)

Member of the New Hampshire House of Representatives from the Merrimack 1st district
- In office 1996–2002

Member of the New Hampshire House of Representatives from the Merrimack 35th district
- In office 2002–2004

Personal details
- Born: December 5, 1932 Cockeysville, Maryland, U.S.
- Died: September 1, 2024 (aged 91)
- Party: Republican
- Education: University of Omaha

William E. Leber (December 5, 1932 – September 1, 2024) was an American politician. He served as a Republican member for the Merrimack 1st and 35th district of the New Hampshire House of Representatives.

== Life and career ==
Leber was born in Cockeysville, Maryland, on December 5, 1932. He attended the University of Omaha.

Leber served in the New Hampshire House of Representatives from 1996 to 2004.

Leber died on September 1, 2024, at the age of 91.
