= Valarie D'Elia =

American travel journalist (1960–2024)

Valarie Ann D'Elia (January 20, 1960 – September 10, 2024) was an American travel writer and television host. She was the host of Travel with Val on NY1 from 1998 to 2017. Her work had appeared on the Travel Channel and HBO.
