= Xabier Añoveros Trías de Bes =

Spanish academic and historian (1944–2024)

- Born: 18 June 1944; Pamplona, Spain
- Died: 4 September 2024 (aged 80); Tui, Spain
- Education: University of Barcelona
- Occupation(s): Academic; Historian

Xabier Añoveros Trías de Bes (18 June 1944 – 4 September 2024) was a Spanish academic and historian. He was a professor of commercial law at the University of Barcelona and earned three doctorates in commercial law, economic sciences, and letters. He was a founding member of the Navarrese People's Union. He was the husband of the late Minister of Public Administration Julia García-Valdecasas.

Añoveros Trías de Bes died in Tui on 4 September 2024, at the age of 80.

== Publications ==
- Retablo de escritos javieranos (2005)
