= Illia Yefimchyk =

Belarusian bodybuilder (1988–2024)

Illia Golem
- Professional bodybuilder

Best statistics
- Height: 6 ft 1 in (185 cm)
- Weight: 340 lb (154 kg)

Illia Yefimchyk (Belarusian: Ілля Яфімчык; 23 April 1988 – 11 September 2024), more commonly known as Illia Golem, was a Belarusian bodybuilder. He was 6 feet 1 inch (1.85 m) tall and weighed 340 pounds (154 kg).

== Career ==
According to Muscle and Fitness magazine, he considered Arnold Schwarzenegger and Sylvester Stallone as his basic source of inspiration. As a teenager, Yefimchyk weighed approximately 70 kilograms (150 lb) and was not able to perform pushups. He adopted a strict training schedule and work ethic, including exercise physiology.

He gained the nicknames "The Mutant" and "The 340lbs Beast", and became known as "Golem" after the folk creature.

Yefimchyk ate a daily diet of at least 6,000 calories, and up to 17,000 on some days. At the time of his death, his chest measured 61 in (150 cm) and his biceps 25 in (64 cm).

Yefimchyk never competed in professional bodybuilding events and competitions. Instead, he regularly shared his daily training routines via social media platforms, which garnered him media attention. His most notable feats in bodybuilding were 600-pound (270 kg) bench press and 700-pound (320 kg) deadlift, which gained him a huge fanbase including over 300,000 Instagram followers.

== Death ==
Yefimchyk suffered a heart attack on 6 September 2024. His wife Anna performed chest compressions until an ambulance arrived, and he was admitted to intensive care in a coma. He was pronounced dead five days later, on 11 September, at the age of 36. The cause of death was cardiac arrest.
