= Robert A. Collier Jr. =

American judge and politician (1931–2024)

Member of the North Carolina House of Representatives
- In office 1965–1967

Personal details
- Born: January 13, 1931 Statesville, North Carolina, U.S.
- Died: September 8, 2024 (aged 93)
- Party: Democratic
- Education: University of North Carolina; University of North Carolina Law School
- Occupation: Judge

Robert A. Collier Jr. (January 13, 1931 – September 8, 2024) was an American judge and politician. He served as a Democratic member of the North Carolina House of Representatives.

== Life and career ==
Collier was born in Statesville, North Carolina, on January 13, 1931. He attended Stateville High School, the University of North Carolina and the University of North Carolina Law School.

Collier served in the North Carolina House of Representatives from 1965 to 1967.

Collier died on September 8, 2024, at the age of 93.
