= Daniel Cordier (footballer) =

French footballer (1942–2024)

Personal information
- Date of birth: 26 July 1942
- Place of birth: Anzin, German-occupied Belgium and Northern France
- Date of death: September 2024 (aged 82)
- Height: 1.70 m (5 ft 7 in)
- Position: Defender

Youth career
- 1957–1960: Union Sportive de Valenciennes Anzin

Senior career*
Years	Team	Apps	(Gls)
1961–1968	Union Sportive de Valenciennes Anzin		
1968–1969	USL Dunkerque		
1969–1970	Union Sportive de Valenciennes Anzin		
1970–1973	Troyes		
1973–1975	Chaumont		
- * Club domestic league appearances and goals

Daniel Cordier (26 July 1942 – September 2024) was a French footballer who played as a defender.

== Biography ==
Born in Anzin on 26 July 1942, Cordier completed all of his training at Union Sportive de Valenciennes Anzin, where he joined at age 13. In total, he played 91 matches in Division 1 and 157 matches in Division 2.

Cordier died in September 2024, at the age of 82.
