= Olavi Heinonen (judge) =

Finnish judge (1938–2024)

President of the Supreme Court of Finland
- In office 1 October 1989 – 31 December 2001
- Preceded by: Curt Olsson
- Succeeded by: Leif Sevón

Personal details
- Born: Olavi Ensio Heinonen; 12 September 1938 Kuopio, Finland
- Died: 4 September 2024 (aged 85)
- Occupation: Judge

Olavi Ensio Heinonen (12 September 1938 – 4 September 2024) was a Finnish judge. He served as president of the Supreme Court from 1989 to 2001.

Heinonen died on 4 September 2024, at the age of 85.
