= Mara Malavenda =

Italian politician (1945–2024)

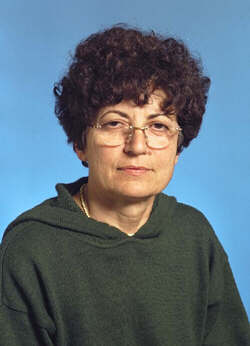

Member of the Chamber of Deputies of Italy for Campania 1
- In office 6 May 1996 – 29 May 2001

Personal details
- Born: Assunta Malavenda; 8 July 1945 Naples, Italy
- Died: 8 September 2024 (aged 79) Naples, Italy
- Party: PRC (expelled 1996)
- Occupation: Trade unionist

Assunta "Mara" Malavenda (8 July 1945 – 8 September 2024) was an Italian trade unionist and politician. A member of the Communist Refoundation Party until her expulsion in 1996, she served in the Chamber of Deputies from 1996 to 2001.

Malavenda died in Naples on 8 September 2024, at the age of 79.
