= Arthur Karlin =

American biochemist and professor (1936–2024)

- Born: January 14, 1936; Philadelphia, Pennsylvania, U.S.
- Died: September 20, 2024 (aged 88)
- Education: Swarthmore College, Rockefeller University
- Scientific career
- Workplaces: Columbia University, Woods Hole Oceanographic Institute.
- Academic advisors: David Nachmansohn

Arthur Karlin (January 14, 1936 – September 20, 2024) was an American biochemist and professor. He was the Higgins Professor of Biochemistry, Molecular Biochemistry and Molecular Biophysics, Physiology and Cellular Biophysics, and Neurology, as well as the Director of the Center for Molecular Recognition at Columbia University. Over the course of his career he was a member of a number of editorial boards, including the Proceedings of the National Academy of Sciences.

He is recognized for his role in the discovery of the structure of the acetylcholine receptor, which was a primary research focus throughout his career.

Karlin died on September 20, 2024, at the age of 88.

== Early life ==
Karlin was born on January 14, 1936, in Philadelphia, Pennsylvania. From 1949 to 1953 he attended Central High School. In 1953, he enrolled at Swarthmore College, where he received a Bachelor of Arts degree in mathematics in 1957. He received his PhD in 1962 from Rockefeller University, followed by completing a postdoctoral fellowship at the Columbia University College of Physicians and Surgeons in 1965 in the lab of David Nachmansohn.

== Research ==
Karlin's research on the acetylcholine receptor began during his postdoctoral work with Dr. David Nachmansohn. While it had been proposed that the molecule was a protein, its structure and mechanism had not been established. While in Nachmansohn's lab, Karlin designed a compound alongside colleague Mitchell Winnick that increased binding specificity to the receptor, allowing for easier identification of the molecule. By 1973, the molecule had been confirmed to be a protein and techniques had been developed to isolate it. Karlin, now with his own lab at Columbia, led his team to identify the five subunits of the molecule's quaternary structure.

Karlin continued to study the acetylcholine receptor over the course of his career, as well as a variety of other topics in biochemistry. These included his development of a novel method for identifying the amino acid at the receptor binding site of a variety of protein structures, investigating the structure, function, and conductivity of activated potassium channels, and building a mathematical model to represent how membrane potential and Ca2+ concentration is controlled in arterial smooth muscle cells.

== Selected publications ==
Year	Citation
2020	Rahman MM, Teng J, Worrell BT, Noviello CM, Lee M, Karlin A, Stowell MHB, Hibbs RE. Structure of the Native Muscle-type Nicotinic Receptor and Inhibition by Snake Venom Toxins. Neuron.
2015	Karlin A (2015) Membrane potential and Ca2+ concentration dependence on pressure and vasoactive agents in arterial smooth muscle: A model. J. Gen. Physiol. 146:79-96
2015	Liu G, Zakharov SI, Yao Y, Marx SO, and Karlin, A (2015) Positions of the cytoplasmic end of BK alpha S0 helix relative to S1-S6 and of beta1 TM1 and TM2 relative to S0-S6. J Gen Physiol
2013	Niu X, Liu G, Wu RS, Chudasama N, Zakharov SI, et al. (2013) Orientations and proximities of the extracellular ends of transmembrane helices S0 and S4 in open and closed BK potassium channels.
2012	Chan, P.J., Osteen, J.D., Xiong, D., Bohnen, M.S., Doshi, D., Sampson, K.J., Marx, S.O., Karlin, A., and Kass, R.S. (2012) Characterization of KCNQ1 atrial fibrillation mutations reveals distinct
2010	Liu, G., Niu, X., Wu, R.S., Chudasama, N., Yao, Y., Jin, X., Weinberg, R., Zakharov, S.I., Motoike, H., Marx, S.O., and Karlin, A. (2010) Location of modulatory Ã¯ÂÂ¢ subunits in BK potassium channels.
2009	Wu, R.S., Chudasama, N., Zakharov, S.I., Doshi, D., Motoike, H., Liu, G., Yao, Y., Niu, X., Deng, S.-X., Landry, D.W., Karlin, A., and Marx, S.O. (2009) Location of the beta 4 transmembrane helices in the BK potassium channel. J. Neurosci.
2008	Chung, D.Y., Chan, P. J., Bankston, J.R., Yang, L., Liu, G., Marx, S.O., Karlin, A., Kass, R.S. (2008) Location of KCNE1 relative to KCNQ1 in the IKS potassium channel by disulfide crosslinking of substituted cysteines. Proc. Natl. Acad. Sci.
2008	Liu, G., Zakharov, S., Yang., L., Wu, R., Deng, S., Landry, D., Karlin, A., Marx, S. (2008) Locations of the beta1 transmembrane helices in the BK potassium channel. Proc. Natl. Acad. Sci.
2008	Liu, G., Zakharov, S., Yang., L., Deng, S., Landry, D., Karlin, A., Marx, S. (2008) Position and role of the BK channel Ã¯ÂÂ¡ subunit S0 helix inferred from disulfide crosslinking. J. Gen. Physiol.
2004	Karlin A. A touching picture of nicotinic binding. Neuron.

== Awards and honors ==
- 1999: Member of the National Academy of Sciences
- 1994: Fellow of the American Academy of Arts and Sciences
- 1989: Stevens Triennial Prize, College of Physicians and Surgeons
- 1989: Fellow of the American Association for the Advancement of Science
- 1985: The Louis and Bert Freedman Foundation Award for Research in Biochemistry, NYAS
- 1975: Lucy G. Moses Prize in Basic Neurology

== Membership on editorial boards ==
- 1972-1983: Molecular Pharmacology
- 1979–1984, 1987-1991: Journal of Biological Chemistry
- 1986-1998: Proteins
- 1990-1995: Journal of Neuroscience
- 1996-2000: Neuron.
- 2009–2024: Proceedings of the National Academy of Sciences
