= George K. Schweitzer =

American historian (1924–2024)

George Keene Schweitzer (December 5, 1924 – September 20, 2024) was an American academic in chemistry and family history and local history. He also studied history of science and philosophy of science, for which he was awarded the Sc.D.

== Life and career ==
George Schweitzer was born in Poplar Bluff, Missouri, on December 5, 1924. He received his B.A. in Chemistry from Central College in 1945 and an M.S. and Ph.D. in Chemistry in 1946 and 1948 from the University of Illinois. He received his M.A. in History of Religion from Columbia University in 1961 and his Ph.D. in History from New York University in 1964. His Sc.D. was awarded in 1966.

He became a Professor of Chemistry at the University of Tennessee in 1948 and became an Alumni Distinguished Professor at that university in 1970. He was acknowledged as one of the longest-working employees at UT, and estimates he had taught chemistry to more than 45,000 students during his career. He did and continued to do research and consult with several of the facilities at Oak Ridge National Laboratory: K-25, Y-12, ORNL, ORAU, AEC, UT-AEC, ARP. His research relates to PET body scanners and fission studies.

He held a National Science Foundation faculty fellowship in 1959–1960 at Columbia, and has lectured extensively at numerous other universities. Schweitzer has published over 160 papers including 18 guidebooks on family history research.

Schweitzer died on September 20, 2024, at the age of 99.

George Schweitzer has been recognized/honored as being the longest serving Professor by the Guinness Book of World Records: from June 6, 1948 to September 20, 2024, for a total of 76 years and 106 days.

== Schweitzer's World View ==
Dr. George K. Schweitzer's World View, in his words:

"The universe is the product of an eternal, infinitely compassionate super cosmic CONSCIOUSNESS. The best exemplification of this is the Jesus Event. In producing the universe, the CONSCIOUSNESS has endowed it with consciousness and has granted it the freedom, self-subsistence, and autonomy to develop itself. Consciousness sleeps in the rock, stirs in the plant, becomes obvious in the animal, and approaches fullness in people. Out of the freedom to develop itself, the universe has rebelled against the CONSCIOUSNESS, this relation being the source of evil in the world. The ultimate aim of consciousness is to bring everything in compassionate harmony by the allure of pure unbounded love.

Claims of science/religious conflict are usually expositions of a materialistic world view craftily disguised as the only rational interpretation of selected scientific investigations. If you have trouble believing in miracles, you are living in the old deterministic universe of Newton, Descartes, and LaPlace rather than in the more recent probabilistic universe of Einstein, Bohr, and Schrodinger."

== Sources ==
- https://chem.utk.edu/remembering-george-k-schweitzer/
- http://www.yogs.com/OtherPubs/GeorgeSchweitzer.htm
- Who's Who in America 44th Edition, p. 2498
