= Reza Saraj =

Iranian politician (1966–2024)

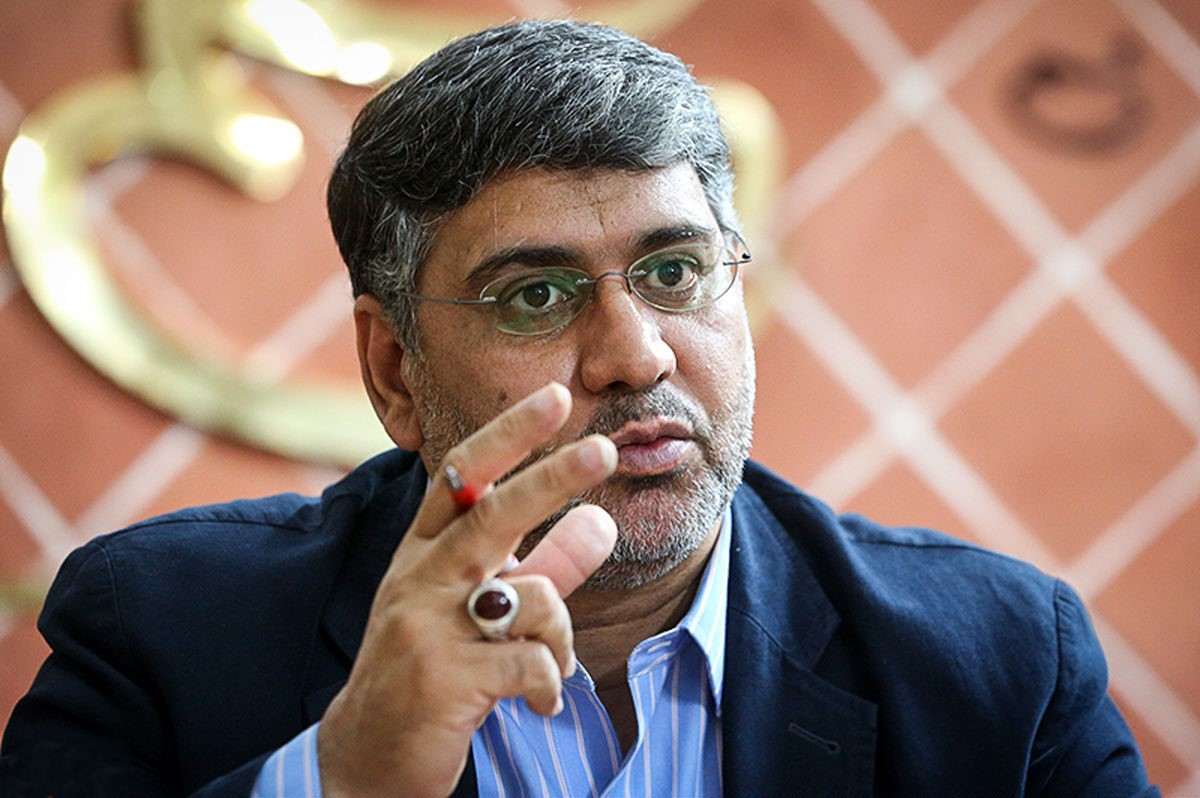
Image of Reza Seraj

Reza Saraj (Persian: رضا سراج; 9 August 1965 – 21 September 2024) was an Iranian politician who was the head of foreign intelligence for the Intelligence Organization of the Islamic Revolutionary Guard Corps (IRGC). He previously led the Special Operations Unit of the IRGC Intelligence Organization and was responsible for a series of failed operations against Israeli citizens. In June 2023, the United States Department of the Treasury sanctioned him in connection with the IRGC's overseas terrorism activities. He was accused by Washington of participating in terrorist plots outside Iran, targeting former U.S. government officials, Iranian-American dual citizens, and Iranian dissidents opposed to the Islamic Republic.

In January 2024, he was appointed spokesperson and deputy for culture and communications of the Secretariat of the Supreme National Security Council, replacing Keyvan Khosravi.

Born on 9 August 1965 Saraj died on 21 September 2024, at the age of 59.
