= Dov Jaron =

American engineer (1935–2024)

Dov Jaron (October 29, 1935 – September 24, 2024) was an American engineer, who served as the Calhoun Distinguished Professor of Engineering in Medicine at Drexel University and was a Fellow of Institute of Electrical and Electronics Engineers, American Association for the Advancement of Science, Academy of Surgical Research, American Institute of Medical and Biological Engineering and World Academy for Biomedical Technology.

In 1967, he received his PhD degree in Biomedical Engineering from the University of Pennsylvania.

Jaron died on September 24, 2024, at the age of 88.
