= Mário Genival Tourinho =

Brazilian politician (1933–2024)

Member of the Chamber of Deputies of Brazil for Minas Gerais
- In office 1975–1983

Personal details
- Born: 4 May 1933 Montes Claros, Minas Gerais, Brazil
- Died: 21 September 2024 (aged 91) Belo Horizonte, Minas Gerais, Brazil
- Political party: PMDB
- Education: Federal University of Minas Gerais

Mário Genival Tourinho (4 May 1933 – 21 September 2024) was a Brazilian politician. A member of the Brazilian Democratic Movement Party, he served in the Chamber of Deputies from 1975 to 1983.

Tourinho died in Belo Horizonte on 21 September 2024, at the age of 91.
