= Vladas Terleckas =

Lithuanian politician (1939–2024)

Vladas Terleckas (13 September 1939 – 6 September 2024) was a Lithuanian politician. In 1990 he was among those who signed the Act of the Re-Establishment of the State of Lithuania.

He was also active as a writer, publishing numerous books on the economy.

Terleckas died on 6 September 2024, at the age of 84.
