= Old Dry Keith =

British TikToker (died September 2024)

A humorous cartoon inspired by Old Dry Keith

Keith Brown, also known as "Old Dry Keith" (Chinese: 干巴基思大叔; pinyin: Gānba Jīsī Dàshū; lit. 'Dry Uncle Keith', or 干巴大叔, Gānba Dàshū), was a British petroleum engineer who gained notoriety on Douyin in 2024 due to his bland sandwiches, or "dry lunches".

Videos of him making sandwiches were uploaded to Douyin by his wife Zhang Jian, whom he met in Malaysia in 2007. His videos led to the proliferation of sections in Chinese supermarkets known as "dry shopping areas", where shoppers could buy sandwich ingredients that were similarly as dry as those used by Brown. Fans were noted as being "grimly fascinated by his dry, boring sandwiches". His videos were seen as contributing to a trend in China of "white people food" throughout 2024.

In his first marriage, he had both a son and a daughter. He then went on to have another son in his second marriage.

Brown died in September 2024 of bone cancer.
