= Vladimir Turiyansky =

Russian poet, composer and bard (1935–2024)

- Владимир Туриянский
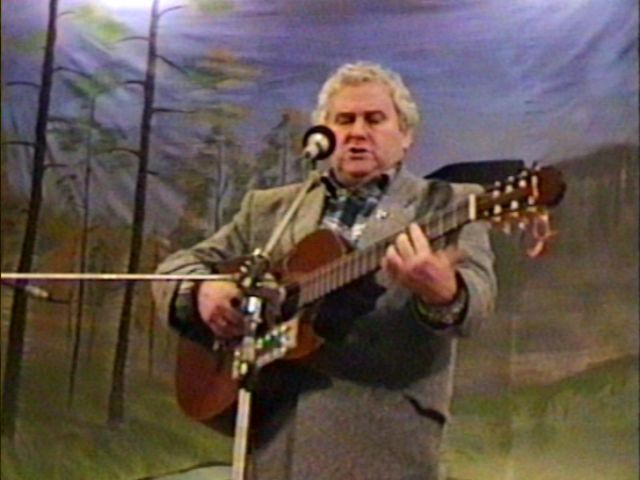
- Turiyansky in 1995
- Born: Vladimir Lvovich Turiyansky; 21 August 1935; Moscow, Russian SFSR, USSR
- Died: 2 September 2024 (aged 89)
- Occupations: Poet; composer; singer-songwriter; guitarist
- Musical career
- Genres: Bard
- Instruments: Vocals; Russian guitar

Vladimir Lvovich Turiyansky (Russian: Владимир Львович Туриянский; 21 August 1935 – 2 September 2024) was a Russian poet, composer, and bard.

After studying for three years in the Moscow State Art and Cultural University, Turiyansky worked as a geologist, going on expeditions to Siberia. Turiyansky then became an electrical expert, where he calibrated geophysical apparatuses.

In 1959, Turiyansky began writing songs, primarily around his poems.

Turiyansky later lived in Moscow. He died on 2 September 2024, at the age of 89.
