= Jerzy Wuttke =

Polish politician (1945–2024)

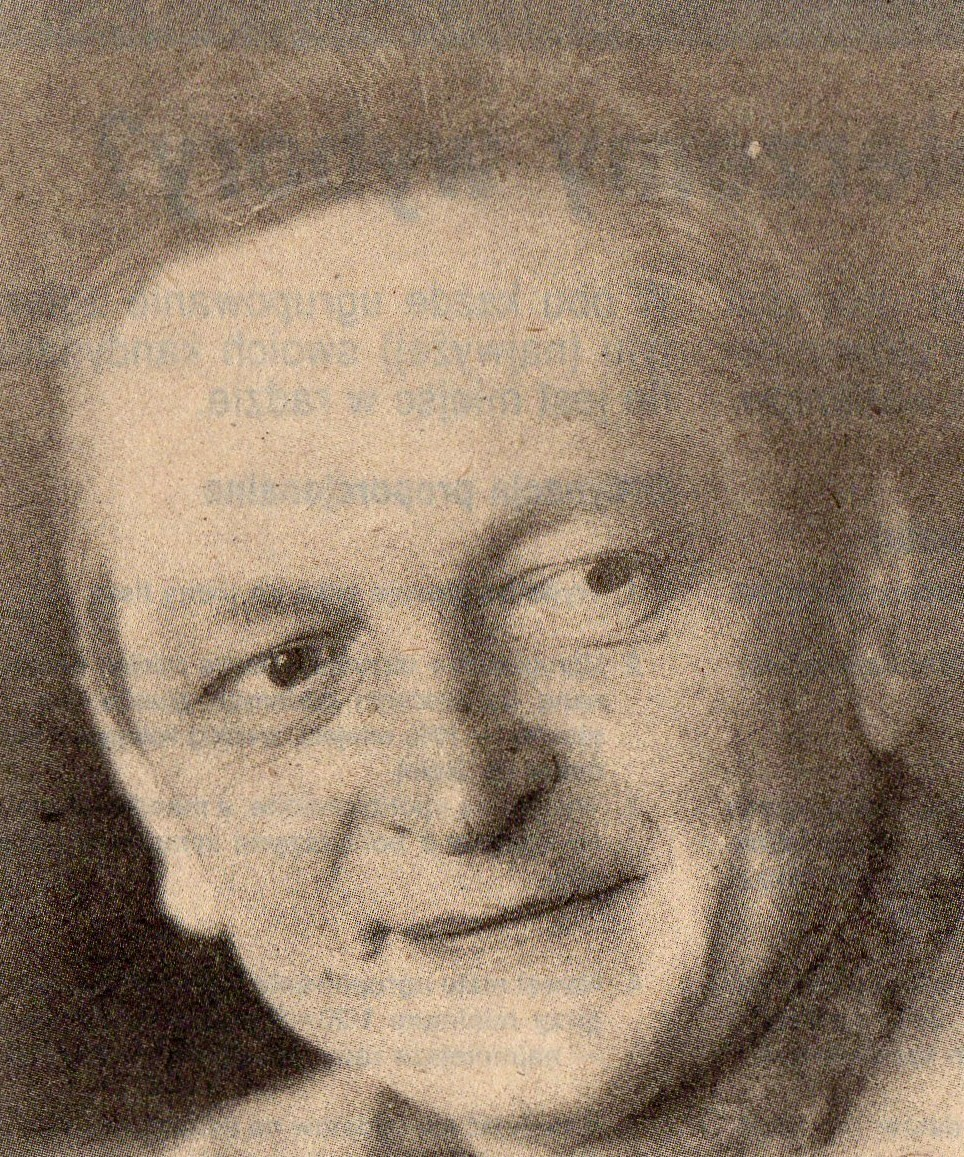
- Wuttke in 1990

Member of the Sejm
- In office 19 September 1993 – 20 October 1997
- In office 4 July 1989 – 25 October 1991

Personal details
- Born: Jerzy Józef Wuttke; 29 August 1945 Chorzów, Poland
- Died: 18 September 2024 (aged 79)
- Party: KO "S"; BBWR
- Education: Jan Matejko Academy of Fine Arts
- Occupation: Visual artist

Jerzy Józef Wuttke (29 August 1945 – 18 September 2024) was a Polish visual artist and politician. A member of the Solidarity Citizens' Committee and the Nonpartisan Bloc for Support of Reforms, he served in the Sejm from 1989 to 1991 and again from 1993 to 1997.

Wuttke died on 18 September 2024, at the age of 79.
