= Hadelin de La Tour du Pin =

French diplomat (1951–2024)

Ambassador of France to Monaco
- In office 2014–2016
- Monarch: Albert II, Prince of Monaco
- President: François Hollande

Personal details
- Born: 26 August 1951 Antananarivo, Madagascar
- Died: 23 September 2024 (aged 73) Paris, France
- Education: Paris 1 Panthéon-Sorbonne University; Sciences Po, ÉNA
- Profession: Diplomat

Hadelin de La Tour du Pin Chambly de La Charce (26 August 1951 – 23 September 2024) was a French diplomat who served as the Ambassador of France to Monaco.

== Early life ==
De La Tour was born on 26 August 1951. He graduated from Sciences Po and the École nationale d'administration in 1977.

== Career ==
De La Tour joined the French foreign service in 1977. He served as ambassador to Guinea (1994–1997), Zimbabwe (1997–2000), Cyprus (2003–2006), Venezuela (2006–2009), and the Pacific Region (2009–2014). He succeeded Hughes Moret as Ambassador to Monaco in 2014.

De La Tour was a Knight of the Legion of Honour and the National Order of Merit.

== Death ==
De La Tour died in Paris on 23 September 2024, at the age of 73.
