= László Mészáros =

Hungarian footballer (1977–2024)

Personal information
- Date of birth: 12 May 1977
- Place of birth: Hungary
- Date of death: September 2024 (aged 47)
- Position: Midfielder

Youth career
- –1991: Debreceni VSC
- 1991–1992: Swift Roermond
- 1992–1995: Fortuna Sittard
- 1995–1997: VVV Venlo

Senior career*
Years	Team	Apps	(Gls)
1997–1998	ASV Einigkeit Süchteln		
1998–2001	Hajdúszoboszlói SE		
2001–2006	Fortuna Sittard	110	(4)
- * Club domestic league appearances and goals

László Mészáros (12 May 1977 – September 2024) was a Hungarian footballer who played as a midfielder.

He played 110 games for Fortuna Sittard, 12 in the Eredivisie and the rest in the Eerste Divisie, and scored 4 goals.

Mészáros died in September 2024, at the age of 47.
