= Céline Orgelle Kentsop =

Cameroonian actress (1970–2024)

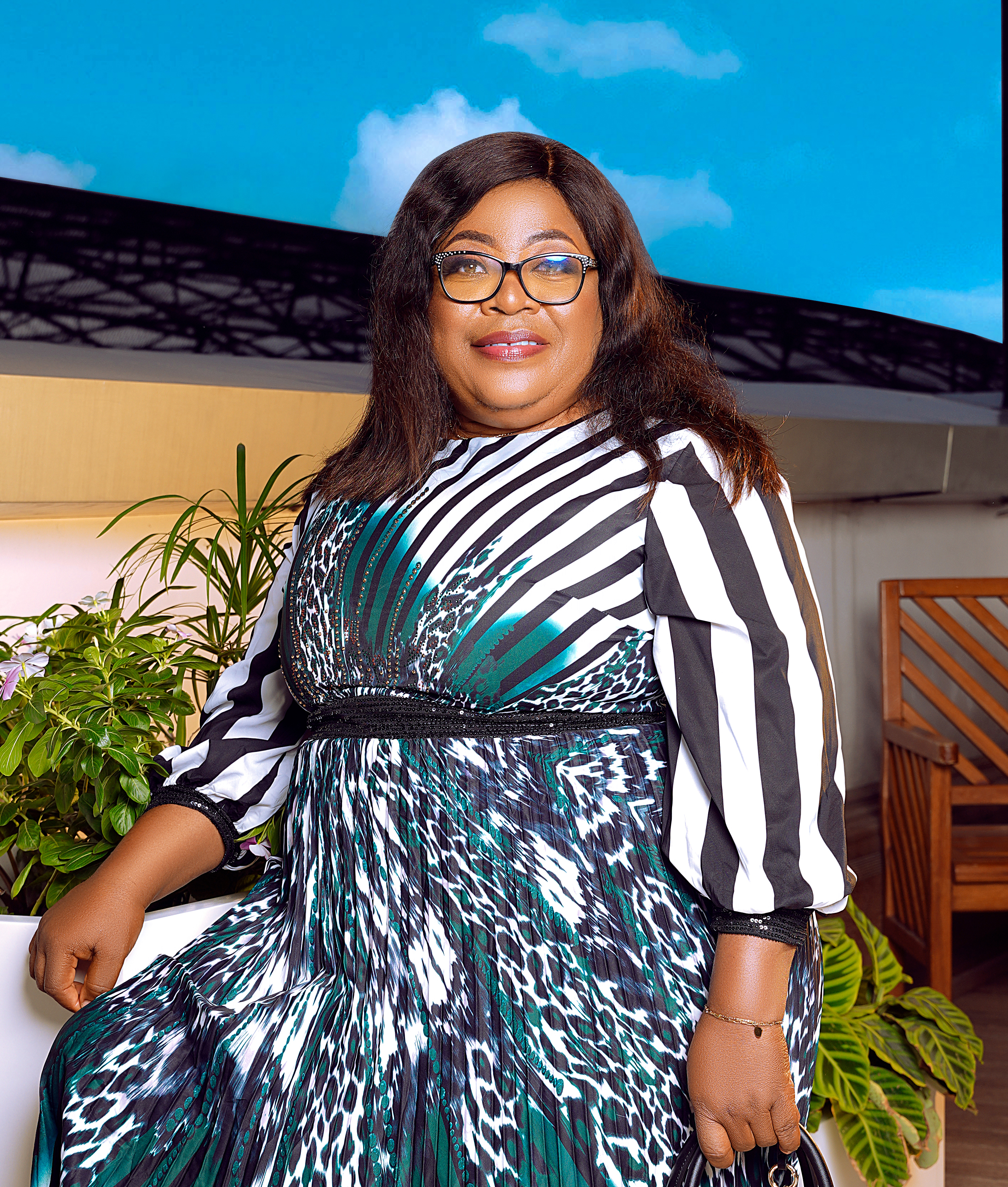
- Kentsop in 2021
- Born: 4 May 1970; Loum, Cameroon
- Died: 4 September 2024 (aged 54); Douala, Cameroon
- Occupation: Actress

Céline Orgelle Kentsop (4 May 1970 – 4 September 2024), also known under the pseudonym Mami Ton, was a Cameroonian actress.

== Biography ==
Born in Loum on 4 May 1970, Kentsop aspired to become a nurse as a child. However, after failing to reach her dream, she moved to Douala in 1992 in search of work. There, she met Flobert Tankou, who introduced her to acting. Director and producer Ebenezer Kepombia introduced her to the world of film.

Kentsop became an ambassador of the Association des personnes préférées, in which she campaigned for the rights of amputees alongside her daughter Mirette. She claimed to be the widow of Antoine Tohe, who was known for his impersonations of President Paul Biya. She was the mother of four children and grandmother of six.

Kentsop died of a hemorrhagic stroke in Douala, on 4 September 2024, at the age of 54.

== Filmography ==
=== Film ===
- Conséquences Tribales (2018)

=== Television ===
- Foyer Polygamique (2005)
- Ennemie Intime (2014)
- Reine Blanche (2016)
- Femme autoritaire (2018)
- Habiba (2018)
- La nouvelle épouse (2020)

=== Web series ===
- La fille de Mamiton (2019)

== Distinctions ==
- Best actress of Canal 2'Or (2011, 2013)
- Surprise Honorific Prize at the Festival Komane de Bafoussam
