= Melina Furman =

Argentine investigative author and teacher (1975–2024)

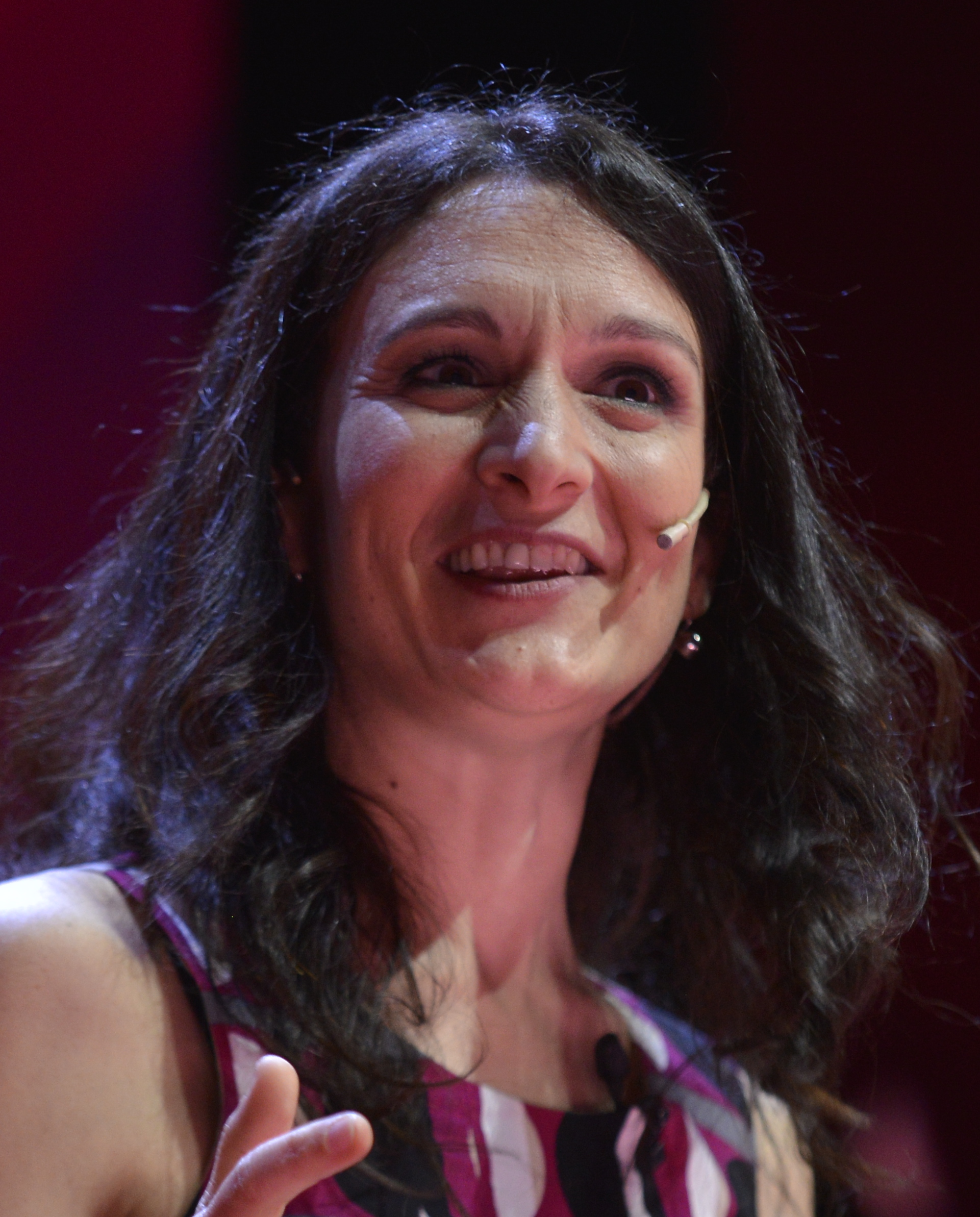
- Furman in 2017
- Born: 18 July 1975
- Died: 6 September 2024 (aged 49)
- Occupations: Author, teacher, biologist

Melina Furman (18 July 1975 – 6 September 2024) was an Argentine investigative author, teacher and biologist.

== Life and career ==
Furman was born on 18 July 1975. She graduated from the Universidad de Buenos Aires with a certificate in biologic sciences, and with a masters and a Ph.D. from Columbia University in the United States. Furman worked as investigative professor at the Universidad de San Andres.

She is considered by many, such as Argentine columnist Sebastian Campanero, as "the most influential education thinker in Spanish".

Furman died of colon cancer on 6 September 2024, at the age of 49.

== See also ==
- List of Argentines
