= Sudjadi =

Indonesian politician (1943–2024)

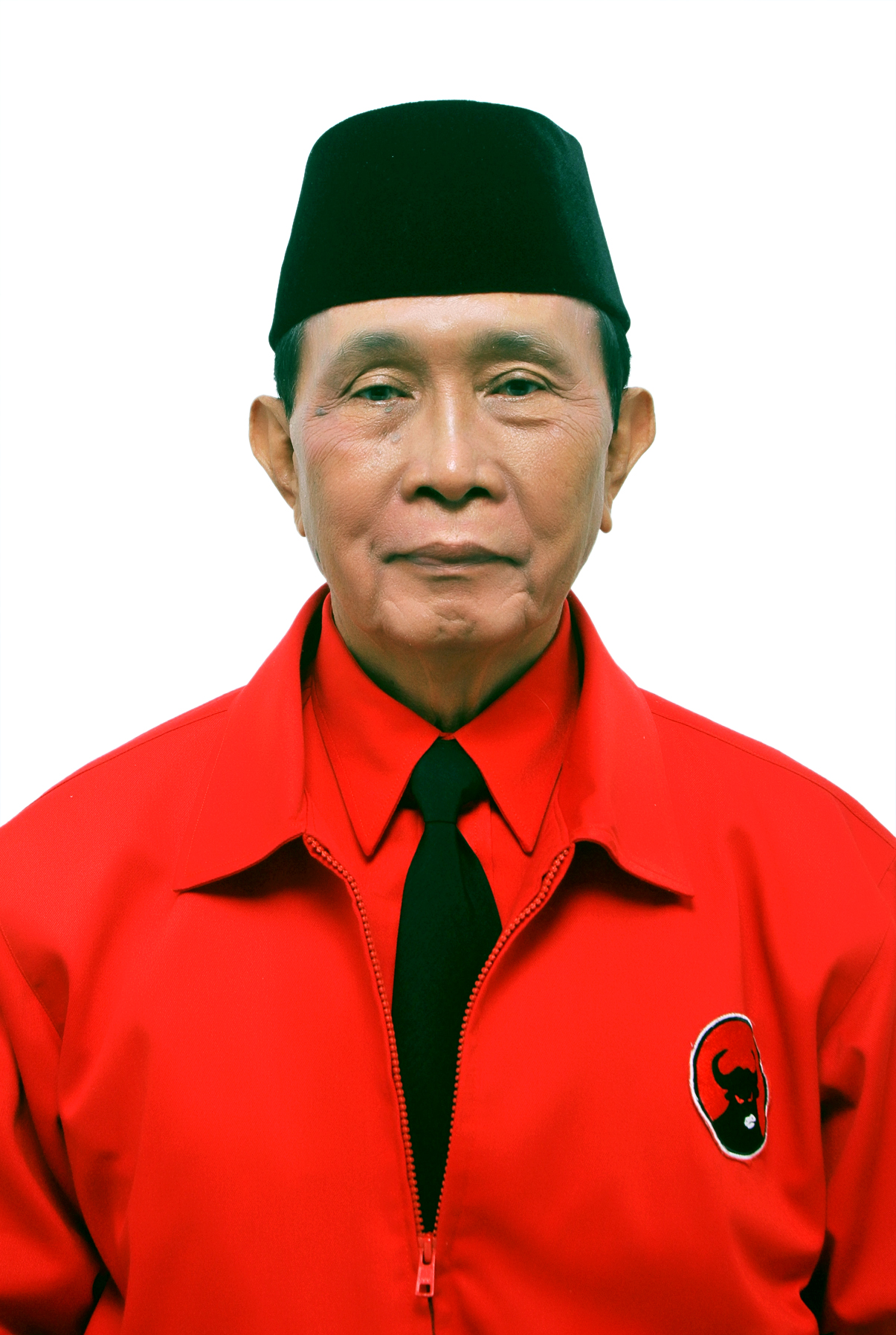
- Sudjadi in 2013

Member of the House of Representatives of Indonesia for Central Java IV
- In office 1 October 2009 – 24 September 2024

Personal details
- Born: 27 July 1943 Yogyakarta, Japanese-occupied Dutch East Indies
- Died: 24 September 2024 (aged 81) Surakarta, Indonesia
- Party: PDI-P
- Education: Gadjah Mada University
- Occupation: Engineer

Sudjadi (27 July 1943 – 24 September 2024) was an Indonesian engineer and politician. A member of the Indonesian Democratic Party of Struggle, he served in the House of Representatives from 2009 to 2024.

Sudjadi died in Surakarta on 24 September 2024, at the age of 81.
