= Stan Asofsky =

American aficionado, book club administrator and tennis facility manager

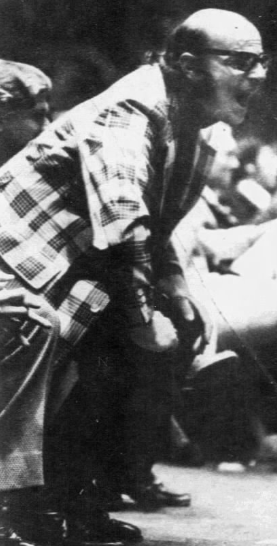
- Asofsky in 1974
- Born: Stanley Edward Asofsky; June 16, 1937; Brooklyn, New York, U.S.
- Died: September 12, 2024 (aged 87)
- Education: Baruch College
- Occupations: Aficionado, book club administrator, tennis facility manager

Stanley Edward Asofsky (June 16, 1937 – September 12, 2024), also known as The Human Backboard, was an American aficionado, book club administrator and tennis facility manager. He was best known for being a superfan of the New York Knicks.

Asofsky died on September 12, 2024, at the age of 87.
