= Joe Comfort (homeless man) =

American homeless man

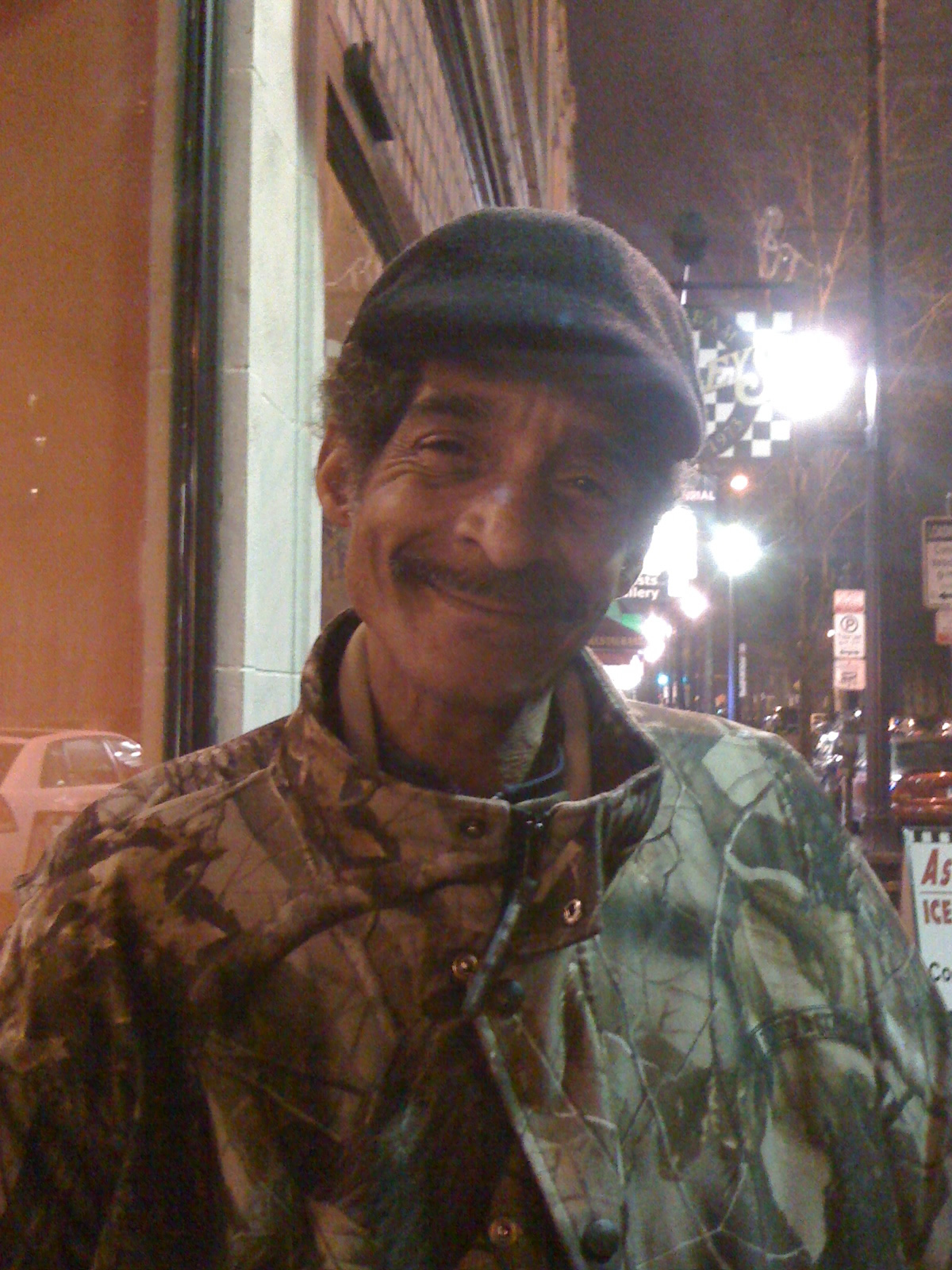
- Undated photo of Comfort
- Born: June 22, 1954; New Haven, Connecticut, U.S.A.
- Died: September 14, 2024 (aged 70); New Haven, Connecticut, U.S.A.

Joe Comfort (June 22, 1954 – September 14, 2024) was an American homeless man who lived in New Haven, Connecticut. He has been described as a New Haven "street legend". He was featured in the Local Characters Trading Cards for New Haven, exhibited in 2005. He earned money doing odd jobs including raking leaves, window washing, and repairs. He also worked for Yale fraternities, cleaning up after parties.

Joe Comfort was at one point a carpenter for the Ringling Bros. and Barnum & Bailey Circus, and claimed to at one point be a licensed plumber. He attributes his lack of employment to potential employers' fear of having to pay workers compensation if his medical problems recur.

== Advocacy ==
Joe Comfort spoke out at public hearings against welfare cuts in the state of Connecticut. He also spoke out against harassment of homeless people by the police.
