= David Garrard Lowe =

American historian (1933–2024)

David Garrard Lowe (né Lowenstein, January 9, 1933 – September 21, 2024) was an American historian, architectural preservationist, and author. He founded the Beaux-Arts Alliance in 1995. He was a communicant of the Episcopal Church of the Resurrection (Manhattan).

The David Garrard Lowe Historic Chicago Photograph Collection is housed at the Art Institute of Chicago's Ryerson and Burnham Libraries.

== Books ==
- Lost Chicago (University of Chicago Press, 1975)
  - (Gramercy, 1993) ISBN 9780517468883
- Chicago Interiors: Views of a Splendid World (Contemporary Books, 1979) ISBN 9780809259922
- Stanford White's New York (Doubleday, 1992) ISBN 9780385260169
- Beaux-Arts New York: An Exhibition at the Gallery of the New York School of Interior Design (New York School of Interior Design, 1993)
- Stanford White and New York in the Gilded Age (New York School of Interior Design, 1994)
- Beaux Arts New York (Watson-Guptill, 1998) ISBN 9780823004812
- Chicago and American Architecture, Whitehall Lecture, (Henry Morrison Flagler Museum, 2001)
- Art Deco New York (Watson-Guptill, 2004) ISBN 9780823002849
