= Robert Kościelny =

Polish politician (1961–2024)

Member of the Sejm
- In office 19 September 1993 – 20 October 1997
- Constituency: Kraków

Personal details
- Born: 2 April 1961 Skawina, Poland
- Died: 9 September 2024 (aged 63)
- Party: KPN
- Education: AGH University of Krakow; Maria Skłodowska-Curie Medical University of Warsaw; University of Warsaw
- Occupation: Engineer

Robert Kościelny (2 April 1961 – 9 September 2024) was a Polish engineer and politician. A member of the Confederation of Independent Poland, he served in the Sejm from 1993 to 1997.

Kościelny died on 9 September 2024, at the age of 63.
