= Stefan Landsberger =

Dutch sinologist (1955–2024)

Stefan Landsberger (1955 – 26 September 2024) was a Dutch sinologist who served as Olfert Dapper Professor of Contemporary Chinese Culture at the University of Amsterdam. He was also known for his collection of Chinese propaganda posters, his publications and his website Chineseposters.net.

== Education ==
Landsberger studied Sinology at Leiden University (1975–1982). His MA thesis (1982) was titled "After the Bumper Harvest”: China's Socialist Education Movement as seen through short stories from the Sixties. His PhD (1994) was titled "Visualizing the Future: Chinese Propaganda Posters from the ‘Four Modernizations’ Era, 1978-1988".

== Career ==
After working as a researcher on several projects on modern China at the Sinological Institute, Leiden in the 1990s, Landsberger became an associate professor in the Dept of Chinese Studies in 1996.

== Selected publications ==
- Beijing Garbage - A City Besieged by Waste (Amsterdam University Press, 2019). ISBN 9789048542871
- Chinese Posters - The IISH/Landsberger Collections (Munich: Prestel Verlag, 2009).
- Paint it red – Fifty years of Chinese Propaganda Posters (Groningen: Uitgeverij Intermed, 1998).
- Chinese Propaganda Posters – From Revolution to Modernization (Amsterdam, Singapore; Armonk: The Pepin Press; M.E. Sharpe 1995, 1998, 2001).
- “Die Vergötterung Maos: Bilder und Praktiken in der Kulturrevolution und darüber hinaus”, in Helmut Opletal (ed.) Die Kultur der Kulturrevolution - Personenkult und politisches Design im China von Mao Zedong (Gent: Snoeck Publishers, 2011), pp. 93–103.
- “National Image Management Begins at Home: Imagining the New Olympic Citizen”, in Jian (Jay) Wang (ed.), Soft Power in China - Public Diplomacy through Communication (Global Public Diplomacy) (New York: Palgrave Macmillan, 2010), pp. 117–133. (with Jeroen de Kloet and Gladys P.L. Chong).
- “Harmony, Olympic Manners and Morals – Chinese Television and the ‘New Propaganda’”. European Journal of East Asian Studies 8(2) (2009), pp. 331-355.
- “Encountering the European and Western Other in Chinese Propaganda Posters”, in Michael Wintle (ed.), Images of Europe: Europe and European civilization as seen from its margins and by the rest of the world, in the nineteenth and twentieth centuries (Brussels: P.I.E. Peter Lang S.A., 2008), pp. 147–175.
- “Designing Propaganda: The Business of Politics”. in H.X. Zhang & L. Parker (eds), ChinaDesign Now (London: V&A Publishing, 2008), pp. 53–56.
- “Propaganda Posters in the Reform Era: Promoting Patriotism or Providing Public Information”, in Frank Columbus (ed.), Asian Economic and Political Issues vol. 10 (New York: Nova Science Publishers Inc., 2004), pp. 27–57.
- “The Deification of Mao: Religious Imagery and Practices during the Cultural Revolution and Beyond”, in Woei Lien Chong (ed.), China's Great Proletarian Cultural Revolution: Master Narratives and Post-Mao Counternarratives (Boulder, CO: Rowman & Littlefield Publishers, 2002), pp. 139–184.
- “Learning by What Example? Educational Propaganda in Twenty-first-Century China”, Critical Asian Studies 33(4) (December 2001), pp. 541–571.
- “Role Modelling in Mainland China During the ‘Four Modernizations’ Era: The Visual Dimension”, in Chun‑chieh Huang and Erik Zürcher (eds), Norms and the State in China (Leiden, etc.: E.J. Brill, 1993), pp. 359‑376.
- “A Chinese Future with Western Characteristics: Chinese Visual Propaganda During the ‘Four Modernizations’ (1978‑1988)”, in K.W. Radtke and A.J. Saich (eds), China’s Modernisation: Westernisation and Acculturation (Stuttgart: Franz Steiner Verlag, 1993), pp. 177–194.

== See also ==
- Propaganda in China
- History of Propaganda
