= Taimuraz Batagov =

Russian politician (1940–2024)

- Таймураз Батагов

Member of the Congress of People's Deputies of Russia
- In office 18 March 1990 – 24 September 1993

Personal details
- Born: Taimuraz Dzhetagazovich Batagov; 16 February 1940 Beslan, North Ossetian ASSR, Russian SFSR, USSR
- Died: 17 September 2024 (aged 84) North Ossetia–Alania, Russia
- Party: CPSU
- Education: Saratov State Academy of Law; Academy of the USSR Ministry of Internal Affairs
- Occupation: Military officer Lawyer

Taimuraz Dzhetagazovich Batagov (Russian: Таймураз Джетагазович Батагов; Ossetian: Бӕтӕгаты Таймураз; 16 February 1940 – 17 September 2024) was a Russian military officer, lawyer, and politician. A member of the Communist Party of the Soviet Union, he served in the Congress of People's Deputies of Russia from 1990 to 1993.

Batagov died in North Ossetia–Alania on 17 September 2024, at the age of 84.
