= Ron Warren =

Australian rules footballer

Personal information
- Full name: Ron Warren
- Born: 5 October 1928
- Died: 20 September 2024 (aged 95)
- Original team: East Geelong
- Height: 178 cm (5 ft 10 in)
- Weight: 70 kg (154 lb)

Playing career^{1}
Years	Club	Games (Goals)
1949	Geelong	5 (0)
- ^{1} Playing statistics correct to the end of 1949.

Ron Warren (5 October 1928 – 20 September 2024) was an Australian rules footballer who played with Geelong in the Victorian Football League (VFL).

Warren played at the Cats between 1947 and 1951, predominantly in the reserve grade team. However, he managed to play five senior games in 1949 under Reg Hickey, who returned to coach Geelong that year.
