= Kirby Sullivan =

American judge and politician (1927–2024)

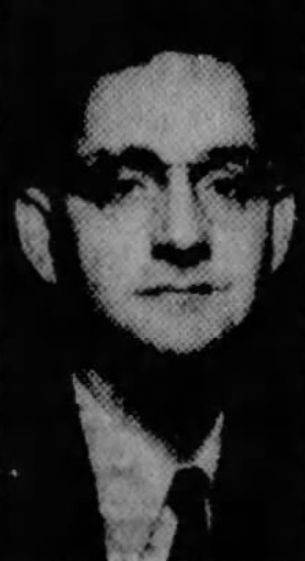
- Sullivan in 1955

Member of the North Carolina House of Representatives
- In office 1955–1957

Personal details
- Born: October 2, 1927 Brunswick County, North Carolina, U.S.
- Died: September 27, 2024 (aged 96)
- Party: Democratic
- Education: University of North Carolina; University of North Carolina Law School
- Occupation: Judge

Kirby Sullivan (October 2, 1927 – September 27, 2024) was an American judge and politician. He served as a Democratic member of the North Carolina House of Representatives.

== Life and career ==
Sullivan was born in Brunswick County, North Carolina on October 2, 1927. He attended the University of North Carolina and the University of North Carolina Law School.

Sullivan served in the North Carolina House of Representatives from 1955 to 1957.

Sullivan died on September 27, 2024, at the age of 96.
