= Richard Allen Thompson =

American politician (1934–2024)

Member of the Indiana House of Representatives from the 47th district
- In office February 6, 1979 – November 3, 1982

Member of the Indiana House of Representatives from the 40th district
- In office November 3, 1982 – November 7, 1984

Member of the Indiana Senate from the 24th district
- In office November 7, 1984 – November 6, 1996

Personal details
- Born: May 18, 1934
- Died: September 14, 2024 (aged 90)
- Party: Republican

Richard Allen Thompson (May 18, 1934 – September 14, 2024) was an American politician. He served as a Republican member for the 40th and 47th district of the Indiana House of Representatives. He also served as a member for the 24th district of the Indiana Senate.

Thompson died on September 14, 2024, at the age of 90.
