= Lucienne Malovry =

French politician (1931–2024)

Lucienne Malovry (11 April 1931 – 22 September 2024) was a French politician who was a member of the Senate of France, representing the Val-d'Oise department. She was a member of the Union for a Popular Movement. Malovry died in September 2024, at the age of 93.
