= Puput Novel =

Indonesian actress, singer and presenter (1974–2024)

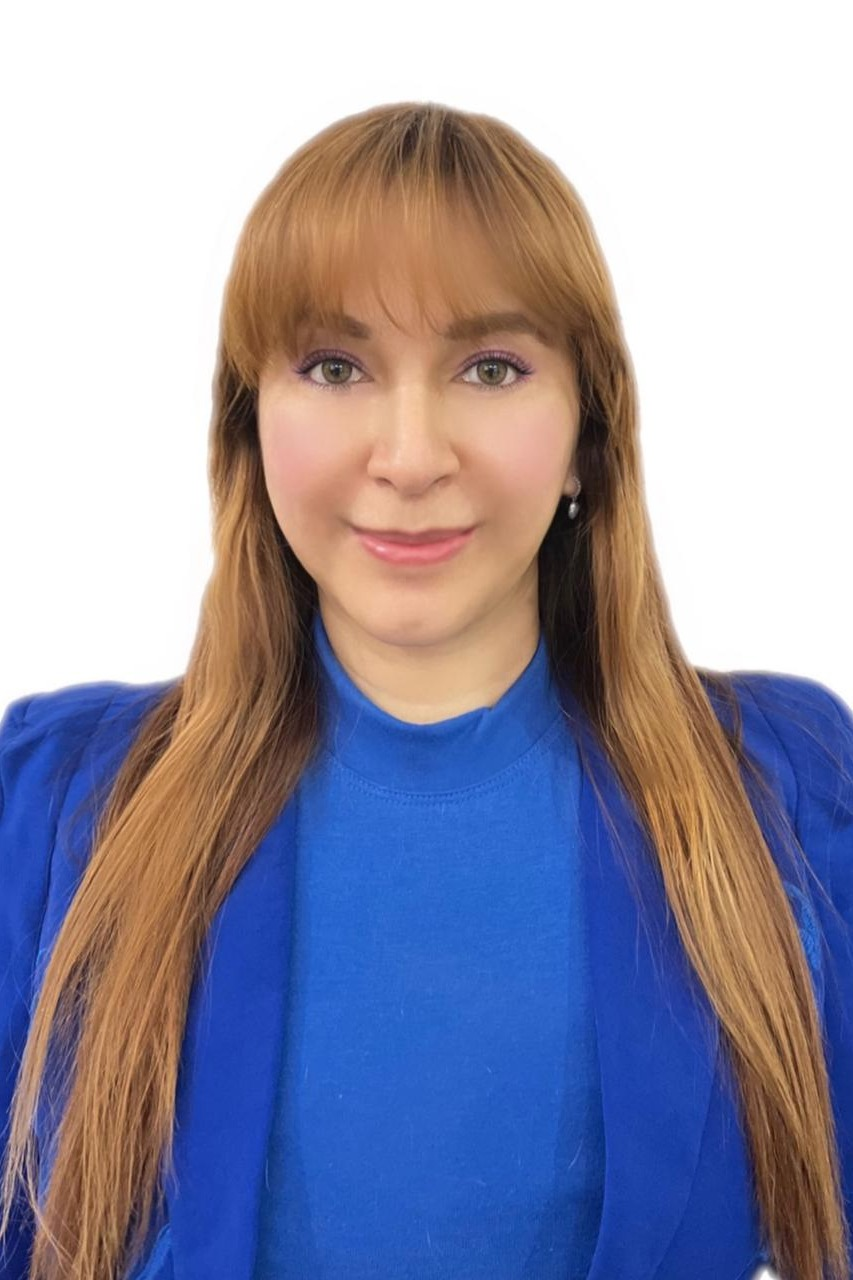
- Novel in 2023
- Born: 31 August 1974; Jakarta, Indonesia
- Died: 8 September 2024 (aged 50); Jakarta, Indonesia
- Occupations: Singer, actress, show host

Putri Zizi Novianti (31 August 1974 – 8 September 2024), better known as Puput Novel, was an Indonesian singer, politician, actress and television show host.

== Biography ==
Novel was born in Jakarta and began a career as a singer when she was a child in the 1970s. Her musical production includes more than 30 albums. In the late 1970s she started acting in film and later in TV series, most notably in the 1997-1998 series Keluargaku Sorgaku.

Puput Novel's involvement in politics began in 2004 as she became a candidate for the Ketua Kesatuan Perempuan Partai Golkar. In 2019 she was a candidate for that party during the legislative elections but was not elected. She had moved from the PAN, that she had joined in 2022, to the PPP party shortly before her death.

She died from breast cancer on 8 September 2024 at MMC Hospital, Kuningan, South Jakarta.

== Filmography ==
=== Feature films ===
Year	Film	Role	Notes
1978	Pacar Seorang Perjaka		
1979	Buah Hati Mama	Putri Pratiwi	
1980	Keagungan Tuhan		

=== TV series ===
Tahun	Film	Role	Note	Ref.
1998	Keluargaku Sorgaku	Sarah	Lead role	
2000	Di Bawah Naungan Cinta			
