= Nguyễn Đình Đầu =

Vietnamese historian (1920–2024)

Nguyễn Đình Đầu (12 March 1920 – 20 September 2024) was a Vietnamese historian. Đầu's research contributions include the early history of Saigon. He turned 100 in March 2020.

Đầu died on 20 September 2024, at the age of 104.
