= Beniamino Brocca =

Italian politician (1934–2024)

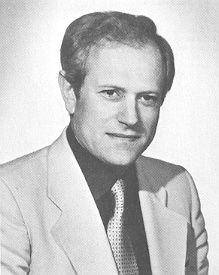
- Brocca in 1980

Member of the Chamber of Deputies of Italy for Verona-Padua
- In office 2 July 1976 – 22 April 1992

Personal details
- Born: 5 October 1934 Limena, Italy
- Died: 25 September 2024 (aged 89) Rome, Italy
- Party: DC
- Education: University of Padua
- Occupation: Schoolteacher

Beniamino Brocca (5 October 1934 – 25 September 2024) was an Italian politician. A member of Christian Democracy, he served in the Chamber of Deputies from 1976 to 1992.

Brocca died in Rome on 25 September 2024, at the age of 89.
