= Kong Xianjing =

Chinese engineer and academician (1952–2024)

- 孔宪京
- Born: 4 January 1952; Nanjing, Jiangsu, China
- Died: 10 September 2024 (aged 72)
- Education: Dalian University of Technology
- Scientific career
- Fields: Hydraulic structure
- Workplaces: Dalian University of Technology

Chinese name
- Simplified Chinese: 孔宪京
- Traditional Chinese: 孔憲京
Transcriptions
Standard Mandarin
- Hanyu Pinyin: Kǒng Xiànjīng

Kong Xianjing (4 January 1952 – 10 September 2024) was a Chinese engineer and academician of the Chinese Academy of Engineering, who formerly served as deputy party secretary and vice president of Dalian University of Technology.

== Biography ==
Kong was born in Nanjing, Jiangsu, on 4 January 1952, while his ancestral home is in Jining, Shandong. He earned a bachelor's degree in 1980, a master's degree in 1983, and a doctor's degree in 1990, all from Dalian Institute of Technology (now Dalian University of Technology).

After graduating from Dalian Institute of Technology in 1980, he stayed at the university and worked successively as associate professor (1990), full professor (1992), and doctoral supervisor (1995). He served as assistant to the president from March 1998 to March 1999 and the university's vice president from March 1999 to January 2002. In January 2002, he was appointed deputy party secretary of the university. After this office was terminated in March 2009, he became executive party secretary, serving until May 2012.

Kong died on 10 September 2024, at the age of 72.

== Honours and awards ==
- 1999 State Science and Technology Progress Award (Third Class)
- 2010 State Science and Technology Progress Award (Second Class)
- 2012 State Science and Technology Progress Award (Second Class)
- 27 November 2017 Member of the Chinese Academy of Engineering (CAE)
