= Gottfried Teubner =

German politician (1944–2024)

Gottfried Teuber

Member of the Landtag of Saxony
- In office October 1990 – August 2009

Personal details
- Born: Gottfried Arthur Teubner; 27 September 1944 Zwickau, Gau Saxony, Germany
- Died: 3 September 2024 (aged 79)
- Party: CDU–DDR (until 1990); CDU (1990–2024)
- Occupation: Electrician

Gottfried Arthur Teubner (27 September 1944 – 3 September 2024) was a German politician. A member of the Christian Democratic Union, he served in the Landtag of Saxony from 1990 to 2009.

Teubner died on 3 September 2024, at the age of 79.
