= Anne-José Lemonnier =

French poet (1958–2024)

- Born: 4 January 1958; Angers, France
- Died: 9 September 2024 (aged 66)
- Occupations: Poet, librarian

Anne-José Lemonnier (4 January 1958 – 9 September 2024) was a French poet, writer, and librarian. While working in Châteaulin, she lived in Saint-Nic. Lemonnier died in September 2024, at the age of 66.

== Bibliography ==
- L'Obole des chemins (1983)
- La Pâque des mers (1986)
- Les Portes de la presqu'île (1990)
- Une Langue sauvage (1996)
- Journal de lumière (1999)
- Gueule de poésie (2000)
- Lettre à l'océan (2000)
- Fugue bleue (2001)
- Falaise de proue (2003)
- L'Île sœur (2005)
- Archives de neige (2007)
- Polyphonie des saisons (2018)
- Au clavier des vagues (2020)
- Le cap en octaves (2023)
