= Amélia Hruschka =

Brazilian politician (1933–2024)

Member of the Legislative Assembly of Paraná
- In office 1 January 1983 – 31 January 1991

Personal details
- Born: Amélia de Almeida Hruschka; 19 February 1933 Lins, São Paulo, Brazil
- Died: 19 September 2024 (aged 91) Campo Mourão, Paraná, Brazil
- Party: MDB
- Education: Federal University of São Carlos
- Occupation: Lawyer

Amélia de Almeida Hruschka (19 February 1933 – 19 September 2024) was a Brazilian lawyer and politician. A member of the Brazilian Democratic Movement, she served in the Legislative Assembly of Paraná from 1983 to 1991.

Hruschka died in Campo Mourão on 19 September 2024, at the age of 91.
