= Ruth Schumann Antelme =

French academic and Egyptologist (1925–2024)

- Born: 1925
- Died: 13 September 2024 (aged 98–99); Paris, France
- Occupations: Academic; Egyptologist

Ruth Schumann Antelme (1925 – 13 September 2024) was a French academic and Egyptologist.

Antelme was an honorary researcher at the French National Center for Scientific Research and a professor at the École du Louvre. She led missions to Upper Egypt and was an assistant to Christiane Desroches Noblecourt. She also published a number of works, primarily on Ancient Egypt. Antelme died in Paris on 13 September 2024.

== Publications ==
- Nétèr : Dieux d'Égypte (1992)
- Cahier de Calligraphie. 5. Hiéroglyphes (1997)
- Lecture illustrée des hiéroglyphes, l'écriture sacrée de l'Égypte (1998)
- Les Secrets d'Hathor. Amour, Érotisme et Sexualité dans L'Égypte Pharaonique (1999)
- Sacred Sexuality in Ancient Egypt : The Erotic Secrets of the Forbidden Papyrus (2001)
- Dictionnaire Illustré des Dieux de L'Égypte (2003)
- Nout, Le Cosmos des Pharaons (2007)
