= Joseph Haruna Duza =

Nigerian politician (1963–2024)

Member of the Niger State House of Assembly
- Constituency: Munya

Personal details
- Born: 1963 Niger State, Nigeria
- Died: 13 September 2024 (aged 61)
- Party: All Progressives Congress
- Occupation: Politician

Joseph Haruna Duza (1963 – 13 September 2024) was a Nigerian politician who served as the State Representative for the Munya constituency in the Niger State House of Assembly. He died in September 2024 at the age of 61. Prior to his political career, he was a Nigerian Naval Force officer.
