= José Patriota =

Brazilian politician (1960–2024)

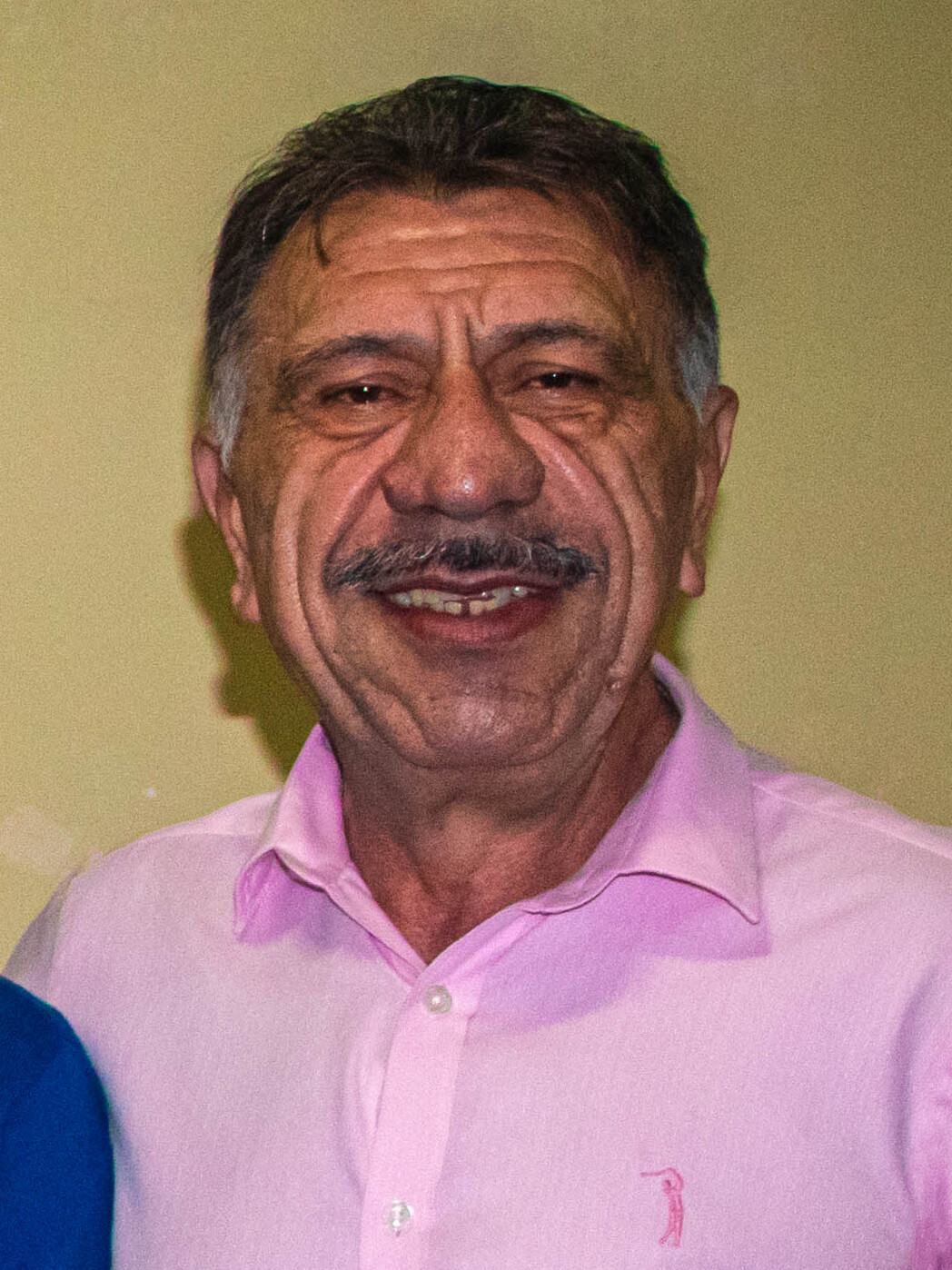
- Patriota in 2022

Member of the Legislative Assembly of Pernambuco
- In office 1 February 2023 – 17 September 2024

Personal details
- Born: José Coimbra Patriota Filho; 9 October 1960 Tabira, Pernambuco, Brazil
- Died: 17 September 2024 (aged 63) Recife, Pernambuco, Brazil
- Political party: PSB
- Occupation: Social worker

José Coimbra Patriota Filho (9 October 1960 – 17 September 2024) was a Brazilian social worker and politician. A member of the Brazilian Socialist Party, he served in the Legislative Assembly of Pernambuco from 2023 to 2024.

Patriota died of liver cancer in Recife, on 17 September 2024, at the age of 63.
