= Barbara Foley =

American literary scholar (born 1948)

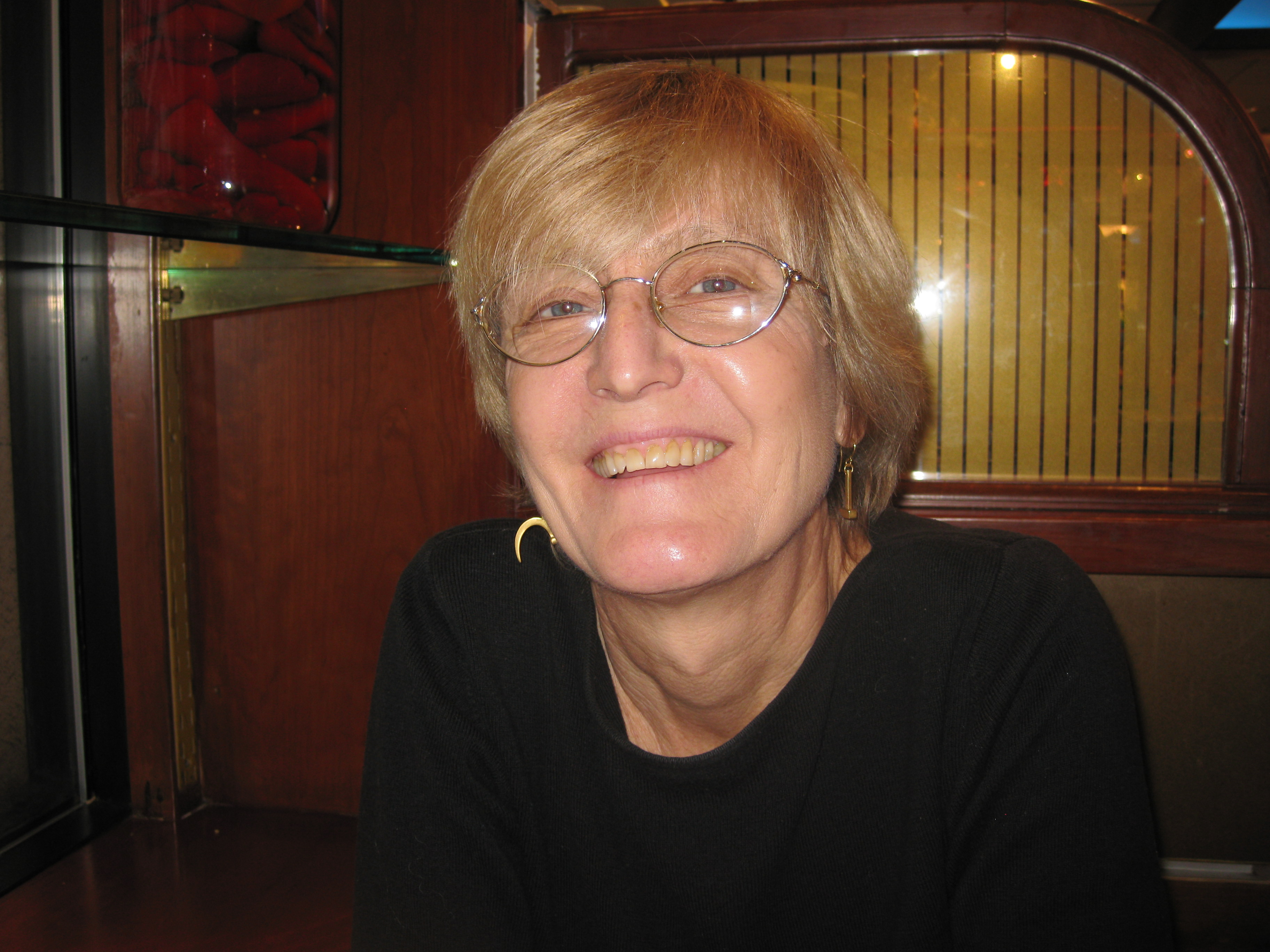
- Foley in 2015
- Born: Barbara Clare Foley; March 29, 1948 (age 78); New York City, U.S.
- Education: Radcliffe College (BA); University of Chicago (MA, PhD)
- Occupations: Literature professor; author
- Years active: 1976–2019

Barbara Clare Foley (born March 29, 1948) is an American literary scholar and a retired Professor of English at Rutgers University-Newark. She has focused her research and teaching on U.S. literary radicalism, African American literature, and Marxist criticism. The author of six books and over seventy scholarly articles, review essays, and book chapters, she has published on literary theory, academic politics, US proletarian literature, the Harlem Renaissance, and the writers Ralph Ellison and Jean Toomer. Throughout her career, her work has emphasized the centrality of antiracism and Marxist class analysis to both literary study and social movements.

== Life ==
Born in New York City, Foley attended Radcliffe College from 1965 to 1969, graduating Phi Beta Kappa and magna cum laude; she earned her Ph.D. with Honors from the University of Chicago in 1976. During the late 1960s and early 1970s, in the antiwar, antiracist, and feminist movements, she began what became an extended involvement with left-wing politics. She taught at the University of Wisconsin from 1976 to 1980, and at Northwestern University from 1980 to 1987. She was denied tenure by the Provost at Northwestern University on the grounds of "grave professional misconduct"—stemming from her participation in a 1985 campus demonstration against Adolfo Calero, a Nicaraguan contra leader- even though she had been approved for tenure by her department, the A&P Committee, and the Dean of the College of Arts and Sciences.

In 1987, the Modern Language Association (MLA) passed a resolution appealing to Northwestern University President Arnold Weber to overrule the Provost's decision and grant tenure to Foley. Following an appeal, Weber ultimately upheld the denial of tenure. When reflecting later on the incident, Foley said: "What did I learn from all this? That radical faculty, if they act on their beliefs, have no real protection. But that it is important to act on one's beliefs." From 1987 to 2019, she served on the faculty at Rutgers University-Newark.

Foley has been the recipient of awards for both teaching and scholar-activism at Rutgers University-Newark, as well of fellowships from the National Endowment for the Humanities and the American Council of Learned Societies. She was elected to the MLA Delegate Assembly four times, for a total of twelve years, as representative of Politics and the Profession; she served as the President of the MLA Radical Caucus from 2005 to 2017.

Since 2000, she has been on the Editorial Board and Manuscript Committee at the Marxist journal Science & Society, where she is currently Vice-President. She has lectured on American literature and Marxist theory in France and Cuba, as well as during four trips to China, where several of her works have been translated into Chinese. Since 1990 she has served as Chair of the NOW-NJ Combating Racism Task Force.

== Published works ==
Foley's first book, Telling the Truth: The Theory and Practice of Documentary Fiction (Cornell University Press, 1986), is a Marxist commentary on texts combining fact and fiction. Taking issue with post-structuralist and reader-response theories of discourse, Foley argues that fiction contains propositional content; she offers a historical materialist overview of the novel's changing modes of conveying cognition of the world beyond the text. Telling the Truth was described in a review in Modern Philology as proposing "a powerful theory for dealing with the assertions made by fictional texts.... This is one of those rare books that will change the very way we think about literature."

Radical Representations: Politics and Form in US Proletarian Fiction, 1929-1941 (Duke, 1993) reflects Foley's interest in Depression-era literary radicalism. Arguing against the Cold War paradigms that continue to shape scholarship on left-wing writing, Foley examines contemporaneous debates over art and propaganda, investigates the relationship between left politics and literary form, and proposes an anatomy of the modes of proletarian fiction. The reviewer for MELUS wrote that Foley "has written a superbly researched and argued book . . . that is a must read for anyone interested in gaining a better understanding of the difficult project of creating a radical culture sensitive to issues of race, class and gender in the effort to build an egalitarian society."

Foley's third book, Spectres of 1919: Class and Nation in the Making of the New Negro (Illinois, 2003), explores the radical origins of the Harlem Renaissance. Alain Locke's formulation of the New Negro as culture hero in his influential 1925 The New Negro: An Interpretation, Foley argues, was premised upon banishing the figure of the New Negro as social revolutionary that prevailed in the late 1910s and early 1920s. The reviewer for American Literature designated Spectres of 1919 "a carefully argued, nuanced presentation of the genesis of the Harlem Renaissance. Foley's breadth of knowledge in American radical history is impressive." In the Journal of American Studies, the book was described as "lucid and useful. ... A heavyweight intervention, it prompts significant rethinking of the ideological and representational strategies structuring the era."

In Wrestling with the Left: The Making of Ralph Ellison's Invisible Man (Duke, 2010), Foley shifts the focus of her scholarship to a detailed engagement with a single text. Here, she undertakes a reconstruction of the process by which Ellison composed, between 1945 and 1952, his celebrated novel Invisible Man. Her investigation of the thousands of pages of draft manuscript and notes yields the conclusion that the novel was the product of multiple reconceptualizations and revisions. Now viewed as a Cold War classic, Invisible Man was begun, she proposes, as a proletarian novel somewhat sympathetic with the left. The assessment appearing in African American Review asserted, "After Foley's analysis of the material in Ellison's drafts, one in fact gains an even greater appreciation for the richness and complexity of what remains one of the great works of American literature." The reviewer of Wrestling with the Left for Cultural Logic, noting Foley's treatment of politics and form, concluded that "Foley challenges not only prevailing views of Ellison and Invisible Man, and not only dominant views of early-to-mid-20th century U.S. history involving the Communist left (literary and otherwise), but. . . dominant conceptions of 'literature' and 'literary greatness' as such."

Foley's 2014 book, Jean Toomer: Race, Repression, and Revolution (Illinois, 2014), displays her growing interest in biography as a necessary component of Marxist criticism. Invoking hitherto unexplored portions of the Toomer archive and expanding upon Fredric Jameson's formulation of the political unconscious, Foley offers a new approach to both Toomer the man and Cane the book. Nathan Grant, Toomer scholar and editor of African American Review, wrote that "Barbara Foley's contribution to Toomer studies newly places him in the contexts of both early twentieth-century Left politics and 'New Negro' sensibility. Any assessment of the Harlem Renaissance is made all the richer by Foley's study, with which subsequent scholarship must contend." According to Charles Scruggs, co-author of Jean Toomer and the Terrors of American History (1998), "Barbara Foley has written a brilliant book on Toomer. I would go so far to say it is also the best researched book on Toomer that exists."

In Marxist Literary Criticism Today (2019), Foley focuses on matters of pedagogy. She claims that despite the inability of capitalism to meet the needs of the majority of the world's population, and the fact that people look to literature for insights into the relationship between consciousness and material reality, there had been no new general introductions to Marxist literary criticism since the books published by Terry Eagleton (Marxism and Literary Criticism) and Raymond Williams (Marxism and Literature) in the late 1970s. Filling this gap with a study attuned to the concerns of the twenty-first century, she lays out the key principles of Marxist theory (historical materialism, political economy, and ideology critique) essential to the study of literature. After examining the ways in which Marxist criticism both overlaps with and differs from other analytical approaches, she outlines principal debates that continue to shape the field of Marxist criticism. The book culminates in an extended study of a wide range of literary works—from the poetry of Matthew Arnold to E. L. James's Fifty Shades of Grey to the proletarian verse of Langston Hughes—that illustrate Marxism's distinct contribution to an understanding of the links between literature and society.

In addition to her book-length studies, Foley has published numerous articles, reviews, anthology chapters, and book introductions that reflect her literary and political interests. In journals such as Science & Society, Cultural Logic, Cultural Critique, Mediations, Biography, Rethinking Marxism, American Quarterly, The Minnesota Review, and Comparative Literature, she participated in debates over post-structuralism, deconstruction, Marxist theory, intersectionality, and the connections between race and class. She has sought to situate US writers in their historical and political context, as illustrated by her contributions to journals including American Literature, African American Review, American Literary History, Obsidian, Modern Fiction Studies, PMLA, Genre, and College Literature. In articles and interviews, she has also shown herself to be a student of developments in China.

== Bibliography ==
=== Selected articles ===
- Foley, Barbara (March 1978). "From U.S.A. to Ragtime: Notes on the Forms of Historical Consciousness in Modern Fiction". American Literature. 50 (1): 85–105. doi:10.2307/2925523. JSTOR 2925523.
- ———— (Summer 1979). "Review: Fact, Fiction, and 'Reality'". Contemporary Literature. 20 (3): 389–399. JSTOR 1208301.
- ———— (Fall 1979). "History, Fiction, and Satirical Form: The Example of Dos Passos' 1919". Genre. 12: 357–378.
- ———— (Spring 1990). "Women and the Left in the 1930s". American Literary History. 2 (1): 150–169. JSTOR 489816.
- ———— (May 1980). "History, Fiction, and the Ground between: The Uses of the Documentary Mode in Black Literature". PMLA. 95 (3): 389–403. doi:10.2307/461880. JSTOR 461880. S2CID 163539850.
- ———— (Fall 1980). "The Treatment of Time in The Big Money: An Examination of Ideology and Literary Form". Modern Fiction Studies. 26 (3): 447–467.
- ———— (Fall 1982). "Fact, Fiction, Fascism: Mimesis and Testimony in Holocaust Narrative". Comparative Literature. 34 (4): 330–360. doi:10.2307/1771153. JSTOR 1771153.
- ———— (Spring–Summer 1984). "The Politics of Deconstruction". Genre. 17: 113–34.
- ———— (Spring 1984). "From New Criticism to Deconstruction: The Example of Charles Feidelson's Symbolism and American Literature". American Quarterly. 36 (1): 44–64. doi:10.2307/2712838. JSTOR 2712838.
- ———— (1990). "Subversion and Oppositionality in the Academy". College Literature. 17 (2/3): 64–79.
- ———— (Spring 1990). "Marxism in the Post-Structuralist Moment: Some Notes on the Problem of Revising Marx". Cultural Critique. 15 (15): 5–37. doi:10.2307/1354179. JSTOR 1354179.
- ———— (Summer 1992). "Class". Rethinking Marxism. 5 (2): 117–28.
- ———— (September 1995). "'What's at Stake in the Culture Wars' review essay on Peter Shaw, Recovering American Literature; John Guillory, Cultural Capital: The Problem of Literary Canon Formation; and Gerald Graff, Beyond the Culture Wars: How Teaching the Conflicts Can Revitalize American Education". New England Quarterly. 68 (3): 458–579. doi:10.2307/366165. JSTOR 366165.
- ———— (Summer 1998). "Roads Taken and Not Taken: Anticommunism, Post-Marxism, and African American Literature". Cultural Logic. 1 (2). Archived from the original on August 2, 2011.
- ———— (Summer 1998). "Lepers in the Acropolis': Liberalism, Capitalism, and the Crisis in Academic Labor, review essay on Cary Nelson, Manifesto of a Tenured Radical, and Cary Nelson, ed., Will Teach for Food: Academic Labor in Crisis". Contemporary Literature. 39 (2): 317–336. doi:10.2307/1208989. JSTOR 1208989.
- ———— (March 2000). "From Wall Street to Astor Place: Historicizing Melville's Bartleby". American Literature. 72 (1): 87–116. doi:10.1215/00029831-72-1-87. S2CID 162272799.
- ———— (2002). "The Politics of Post-Positivist Realism". Cultural Logic. 4 (2). Archived from the original on March 31, 2012.
- ———— (Fall 2002). "Ten Propositions on the Role Played by Marxism in Working-Class Studies". Rethinking Marxism. 14: 28–31.
- ———— (Fall 2002). "From Situational Dialectics to Pseudo-Dialectics: Mao, Jiang, and Capitalist Transition". Cultural Logic. 5 (3). Archived from the original on October 13, 2008.
- ———— (2006). "Racism Redux: David Horowitz Then and Now". The Minnesota Review (67): 123–127. doi:10.1215/00265667-2006-67-123.
- ———— (October 2008). "Reviewed Work: Bold Plum: With the Guerrillas in China's War against Japan, by Hsiao Li Lindsay". Science & Society. 72 (4): 492–94. JSTOR 40404514.
- ———— (2009). "Rhetoric and Silence in Barack Obama's Dreams from My Father". Cultural Logic. Archived from the original on April 27, 2015.
- ———— (Fall–Winter 2010). "'A Dramatic Picture...of Woman from Feudalism to Fascism': Richard Wright's Unpublished Novel Black Hope". Obsidian. 11 (2): 43–54.
- ———— (Summer 2013). "The Color of Blood: John Brown, Jean Toomer, and the New Negro Movement". African American Review. 46 (2): 237–253. doi:10.1353/afa.2013.0071. S2CID 153981973.
- ———— (Fall 2013). "Biography and the Political Unconscious: Ellison, Toomer, Jameson, and the Politics of Symptomatic Reading". Biography. 36 (4): 649–71. doi:10.1353/bio.2013.0043. S2CID 154430795.
- ————; Kanishka, Choundhury (Fall 2013 – Spring 2014). "Paths to Revolution: A Commentary on Kevin Anderson's Marx at the Margins: On Nationalism, Ethnicity, and Non-Western Societies". Mediations. 27 (1, 2): 411–418.
- ———— (July 2014). "Left Politics and Literary History". Science & Society. 78 (3): 350–360. doi:10.1521/siso.2014.78.3.350.
- ————; Gardner, Peter (Winter 2017). "Retrospective Radicalism: Politics and History in Ernest Hemingway's A Farewell to Arms". College Literature: A Journal of Critical Literary Studies. 44 (1): 1–29.
- ———— (April 2018). "Intersectionality: A Marxist Critique". Science and Society. 82 (2): 269–275. doi:10.1521/siso.2018.82.2.269. S2CID 149273868.

=== Introductions and chapters ===
- Foley, Barbara (1995). "Introduction". Moscow Yankee. The Radical Novel Reconsidered. Urbana: University of Illinois Press. ISBN 978-0252064999. Archived from the original on August 24, 2000.
- ———— (2002). "Looking Backward, 2001-1969: Student Movements in the Era of 'Globalization'". In Kumar, Amitava (ed.). World Bank Literature. Minneapolis: University of Minnesota Press. pp. 26–39. ISBN 978-0816638369.
- ———— (2009). "The Proletarian Novel". In Matthews, John T. (ed.). A Companion to the Modern American Novel, 1900-1950. Malden, Massachusetts: Wiley-Blackwell. pp. 353–66. ISBN 978-0631206873.
- ———— (2019). "Racism". In Diamanti, Jeff; Pendakis, Andrew; Szeman, Imre (eds.). Bloomsbury Companion to Marx. London: Bloomsbury Academic. ISBN 978-1474278713. OCLC 1012346681.

=== Interviews ===
- Strickland, Ron (Spring 1998). "Interview with Barbara Foley". Mediations. 21: 58–66.
- Hancuff, Richard; O'Connor, Noreen (October 1999). "Theory Into Practice: An Interview with Barbara Foley". The Minnesota Review: 113–122.
- Parascondola, Leo (December 2000). "Interview with Barbara Foley". Louisville. Workplace: E-Journal of the MLA Graduate Student Caucus.
- Ramsey, Joseph (February 2008). "'Reading Forward' from the Left: An Interview with Barbara Foley". Reconstruction. 8 (1). Archived from the original on March 25, 2015.
- Foley, Barbara (April 2009). "Crossroads: China's Future under Debate: An Interview with Fengzhen Wang and Shaobo Xie". Science & Society. 73 (2). JSTOR 40404545.
- Bailes, Jon (June 18, 2019). "Barbara Foley 21st Century Marxist literary criticism". MR Online. Archived from the original on May 13, 2021.

=== Books ===
- Foley, Barbara (1986). Telling the Truth: The Theory and Practice of Documentary Fiction. Ithaca, New York: Cornell University Press. ISBN 978-0252028465.
- ———— (1993). Radical Representations: Politics and Form in US Proletarian Fiction, 1929–1941. Durham, North Carolina: Duke University Press. ISBN 978-0822313618.
- ———— (2003). Spectres of 1919: Class and Nation in the Making of the New Negro. Urbana: University of Illinois Press. ISBN 978-0252028465.
- ———— (2010). Wrestling with the Left: The Making of Ralph Ellison's Invisible Man. Durham, North Carolina: Duke University Press. ISBN 978-0822393276.
- ———— (2014). Jean Toomer: Race, Repression, and Revolution. Urbana: University of Illinois Press. ISBN 978-0252038440.
- ———— (2019). Marxist Literary Criticism Today. London: Pluto Press. ISBN 978-0745338842.
