= Floating signifier =

Signifier without a definite referent

In semiotics and discourse analysis, floating signifiers are signifiers, such as words or images, that can be interpreted in different ways and so do not have a clear, single referent. For example, the word "tree" is a signifier that references a tree. Although the term was developed in the mid-twentieth century, originating in Claude Lévi-Strauss's anthropological research, it is also frequently applied in contemporary scholarship. Floating signifiers are sometimes also referred to as empty signifiers, although several scholars argue that the terms mean different things. The term open signifier is sometimes used as a synonym due to the empty signifier's nature to "resist the constitution of any unitary meaning", enabling its ability to remain open to different meanings in different contexts.

== Definition ==
Daniel Chandler defines the term as "a signifier with a vague, highly variable, unspecifiable or non-existent signified". The concept of floating signifiers originates with Claude Lévi-Strauss, who identified cultural ideas like mana as "represent[ing] an undetermined quantity of signification, in itself void of meaning and thus apt to receive any meaning".

As such, a "floating signifier" may "mean different things to different people: they may stand for many or even any signifieds; they may mean whatever their interpreters want them to mean". Such a floating signifier—which is said to possess "symbolic value zero"—necessarily results to "allow symbolic thought to operate despite the contradiction inherent in it".

Roland Barthes, while not using the term "floating signifier" explicitly, referred specifically to non-linguistic signs as being so open to interpretation that they constituted a "floating chain of signifieds." Jacques Derrida also described the "freeplay" of signifiers, arguing that they are not fixed to their signifieds but point beyond themselves to other signifiers in an "indefinite referral of signifier to signified."

In Emancipation(s), Ernesto Laclau frames the empty signifier in the context of social interactions. For Laclau, the empty signifier is the hegemonic representative of a collection of various demands, constituting a chain of equivalence whose members are distinguished through a differential logic (as in elements exist only in their differences to one another) but combine through an equivalential one. This chain of unsatisfied demands create an unfulfilled totality, inside of which one signifier subordinates the rest and assumes representation of the rest via a hegemonic process. The signifiers "empty" versus "floating" are distinct conceptually yet in practice meld as explained by Laclau: "As we can see, the categories of ‘empty’ and ‘floating’ signifiers are structurally different. The first concerns the construction of a popular identity once the presence of a stable frontier is taken for granted; the second tries conceptually to apprehend the logic of the displacements of that frontier." In an interview in December 2013, Laclau clarified the distinction with an example:

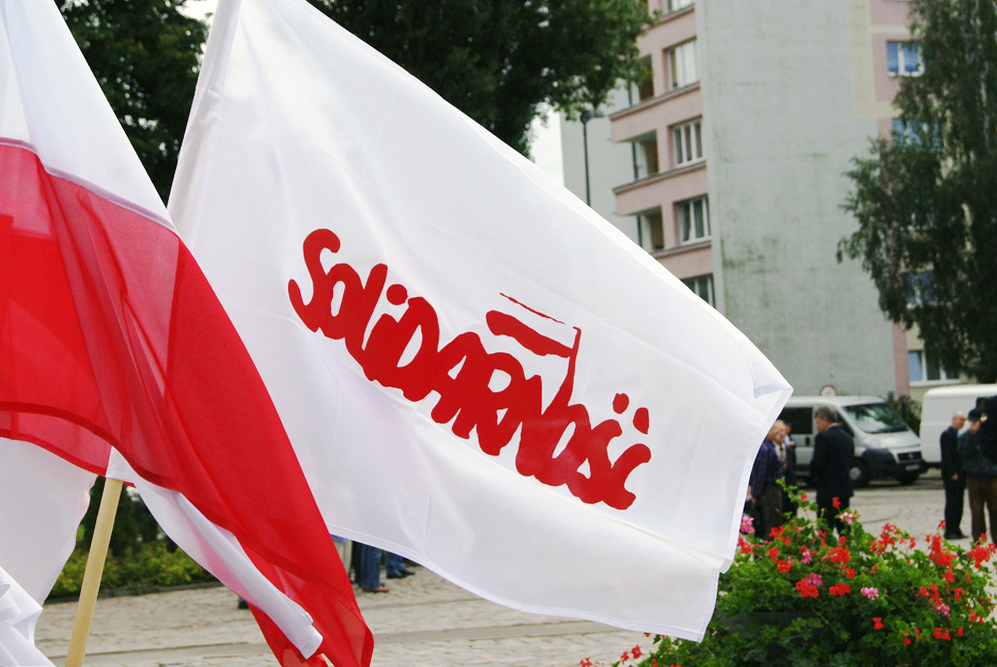
Solidarity flag displayed at the Monument to the Fallen Shipyard Workers, Gdańsk, Poland

Laclau exemplified an empty signifier with the case of the Solidarność movement led by Lech Walesa at the Lenin shipyards in Gdansk, Poland, in 1980. At the beginning, the demands of this movement were linked to a set of precise demands of the workers of the ship industry. However, they started to be employed in the context in which many other demands in different areas were also articulated. At the end, Solidarność became the signifier of something much broader. When this universality comes about, it cuts off the connection between the signifier and the signified. In the case of Solidarność, in the beginning it had a signifier but then, because the appeal increased too much, the reference to a particular signified was diluted. A floating signifier is different. It can be connected to different contexts, so the function of meaning therein is fully realized. Even when it is ambiguous, it is not empty. It fluctuates between different forms of articulation in different projects.

== Uses and examples ==
The notion of floating signifiers can be applied to concepts such as race and gender, as a way of asserting that the word is more concrete than the concept it describes, where the concept may not be stable, but the word is.

It is often applied to non-linguistic signs, such as the example of the Rorschach inkblot test. The concept is used in some more textual forms of postmodernism, which rejects the strict anchoring of particular signifiers to particular signifieds and argues against the concept that there are any ultimate determinable meanings to words or signs.

In his 2003 book City of Gold, David A. Westbrook refers to money as a "perpetually floating signifier" of pure potential, noting that "its promise to represent anything in particular is never fulfilled."

Ian Buchanan's A Dictionary of Critical Theory (published by Oxford University Press) gives the example that "Fredric Jameson suggests that the shark in the Jaws series of films is an empty signifier because it is susceptible to multiple and even contradictory interpretations, suggesting that it does not have a specific meaning itself, but functions primarily as a vehicle for absorbing meanings that viewers want to impose upon it."

A 2023 paper by Lucy Suchman stated that the term "AI" could be used as a floating signifier.

== See also ==
- Essentially contested concept
- Glittering generality
- The Symbolic
- Dangling pointer
- Dead metaphor

== Bibliography ==
- Buchanan, Ian (2018). A Dictionary of Critical Theory. Oxford University Press. ISBN 9780198794790.
- Kornak, Jacek (2015). "Judith Butler's Queer Conceptual Politics". Redescriptions: Political Thought, Conceptual History and Feminist Theory. 18 (1): 52. doi:10.7227/R.18.1.4.
- Laclau, Ernesto (2005). On Populist Reason. London/ Brooklyn, NY: Verso. ISBN 978-1-78873-133-1.
- Lévi-Strauss, Claude (1987) [1950]. Introduction to Marcel Mauss. Translated by Baker, Felicity. London: Routledge. ISBN 9780710090669.
- Moraes, Silvia Elisabeth (2014). "Global Citizenship as a Floating Signifier" (PDF). International Journal of Development Education and Global Learning. 6 (2). doi:10.18546/IJDEGL.06.2.03. ISSN 1756-526X.
- Westbrook, David A. (2003). City of Gold: An Apology for Global Capitalism in a Time of Discontent. Routledge. ISBN 0-415-94540-2.
