= Jeffrey T. Nealon =

American academic in literary and cultural studies

- Occupations: Writer and academic

Academic background
- Education: B.A., in English and Philosophy; M.A., in English; Ph.D., English
- Alma mater: Marquette University; Loyola University, Chicago

Jeffrey T. Nealon is an American author and an academic, working in literary and cultural studies. He is the Edwin Erle Sparks Professor of English and Philosophy in the Department of English at Pennsylvania State University.

Nealon has authored books and journal articles on contemporary literary and cultural theory. His articles have been published in journals including the Critical Inquiry, Cultural Critique, Modern Fiction Studies, and Postmodern Culture. Some of his other notable books include Double Reading: Postmodernism after Deconstruction, Foucault Beyond Foucault: Power and Its Intensifications since 1984, and Post-Postmodernism: or, The Cultural Logic of Just-in-Time Capitalism.

== Education ==
Nealon completed his B.A. in English and Philosophy from Marquette University in 1985. He then attended Loyola University Chicago from 1986 to 1991, earning both an M.A. and a Ph.D. in English.

== Career ==
Nealon started his career as an Assistant Professor of English at the Pennsylvania State University in 1992. In 1997, he was appointed Associate Professor of English and in 2001, was promoted to Professor of English, a position he retained until 2008. Subsequently, he was appointed as the Liberal Arts Research Professor of English and Philosophy from 2008 to 2014. Additionally, between 2002 and 2005, he was the Director of Graduate Studies, English Department at The Pennsylvania State University and since 1993, has been a member of the Penn State Social Thought Program. Moreover, since 2014, he is the Edwin Erle Sparks Professor of English and Philosophy at the Pennsylvania State University.

== Works ==
Nealon's first book on literary criticism, Double Reading: Postmodernism after Deconstruction, was published in 1993 and examined the continued relevance of deconstruction in postmodernist critical debates. Centered on Derrida's notion of 'double reading,' the book explored how initial interpretations were supplemented—and often undermined—by a secondary reading, challenging conventional academic methodologies. In 1998, he authored Alterity Politics: Ethics and Performative Subjectivity, in which he argued for an ethical, action-based understanding of community that embraces difference through affirmative response. In this book, he also engaged with key theorists and cultural figures, such as Vincent van Gogh and William S. Burroughs, to explore identity and performative subjectivity in literary theory, cultural studies, and philosophy.

Nealon's next book, The Theory Toolbox: Critical Concepts for the Humanities, Arts, and Social Sciences, published in 2003, was a textbook on cultural and social theory that Heidi Renate Ballard described as "offering a fresh, practical approach to theoretical constructs". He then wrote Foucault Beyond Foucault: Power and Its Intensifications Since 1984 in 2008, where he reinterpreted Foucault's later work, emphasizing the ongoing intensification of power and its relevance in contemporary post-Marxist economic contexts. The book was characterized by Todd May in Notre Dame Philosophical Reviews as "a fascinating interpretation of Foucault, one that brings to light to his previously neglected elements of thought".

In 2012, Nealon published Post-Postmodernism; or, The Cultural Logic of Just-in-Time Capitalism, which argued that rather than moving beyond postmodernism, modern culture has witnessed an intensification of postmodern capitalism. The book was praised by the Helen Darby in Textual Practice as "well-structured, lucid, and a timely and insightful analysis of our current cultural logic." Subsequently, in 2016, he authored Plant Theory: Biopower and Vegetable Life, which critically examined contemporary biopower theories and argued that their focus on animals, rather than plants, might reinforce humanist biopower rather than dismantle it. Later, in 2018, he authored I'm Not Like Everybody Else: Biopolitics, Neoliberalism, and American Popular Music, in which he argued that popular music's values of authenticity have been repurposed as central organizing principles rather than as sites of resistance. According to the book, this requires a rethinking of musical opposition in an era where attention capitalism has shaped its function more than mainstream rejection.

Nealon's next book, Fates of the Performative: From the Linguistic Turn to the New Materialism was published in 2021, wherein he examined the continued power of performative theory in contemporary thought. Tracing its evolution from speech-act theory to its intersections with deconstruction, feminism, and new materialism, he explored what remained vital in the performative amidst neoliberal ascendency and emerging theoretical paradigms. The book was described by Bill Brown in American Literary History as "irreverent, funny, and fast-paced". In 2022, he authored Elegy for Literature, arguing that the academic study of literature required an elegy because literature, as an autonomous object of inquiry, no longer existed. The book was reviewed by Daniel O'Hara in American Book Review as "a scathing critique of the profession of literary study".

== Bibliography ==
=== Books ===
- 1993 – Double Reading: Postmodernism after Deconstruction ISBN 9780801428531
- 1998 – Alterity Politics: Ethics and Performative Subjectivity ISBN 0822321459
- 2003 – The Theory Toolbox: Critical Concepts for the Humanities, Arts, & Social Sciences with Susan Searls Giroux ISBN 9780742570504
- 2008 – Foucault Beyond Foucault: Power and Its Intensifications Since 1984 ISBN 9780804757027
- 2012 – Post-Postmodernism; or, The Cultural Logic of Just-in-Time Capitalism ISBN 9780804781459
- 2015 – Plant Theory: Biopower and Vegetable Life ISBN 0804796750
- 2018 – I’m Not Like Everybody Else: Biopolitics, Neoliberalism, and American Popular Music ISBN 9781496208651
- 2021 – Fates of the Performative: From the Linguistic Turn to the New Materialism ISBN 1517910854
- 2022 – Elegy for Literature ISBN 9781839983955
