= March 29 =

March 29 this year in various calendars
- Sunday, 29 March 2026
Akan	Monokwasi
Armenian	12 Ahekani 1475
Aztec	Huei Tecuilhuitl 18, 1 Miquiztli
Babylonian	9 Adaru, 2336 SE
Balinese pawukon	Luang, Pepet, Kajeng, Laba, Keliwon, Maulu, Redite of Watugunung, Indra, Gigis, Duka
Bengali	15 Chaitro, BS 1432
Chinese	Yang Water Tiger・Star Mansion; Fire Horse Year, Month 2, Day 11 (Chunfen, 7 days until Qingming)
Common Era	29 March 2026 CE
Coptic	20 Paremhat, AM 1742
Egyptian	17 Mesori, 2774 NE
Ethiopian	20 Magābit, 2018 Amätä Məhrät
French Republican	Décade I, Nonidi de Germinal de l'Année 234 de la République
Gregorian	29 March, AD 2026
Hebrew	11 Nisan, AM 5786
Hindu	Āśleṣā・Dhṛti; Solar: 16 Caitra, 1947 SE; Lunisolar: Ekādaśī, Śukla pakṣa of Caitra, 2083 VE; Rāudra・5126 KY・1,872,663
Icelandic	Sunnudagur, 6 Einmánuður 2025
Islamic	10 Shawwal, AH 1447 (using tabular method)
ISO week date	2026-W13-7
Japanese	11 Kisaragi, Reiwa 8 (Shunbun, 7 days until Seimei)
Julian	16 March, AD 2026 (AM 7534)
Julian day	2461129
Korean	11 Tokkidal, 4359 DE
Maya	13.0.13.8.6; 4 Uayeb, 1 Cimi
Roman	ante diem XVII Kalendas Apriles, MMDCCLXXIX AUC
Solar Hijri	9 Farvardin, SH 1405
Tibetan	11 dbo, me pho rta 2153 or 1772 or 1000

<<	March					>>
Su	Mo	Tu	We	Th	Fr	Sa
1	2	3	4	5	6	7
8	9	10	11	12	13	14
15	16	17	18	19	20	21
22	23	24	25	26	27	28
29	30	31
2026

March 29 in recent years
2026 (Sunday)
2025 (Saturday)
2024 (Friday)
2023 (Wednesday)
2022 (Tuesday)
2021 (Monday)
2020 (Sunday)
2019 (Friday)
2018 (Thursday)
2017 (Wednesday)

March 29 is the 88th day of the year (89th in leap years) in the Gregorian calendar; 277 days remain until the end of the year.

== Events ==
=== Pre-1600 ===
- 1139 – Pope Innocent II issues the bull Omne datum optimum in which he endorses the Knights Templar and approves the Templar Rule.
- 1430 – The Ottoman Empire under Murad II captures Thessalonica from the Republic of Venice.
- 1461 – Battle of Towton: Edward of York defeats Queen Margaret to become King Edward IV of England, bringing a temporary stop to the Wars of the Roses.
- 1549 – The city of Salvador, Bahia, the first capital of Brazil, is founded.

=== 1601–1900 ===
- 1632 – Treaty of Saint-Germain is signed returning Quebec to French control after the English had seized it in 1629.
- 1792 – King Gustav III of Sweden dies after being shot in the back at a midnight masquerade ball at Stockholm's Royal Opera 13 days earlier.
- 1806 – Construction is authorized of the Great National Pike, better known as the Cumberland Road, becoming the first United States federal highway.
- 1809 – King Gustav IV Adolf of Sweden abdicates after a coup d'état.
- 1809 – At the Diet of Porvoo, Finland's four Estates pledge allegiance to Alexander I of Russia, commencing the secession of the Grand Duchy of Finland from Sweden.
- 1847 – Mexican–American War: United States forces led by General Winfield Scott take Veracruz after a siege.
- 1849 – The United Kingdom annexes the Punjab.
- 1857 – Sepoy Mangal Pandey of the 34th Regiment, Bengal Native Infantry mutinies against the East India Company's rule in India and inspires the protracted Indian Rebellion of 1857, also known as the Sepoy Mutiny.
- 1867 – Queen Victoria gives Royal Assent to the British North America Act which establishes Canada on July 1.
- 1871 – Royal Albert Hall is opened by Queen Victoria.
- 1879 – Anglo-Zulu War: Battle of Kambula: British forces defeat 20,000 Zulus.
- 1882 – The Knights of Columbus is established.

=== 1901–present ===
- 1927 – Sunbeam 1000hp breaks the land speed record at Daytona Beach, Florida.
- 1936 – The 1936 German parliamentary election and referendum seeks approval for the recent remilitarization of the Rhineland.
- 1941 – The North American Regional Broadcasting Agreement goes into effect at 03:00 local time.
- 1941 – World War II: British Royal Navy and Royal Australian Navy forces defeat those of the Italian Regia Marina off the Peloponnesian coast of Greece in the Battle of Cape Matapan.
- 1942 – The Bombing of Lübeck in World War II is the first major success for the RAF Bomber Command against Germany and a German city.
- 1947 – The Malagasy Uprising against French colonial rule begins in Madagascar.
- 1951 – Julius and Ethel Rosenberg are convicted of conspiracy to commit espionage.
- 1951 – Hypnosis murders in Copenhagen.
- 1957 – The New York, Ontario and Western Railway makes its final run, the first major U.S. railroad to be abandoned in its entirety.
- 1961 – The Twenty-third Amendment to the United States Constitution is ratified, allowing residents of Washington, D.C., to vote in presidential elections.
- 1962 – Arturo Frondizi, the president of Argentina, is overthrown in a military coup by Argentina's armed forces, ending an 11 1/2 day constitutional crisis.
- 1968 – The funeral of Yuri Gagarin, the first man in space, begins in Moscow, with thousands of people in attendance.
- 1971 – My Lai massacre: Lieutenant William Calley is convicted of premeditated murder and sentenced to life in prison.
- 1973 – Vietnam War: The last United States combat soldiers leave South Vietnam.
- 1973 – Operation Barrel Roll, a covert American bombing campaign in Laos to stop communist infiltration of South Vietnam, ends.
- 1974 – NASA's Mariner 10 becomes the first space probe to fly by Mercury.
- 1974 – The Terracotta Army is discovered in Shaanxi province, China.
- 1979 – Quebecair Flight 255 crashes after takeoff from Québec City Jean Lesage International Airport in Quebec City, killing 17.
- 1982 – The Canada Act 1982 receives the Royal Assent from Queen Elizabeth II, setting the stage for the Queen of Canada to proclaim the Constitution Act, 1982.
- 1984 – The Baltimore Colts load their possessions onto fifteen Mayflower moving trucks in the early morning hours and transfer their operations to Indianapolis.
- 1990 – The Czechoslovak parliament is unable to reach an agreement on what to call the country after the fall of Communism, sparking the so-called Hyphen War.
- 1999 – The Dow Jones Industrial Average closes above the 10,000 mark (10,006.78) for the first time, during the height of the dot-com bubble.
- 1999 – A magnitude 6.8 earthquake in India strikes the Chamoli district in Uttar Pradesh, killing 103.
- 2001 – A Gulfstream III crashes on approach to Aspen/Pitkin County Airport in Aspen, Colorado. All 18 people on board are killed.
- 2002 – In reaction to the Passover massacre two days prior, Israel launches Operation Defensive Shield against Palestinian militants, its largest military operation in the West Bank since the 1967 Six-Day War.
- 2004 – Bulgaria, Estonia, Latvia, Lithuania, Romania, Slovakia, and Slovenia join NATO as full members.
- 2004 – The Council on Tall Buildings and Urban Habitat certifies Taipei 101 as the world's tallest building, based on the building having been topped out on 1 July 2003, even though the building was not completed until 31 December 2004.
- 2010 – Two suicide bombers hit the Moscow Metro system at the peak of the morning rush hour, killing 40.
- 2013 – At least 36 people are killed when a 16-floor building collapses in the commercial capital Dar es Salaam, Tanzania.
- 2014 – The first same-sex marriages in England and Wales are performed.
- 2015 – Air Canada Flight 624 skids off the runway at Halifax Stanfield International Airport, after arriving from Toronto shortly past midnight. All 133 passengers and five crews on board survive, with 23 treated for minor injuries.
- 2017 – Prime Minister Theresa May invokes Article 50 of the Treaty on European Union, formally beginning the United Kingdom's withdrawal from the European Union.
- 2021 – The ship Ever Given is dislodged from the Suez Canal.

== Births ==
=== Pre-1600 ===
- 1187 – Arthur I, Duke of Brittany, grandson of King Henry II of England (died 1203)
- 1561 – Santorio Santorio, Italian biologist (died 1636)
- 1584 – Ferdinando Fairfax, 2nd Lord Fairfax of Cameron, English general and politician (died 1648)

=== 1601–1900 ===
- 1602 – John Lightfoot, English priest, scholar, and academic (died 1675)
- 1713 – John Ponsonby, Irish politician (died 1789)
- 1735 – Johann Karl August Musäus, German author (died 1787)
- 1747 – Johann Wilhelm Hässler, German pianist and composer (died 1822)
- 1769 – Jean-de-Dieu Soult, French general and politician, 12th Prime Minister of France (died 1851)
- 1780 – Jørgen Jørgensen, Danish adventurer (died 1841)
- 1790 – John Tyler, American lawyer and politician, 10th President of the United States (died 1862)
- 1799 – Edward Smith-Stanley, 14th Earl of Derby, English politician, Prime Minister of the United Kingdom (died 1869)
- 1802 – Johann Moritz Rugendas, German landscape painter (died 1858)
- 1824 – Ludwig Büchner, German physiologist, physician, and philosopher (died 1899)
- 1826 – Wilhelm Liebknecht, German journalist and politician (died 1900)
- 1853 – Elihu Thomson, English-American engineer and inventor (died 1937)
- 1860 – William Benham, New Zealand zoologist (died 1950)
- 1862 – Adolfo Müller-Ury, Swiss-American painter (died 1947)
- 1863 – Walter James, Australian politician, 5th Premier of Western Australia (died 1943)
- 1867 – Cy Young, American baseball player and manager (died 1955)
- 1869 – Edwin Lutyens, British architect (died 1944)
- 1871 – Tom Hayward, English cricketer (died 1939)
- 1872 – Hal Colebatch, English-Australian politician, 12th Premier of Western Australia (died 1953)
- 1873 – Tullio Levi-Civita, Italian mathematician and academic (died 1941)
- 1874 – Lou Henry Hoover, American philanthropist and geologist, 33rd First Lady of the United States (died 1944)
- 1883 – Donald Van Slyke, Dutch-American biochemist (died 1971)
- 1885 – Dezső Kosztolányi, Hungarian author and poet (died 1936)
- 1889 – Warner Baxter, American actor (died 1951)
- 1889 – Howard Lindsay, American producer, playwright, librettist, director and actor (died 1968)
- 1890 – Harold Spencer Jones, English astronomer (died 1960)
- 1891 – Yvan Goll, French-German poet and playwright (died 1950)
- 1892 – József Mindszenty, Hungarian cardinal (died 1975)
- 1895 – Ernst Jünger, German philosopher and author (died 1998)
- 1896 – Wilhelm Ackermann, German mathematician (died 1962)
- 1899 – Lavrentiy Beria, Georgian-Russian general and politician (died 1953)
- 1900 – John McEwen, Australian farmer and politician, 18th Prime Minister of Australia (died 1980)
- 1900 – Charles Sutherland Elton, English zoologist and animal ecologist (died 1991)

=== 1901–present ===
- 1902 – Marcel Aymé, French author, playwright, and screenwriter (died 1967)
- 1902 – William Walton, English composer (died 1983)
- 1903 – Douglas Harkness, Canadian colonel and politician, Canadian Minister of National Defence (died 1999)
- 1907 – Braguinha, Brazilian singer-songwriter and producer (died 2006)
- 1908 – Arthur O'Connell, American actor (died 1981)
- 1908 – Dennis O'Keefe, American actor and screenwriter (died 1968)
- 1909 – Moon Mullican, American singer-songwriter and pianist (died 1967)
- 1912 – Hanna Reitsch, German soldier and pilot (died 1979)
- 1913 – Phil Foster, American actor (died 1985)
- 1913 – Jack Jones, British trade union leader, General Secretary of the Transport and General Workers' Union (died 2009)
- 1914 – Chapman Pincher, Indian-English historian, journalist, and author (died 2014)
- 1916 – Peter Geach, English philosopher and academic (died 2013)
- 1916 – Eugene McCarthy, American poet and politician (died 2005)
- 1917 – Tommy Holmes, American baseball player (died 2008)
- 1917 – Ieuan Maddock, Welsh scientist and nuclear researcher (died 1988)
- 1918 – Pearl Bailey, American actress and singer (died 1990)
- 1918 – Lê Văn Thiêm, Vietnamese mathematician and academic (died 1991)
- 1918 – Sam Walton, American businessman, founded Walmart and Sam's Club (died 1992)
- 1919 – Eileen Heckart, American actress (died 2001)
- 1920 – John M. Belk, American businessman and politician (died 2007)
- 1920 – Clarke Fraser, American-Canadian geneticist and academic (died 2014)
- 1920 – Pierre Moinot, French author (died 2007)
- 1920 – Theodore Trautwein, American lawyer and judge (died 2000)
- 1921 – Sam Loxton, Australian cricketer, footballer, and politician (died 2011)
- 1923 – Geoff Duke, English-Manx motorcycle racer (died 2015)
- 1923 – Betty Binns Fletcher, American lawyer and judge (died 2012)
- 1926 – Vladimir Bolotin, Russian physicist (died 2008)
- 1927 – Martin Fleischmann, British chemist (died 2012)
- 1927 – John McLaughlin, American journalist and producer (died 2016)
- 1927 – John Vane, English pharmacologist and academic, Nobel Prize laureate (died 2004)
- 1928 – Romesh Bhandari, Pakistani-Indian politician, 13th Foreign Secretary of India (died 2013)
- 1928 – Keith Botsford, Belgian-American journalist, author, and academic (died 2018)
- 1928 – Vincent Gigante, American boxer and mobster (died 2005)
- 1929 – Sheila Kitzinger, English activist, author, and academic (died 2015)
- 1929 – Richard Lewontin, American biologist, geneticist, and academic (died 2021)
- 1929 – Lennart Meri, Estonian director and politician, 2nd President of Estonia (died 2006)
- 1929 – Utpal Dutt, Indian actor, director and playwright (died 1993)
- 1930 – Anerood Jugnauth, Mauritian lawyer and politician, 4th President of Mauritius (died 2021)
- 1931 – Aleksei Gubarev, Russian general, pilot and cosmonaut (died 2015)
- 1931 – Norman Tebbit, English journalist and politician, Chancellor of the Duchy of Lancaster (died 2025)
- 1935 – Ruby Murray, Northern Irish singer (died 1996)
- 1936 – Richard Rodney Bennett, English-American composer and educator (died 2012)
- 1936 – John A. Durkin, American lawyer and politician (died 2012)
- 1936 – Joseph P. Teasdale, American lawyer and politician, 48th Governor of Missouri (died 2014)
- 1937 – Roberto Chabet, Filipino painter and sculptor (died 2013)
- 1937 – Smarck Michel, Haitian businessman and politician, 6th Prime Minister of Haiti (died 2012)
- 1937 – Gordon Milne, English footballer
- 1939 – Roland Arnall, French-American businessman and diplomat, 63rd United States Ambassador to the Netherlands (died 2008)
- 1939 – Hanumant Singh, Indian cricketer (died 2006)
- 1940 – Ray Davis, American bass singer (died 2005)
- 1942 – Scott Wilson, American actor (died 2018)
- 1943 – John Major, English banker and politician, Prime Minister of the United Kingdom
- 1943 – Vangelis, Greek keyboard player and songwriter (died 2022)
- 1943 – Eric Idle, English actor, comedian, musician and writer
- 1945 – Speedy Keen, English singer-songwriter, keyboard player, and producer (died 2002)
- 1946 – Billy Thorpe, English-Australian singer-songwriter, guitarist, and producer (died 2007)
- 1947 – Frank Bowe, American academic (died 2007)
- 1947 – Robert Gordon, American singer and actor (died 2022)
- 1948 – Barbara Clare Foley, American author and educator
- 1949 – Michael Brecker, American saxophonist and composer (died 2007)
- 1949 – Joe Ehrmann, American football player and writer
- 1949 – Israel Finkelstein, Israeli archaeologist and professor
- 1949 – Dave Greenfield, English musician (died 2020)
- 1949 – Pauline Marois, Canadian social worker and politician, 30th Premier of Quebec
- 1949 – John Spenkelink, American murderer (died 1979)
- 1950 – Mory Kanté, Guinean vocalist (died 2020)
- 1951 – David Cheriton, Canadian computer scientist, mathematician and businessman
- 1951 – William Clarke, American harmonica player (died 1996)
- 1951 – Roger Myerson, American economist and professor
- 1951 – Nick Ut, Vietnamese-American photographer
- 1952 – Jo-Ann Mapson, American author
- 1952 – Teófilo Stevenson, Cuban boxer and engineer (died 2012)
- 1952 – Bola Tinubu, Nigerian politician, President-elect of Nigeria
- 1952 – Alec Wilkinson, American writer
- 1954 – Mario Clark, American football player
- 1954 – Martha A. Sandweiss, American historian
- 1954 – Suzanna Sherry, American legal scholar
- 1954 – Evelyn C. White, American writer and editor
- 1955 – Earl Campbell, American football player
- 1955 – Gillian Conoley, American poet
- 1955 – Brendan Gleeson, Irish actor
- 1955 – Marina Sirtis, British-American actress
- 1956 – Patty Donahue, American singer (died 1996)
- 1956 – Mary Gentle, English author
- 1956 – William Gurstelle, American writer and inventor
- 1956 – Ted Staunton, Canadian author
- 1956 – Kurt Thomas, American gymnast (died 2020)
- 1957 – Elizabeth Hand, American author
- 1957 – Mark Hudson, British writer, journalist and art critic
- 1957 – Christopher Lambert, American-French actor
- 1957 – Kathryn Tanner, American theologian
- 1958 – Travis Childers, American businessman and politician
- 1958 – Nouriel Roubini, Iranian-American economic consultant, economist and writer
- 1959 – Brad McCrimmon, Canadian ice hockey player and coach (died 2011)
- 1960 – Jo Nesbø, Norwegian writer, musician and football player
- 1961 – Todd G. Buchholz, American economist and author
- 1961 – Helen Humphreys, Canadian poet and novelist
- 1961 – Amy Sedaris, American actress and comedian
- 1961 – Michael Winterbottom, English director and producer
- 1962 – Billy Beane, American baseball player and manager
- 1962 – Igor Klebanov, Ukrainian-American theoretical physicist
- 1962 – Kirk Triplett, American golfer
- 1963 – Padraic Kenney, American writer, historian and educator
- 1964 – Catherine Cortez Masto, American attorney and politician
- 1964 – Elle Macpherson, Australian model and actress
- 1965 – Todd F. Davis, American poet and critic
- 1965 – Ayun Halliday, American writer and actor
- 1965 – Brooks Hansen, American novelist, screenwriter and illustrator
- 1965 – Maia Szalavitz, American journalist and author
- 1965 – Bradford Tatum, American actor
- 1966 – Dwayne Harper, American football player
- 1967 – Michel Hazanavicius, French director, producer, and screenwriter
- 1967 – Brian Jordan, American baseball player and sportscaster
- 1967 – Edmundo Paz Soldán, Bolivian writer
- 1968 – Chris Calloway, American football player
- 1968 – Lucy Lawless, New Zealand actress
- 1969 – Ted Lieu, American politician and AFRC colonel
- 1969 – Jimmy Spencer, American football player and coach
- 1970 – J. A. Konrath, American author
- 1971 – Robert Gibbs, American political adviser, 28th White House Press Secretary
- 1971 – Lara Logan, South African television and radio journalist and war correspondent
- 1971 – Hidetoshi Nishijima, Japanese actor
- 1972 – Ernest Cline, American novelist, poet and screenwriter
- 1972 – Stina Leicht, American author
- 1972 – Priti Patel, British Indian politician, Secretary of State for the Home Department
- 1973 – Marc Overmars, Dutch footballer and coach
- 1974 – Alex Cuba, Cuban-Canadian singer-songwriter
- 1976 – Jennifer Capriati, American tennis player
- 1977 – Nina Riggs, American writer and poet (died 2017)
- 1978 – Ian Holding, Zimbabwean writer
- 1979 – Luis Ortiz, Cuban boxer
- 1980 – Hamzah bin Hussein, Jordanian prince
- 1980 – Molly Brodak, American poet and writer (died 2020)
- 1980 – Chris D'Elia, American stand-up comedian, actor and writer
- 1980 – Bill Demong, American skier
- 1981 – Jasmine Crockett, American attorney and politician
- 1981 – Megan Hilty, American actress and singer
- 1981 – PJ Morton, American musician, singer, songwriter and record producer
- 1981 – Jlloyd Samuel, Trinidadian footballer (died 2018)
- 1983 – Efstathios Aloneftis, Greek-Cypriot footballer
- 1983 – Chokwe Antar Lumumba, American attorney, activist and politician
- 1985 – Fernando Amorebieta, Venezuelan footballer
- 1986 – Sylvan Ebanks-Blake, English footballer
- 1986 – Lucas Elliot Eberl, American actor and director
- 1989 – James Tomkins, English footballer
- 1990 – Lyle Taylor, English footballer
- 1991 – Irene, South Korean idol, actress and television host
- 1991 – N'Golo Kanté, French footballer
- 1993 – Thorgan Hazard, Belgian footballer
- 1994 – Jung Jae-won, South Korean rapper, singer-songwriter, and actor
- 1994 – Matt Olson, American baseball player
- 1994 – Tom Wilson, Canadian ice hockey player
- 1996 – Wade Baldwin IV, American basketball player
- 2004 – Kim Ju-chan, South Korean footballer

== Deaths ==
=== Pre-1600 ===
- 500 – Gwynllyw, Welsh king and religious figure
- 1058 – Pope Stephen IX (born 1020)
- 1461 – Henry Percy, 3rd Earl of Northumberland, English politician (born 1421)
- 1461 – Lionel Welles, 6th Baron Welles (c. 1406)

=== 1601–1900 ===
- 1628 – Tobias Matthew, English archbishop and academic (born 1546)
- 1629 – Jacob de Gheyn II, Dutch painter and engraver (born 1565)
- 1697 – Nicolaus Bruhns, Danish-German organist, violinist, and composer (born 1665)
- 1703 – George Frederick II, Margrave of Brandenburg-Ansbach, (born 1678)
- 1751 – Thomas Coram, English captain and philanthropist, founded Foundling Hospital (born 1668)
- 1772 – Emanuel Swedenborg, Swedish astronomer, philosopher, and theologian (born 1688)
- 1777 – Johann Heinrich Pott, Prussian physician and chemist (born 1692)
- 1788 – Charles Wesley, English missionary and poet (born 1707)
- 1792 – Gustav III, Swedish king (born 1746)
- 1796 – François de Charette, French military officer and politician (born 1763)
- 1800 – Marc René, marquis de Montalembert, French general and engineer (born 1714)
- 1803 – Gottfried van Swieten, Dutch-Austrian librarian and diplomat (born 1733)
- 1822 – Johann Wilhelm Hässler, German pianist and composer (born 1747)
- 1824 – Hans Nielsen Hauge, Norwegian lay minister, social reformer and author (born 1771)
- 1826 – Johann Heinrich Voss, German poet, translator and academic (born 1751)
- 1830 – James Rennell, English geographer, historian and oceanography pioneer (born 1742)
- 1848 – John Jacob Astor, German-American businessman (born 1763)
- 1866 – John Keble, English priest and poet (born 1792)
- 1888 – Charles-Valentin Alkan, French pianist and composer (born 1813)
- 1891 – Georges Seurat, French painter (born 1859)

=== 1901–present ===
- 1903 – Gustavus Franklin Swift, American business executive (born 1839)
- 1906 – Slava Raškaj, Croatian painter (born 1878)
- 1911 – Alexandre Guilmant, French organist and composer (born 1837)
- 1912 – Henry Robertson Bowers, Scottish lieutenant and explorer (born 1883)
- 1912 – Robert Falcon Scott, English lieutenant and explorer (born 1868)
- 1912 – Edward Adrian Wilson, English physician and explorer (born 1872)
- 1915 – William Wallace Denslow, American illustrator and caricaturist (born 1856)
- 1921 – John Burroughs, American naturalist and nature essayist (born 1837)
- 1924 – Charles Villiers Stanford, Irish composer and conductor (born 1852)
- 1934 – Otto Hermann Kahn, German-American banker and philanthropist (born 1867)
- 1937 – Karol Szymanowski, Polish pianist and composer (born 1882)
- 1940 – Alexander Obolensky, Russian-English rugby player and soldier (born 1916)
- 1948 – Harry Price, English parapsychologist and author (born 1881)
- 1953 – Väinö Kivisalo, Finnish politician (born 1882)
- 1953 – Arthur Fields, Jewish-American singer and composer (born 1888)
- 1957 – Joyce Cary, Anglo-Irish novelist (born 1888)
- 1959 – Barthélemy Boganda, African priest and politician, 1st Prime Minister of the Central African Republic (born 1910)
- 1963 – Gaspard Fauteux, Canadian dentist and politician, 19th Lieutenant Governor of Quebec (born 1898)
- 1963 – Frances Jenkins Olcott, American author and librarian (born 1872)
- 1966 – Stylianos Gonatas, Greek Army officer and Prime Minister of Greece (born 1876)
- 1970 – Anna Louise Strong, American journalist and author (born 1885)
- 1971 – Dhirendranath Datta, Pakistani lawyer and politician (born 1886)
- 1972 – J. Arthur Rank, English businessman, founded Rank Organisation (born 1888)
- 1979 – Nikos Petzaropoulos, Greece footballer (born 1927)
- 1981 – Eric Williams, Trinidadian historian and politician, 1st Prime Minister of Trinidad and Tobago (born 1911)
- 1982 – Walter Hallstein, German academic and politician, 1st President of the European Commission (born 1901)
- 1982 – Frederick George Mann, British organic chemist (born 1897)
- 1982 – Carl Orff, German composer and educator (born 1895)
- 1982 – Nathan Farragut Twining, American general (born 1897)
- 1985 – Luther Terry, American physician and academic, 9th Surgeon General of the United States (born 1911)
- 1985 – Janet Watson, British geologist (born 1923)
- 1988 – Maurice Blackburn, Canadian composer and conductor (born 1914)
- 1988 – Ted Kluszewski, American baseball player and coach (born 1924)
- 1991 – Guy Bourdin, French photographer (born 1928)
- 1992 – Paul Henreid, American actor (born 1908)
- 1994 – Bill Travers, English actor, director, and screenwriter (born 1922)
- 1995 – Mort Meskin, American illustrator (born 1916)
- 1995 – Terry Moore, American baseball player and coach (born 1912)
- 1996 – Bill Goldsworthy, Canadian ice hockey player (born 1944)
- 1997 – Norman Pirie, British biochemist and virologist (born 1907)
- 1999 – Joe Williams, American jazz singer (born 1918)
- 2001 – Helge Ingstad, Norwegian lawyer, academic, and explorer (born 1899)
- 2001 – John Lewis, American pianist and composer (born 1920)
- 2003 – Carlo Urbani, Italian physician and microbiologist (born 1956)
- 2004 – Lise de Baissac, Mauritian-born SOE agent (born 1905)
- 2004 – Joel Feinberg, American philosopher and academic (born 1926)
- 2006 – Salvador Elizondo, Mexican author and poet (born 1932)
- 2007 – Larry L'Estrange, English rugby player and soldier (born 1934)
- 2009 – Vladimir Fedotov, Russian footballer and manager (born 1943)
- 2009 – Andy Hallett, American actor and singer (born 1975)
- 2011 – Ângelo de Sousa, Portuguese painter and sculptor (born 1938)
- 2011 – Iakovos Kambanellis, Greek author, poet, playwright, and screenwriter (born 1921)
- 2012 – Pap Cheyassin Secka, Gambian lawyer and politician, 8th Attorney General of the Gambia (born 1942)
- 2012 – Bill Jenkins, American race car driver and engineer (born 1930)
- 2013 – Reginald Gray, Irish-French painter (born 1930)
- 2013 – Brian Huggins, English-Canadian journalist and actor (born 1931)
- 2013 – Ralph Klein, Canadian journalist and politician, 12th Premier of Alberta (born 1942)
- 2013 – Art Phillips, Canadian businessman and politician, 32nd Mayor of Vancouver (born 1930)
- 2014 – Marc Platt, American actor and dancer (born 1913)
- 2015 – William Delafield Cook, Australian-English painter (born 1926)
- 2016 – Patty Duke, American actress (born 1946)
- 2017 – Alexei Abrikosov, Russian physicist, 2003 Nobel laureate in Physics (born 1928)
- 2018 – Anita Shreve, American author (born 1946)
- 2019 – Agnès Varda, French film director (born 1928)
- 2020 – Joe Diffie, American country music singer (born 1958)
- 2020 – Alan Merrill, American musician (born 1951)
- 2020 – Krzysztof Penderecki, Polish composer and conductor (born 1933)
- 2021 – Bashkim Fino, Albanian politician, 29th Prime Minister of Albania (born 1962)
- 2021 – Sarah Onyango Obama, Kenyan educator and philanthropist (born 1921)
- 2022 – Charles Jeffrey, British botanist (born 1934)
- 2022 – Jennifer Wilson, English actress (born 1932)
- 2023 – John Kerin, Australian politician (born 1937)
- 2023 – Vivan Sundaram, Indian contemporary artist (born 1943)
- 2024 – Gerry Conway, English folk and rock drummer/percussionist (born 1947)
- 2024 – Louis Gossett Jr., American actor (born 1936)
- 2025 – Richard Chamberlain, American actor (born 1934)

== Holidays and observances ==
- Christian feast day:
  - Armogastes
  - Berthold of Calabria
  - Gwynllyw
  - Jonas and Barachisius
  - Ludolph of Ratzeburg
  - March 29 (Eastern Orthodox liturgics)
- Boganda Day (Central African Republic)
- Commemoration of the 1947 Rebellion (Madagascar)
- National Vietnam War Veterans Day (United States)
- Day of the Young Combatant (Chile)
- Youth Day (Taiwan)
