= The Political Unconscious =

Book on Marxist Literary Theory by Fredric Jameson

The Political Unconscious: Narrative as a Socially Symbolic Act
- Cover of the 1982 Cornell University Press edition
- Author: Fredric Jameson
- Language: English
- Subject: Literary criticism
- Published: 1981
- Publication place: United States
- Media type: Print
- ISBN: 978-0801492228

The Political Unconscious: Narrative as a Socially Symbolic Act is a 1981 book by the Marxist literary theorist Fredric Jameson. Often cited as a powerful overview and methodological guide, it is the work with which Jameson made his greatest impact. The book has been the subject of a commentary, Jameson, Althusser, Marx (1984), by William C. Dowling, who believes that its main idea had been previously outlined by Terry Eagleton and notes that it is influenced by such thinkers as A. J. Greimas, Northrop Frye, Hans-Georg Gadamer, and Claude Lévi-Strauss. Jameson's interpretive framework, including his post-Lacanian idea of unconscious ideology and his invocation of structural causality to reconcile Marxist and post-Marxist perspectives, was largely influenced by Louis Althusser, although he elaborates and challenges Althusser's ideas.

The book opens with one of Jameson's most famous bons mots, 'Always historicize!'.

== See also ==
- Immediacy, or The Style of Too Late Capitalism by Anna Kornbluh
- Postmodernism, or, the Cultural Logic of Late Capitalism by Fredrick Jameson
