= Postmodernism, or, the Cultural Logic of Late Capitalism =

1991 book by Fredric Jameson

- Author: Fredric Jameson
- Language: English
- Subjects: Art criticism; Literary criticism; Marxism; Semiotics
- Publisher: Duke University Press
- Publication date: 1991
- Publication place: United States
- Media type: Print (hardback and paperback)
- Pages: 461
- ISBN: 978-0-8223-1090-7
- OCLC: 21330492
- LC Class: PN98.P67 J3 1991

Postmodernism, or, the Cultural Logic of Late Capitalism is a book written by Fredric Jameson. It was originally published in 1991 by Duke University Press. In this book, Jameson offers a critique of modernism and postmodernism. The book began as a 1984 article in the New Left Review. It has been presented as his "most wide-ranging and accessible book".

== Synopsis ==
Jameson defines postmodernism as the cultural system of a global, financialized stage of capitalist society. Jameson argues that postmodernism is characterized by a "crisis of historicity", a "waning of affect", and a prevalence of pastiche. He traces these characteristics of postmodernism across a variety of fields and media, including film, television, literature, economics, architecture, and philosophy. In one of his most prominent examples, he draws out the differences between modernism and postmodernism by comparing Van Gogh's "Peasant Shoes" with Andy Warhol's "Diamond Dust Shoes". For Jameson, postmodernism, as a form of mass-culture driven by capitalism, pervades every aspect of daily life.

=== Artificiality ===
Hence, according to Jameson, postmodern society is overly concerned with artificial images, spectacles, and copies. "Reality" has been replaced by how things are represented and talked about. Society has stopped focusing on the creation and usefulness of real goods such as in the sphere of production. Instead, the focus has shifted to consuming and trading information, symbols, and media. Jameson additionally says that the mechanics of postmodern culture and modern capitalism are essentially the same. Both systems survive by erasing history, breaking things down into isolated parts, and turning everything into a product to be bought and sold.

Jameson asserts that the cultural concern with fake images results in strengthening the capitalist system. Because objective reality has been replaced by images, literature's job is no longer to document the real world. Instead, its purpose is to underscore the conflicts and confusing contradictions of living in a postmodern society. Jameson has a divided opinion on modern literary and cultural theories like deconstruction. He respects these theories because they do an excellent job of explaining how our society relies on artificial representations. However, he strongly criticizes them because they have surrendered to and celebrate this capitalist market-driven system instead of challenging it.

=== Complex environments ===
Established spaces like natural landscapes and familiar cityscapes have been replaced by complex, disorienting environments like massive hotels and international airport terminals. Jameson refers to these spaces as “hyperspace.” He thinks humans currently lack the mental, or cognitive, tools to reasonably map or understand these new, overwhelming spaces. These zones are isolated from their local surroundings and are instead tied to anonymous global corporate networks. The disorientation and awe people feel in these spaces are intentional. This disorientation breaks down resistance and encourages carefree and mindless consumption.

=== Totalizing forces and fragmentation ===
In the postmodern era, capitalism and culture have expanded into everything, completely incorporating nature and even the human subconscious. Because everything is part of the system, attempts to rebel or criticize are often absorbed and used by the system itself to function. Local or internal resistance is ineffective against a global capitalist system. Jameson argues that effective opposition requires a global socialist perspective that is ultimately anchored outside the all-encompassing cultural boundaries. The traditional idea of the independent, self-driven individual such as the autonomous ego, the solitary rebel, or the genius, no longer exists. Individuals are now fragmented and defined by their various roles within social groups and corporate bureaucracies. Jameson is critical of this shift. While acknowledging that groups shape identity, he argues that focusing on smaller, disconnected groups replaces broader "class consciousness." Unlike traditional social classes, these modern groups tend to ignore history, rarely challenge the capitalist market, and distract from larger struggles over economic production and revolution.

In Jameson's view, because the unique individual has vanished, true personal artistic style is no longer possible. In its place is "pastiche” which is the practice of randomly mixing older styles, genres, and codes. Unlike parody, which mimics something to mock it or make a point, pastiche is a neutral imitation of dead styles. This practice ignores material history and original creativity, instead "high culture" and mass consumer culture are one jumbled collection of past fashions. So, these boundaries are essentially erased.

== Table of contents ==
Contents:

1. The Cultural Logic of Late Capitalism
2. Theories of the Postmodern
3. Surrealism Without the Unconscious
4. Spatial Equivalents in the World System
5. Reading and the Division of Labor
6. Utopianism After the End of Utopia
7. Immanence and Nominalism in Postmodern Theoretical Discourse
8. Postmodernism and the Market
9. Nostalgia for the Present
10. Secondary Elaborations

== See also ==
- Late capitalism
- Immediacy, or The Style of Too Late Capitalism by Anna Kornbluh
- The Political Unconscious by Fredrick Jameson
