= Vanishing mediator =

A vanishing mediator is a concept that exists to mediate between two opposing ideas, as a transition occurs between them. This mediating concept exists just long enough to facilitate such an interaction: at the point where one idea has been replaced by the other, the concept is no longer required and thus vanishes. In terms of Hegelian dialectics the conflict between the theoretical abstraction and its empirical negation (through trial and error) is resolved by a concretion of the two ideas, representing a theoretical abstraction taking into account the previous contradiction, whereupon the mediator vanishes.

In terms of psychoanalytic theory, when someone is caught in a dilemma they experience hysteria. A conceptual deadlock exists until the resulting hysteric breakdown precipitates some kind of resolution, therefore the Hysteria is a vanishing mediator in this case.

In terms of political history, it refers to social movements, which operate in a particular way to influence politics, until they either are forgotten or change their purpose.

Fredric Jameson introduced the term in a 1973 essay ("The Vanishing Mediator: Narrative Structure in Max Weber," in New German Critique 1 [Winter, 1973]: 52-89). Alain Badiou uses a similar, but more explicitly post-structuralist term (″terme évanouissant″ or ″vanishing term″) in Théorie du sujet.

Since, this concept has been adopted by Slavoj Žižek in For They Know Not What They Do: Enjoyment as a Political Factor (1991), where he uses it in a political sense, similar to Karl Marx's analysis of revolution.

Applications of this concept exist in various fields, making it a viable framework in cultural studies, literature, and qualitative research among others ("Developing the Vanishing Mediator as Theoretical Framework: Synthesis and Application," [Fall, 2019]). One application is provided, for instance, by Balibar in his argument of Europe as a vanishing mediator.
