= Mediations (journal) =

Journal of the Marxist Literary Group

Mediations is the journal of the Marxist Literary Group. It was established by Fredric Jameson as a theoretical newsletter in the early 1970s and transformed into a peer-reviewed academic journal in 1990–1991 by Ron Strickland and Chris Newfield. The publication was reorganized in 2007 as a web-based journal, appearing twice-yearly and publishing dossiers of translated material on special topics and open-submission issues, usually in alternation.
