= Backyard Ballistics =

2001 book by William Gurstelle

- Author: William Gurstelle
- Language: English
- Genre: How-to-book
- ISBN: 1556523750

Backyard Ballistics is a how-to book by William Gurstelle that was published in 2001. It is full of experiments that can be done relatively inexpensively and can be easily executed. It also includes the history and mechanical principles of some of the inventions and projects. From catapults to rockets, this book describes accessible ways to create these at home or in the classroom. In addition to recreational use by individuals, teacher's guides have been developed and science fair projects designed around this book. It has been cited in several educational and scientific journals.
