= Lu Zongda =

Lu Zongda (Chinese: 陆宗达, 1905 – 1988), courtesy name Yingmin (一作颖明), a native of Cixi, Zhejiang Province, was a Chinese textual exegete under the tutelage of linguistic and philological scholars Huang Kan (黄侃) and Zhang Taiyan (章太炎).

== Biography ==
In 1911, Lu Zongda went to study in a school; in 1914, he took the examination for the primary school of Normal University; in 1918, he was admitted to Shuntian Middle School; in 1922, he was admitted to the Department of Chinese Literature of the Preparatory Course of Peking University; in 1924, he was admitted to the undergraduate program of Peking University.

In the spring of 1928, he and Huang Zhuo went to Nanjing to study under Huang Kan, and in June, he graduated from Peking University. In 1947, he was appointed as a professor of the Chinese Department of Beijing Normal University, honorary president of the Chinese Society of Exegesis, and vice-chairman of the Beijing Municipal Committee of Political Consultative Conference. During his tenure at Beijing Normal University, he created a new discipline, Chinese language and philology, in its Faculty of Letters. In 1962, Lu Zongda was invited to lecture at Peking University for the first class of students majoring in Ancient Literature, and since the 1970s, Lu Zongda had begun to establish exegetical curriculums at universities, participating in seminars on the preparation of textbooks and serving as president of the first exegetical society, and cultivating disciples such as Wang Ning. In addition to exegesis, his personal fields of research include Chinese phonetics, literature and modern Chinese grammar.
