= Immediacy, or The Style of Too Late Capitalism =

2024 Non-fiction book by Anna Kornbluh

- Book jacket for "Immediacy"
- Author: Anna Kornbluh
- Audio read by: Sara Sheckells
- Language: English
- Subject: Critical theory, Pop culture
- Genre: Nonfiction
- Set in: Europe and the United States
- Published: 2024
- Publisher: Verso Books
- Media type: Print, E-book, Audio
- Pages: 240
- ISBN: 9781804291344 9781804291368
- OCLC: 1463467886
- Dewey Decimal: 700.1
- Website: Official website

Immediacy, or The Style of Too Late Capitalism is a nonfiction book by Anna Kornbluh. It was published in 2024 by Verso Books. In this book, Kornbluh shows how Western societies' obsession with the immediate present shapes every part of today's culture, from modern novels and streaming apps to psychoanalysis. This is the author's fourth book, and the first published with a non-academic press.

== Synopsis ==
According to Kornbluh, her central theme of "Immediacy" is a cultural style that removes middlemen and barriers. It highly values speed, transparency, directness, and personal authenticity. This trend centers entirely on the individual self and its direct experience with culture, promoting the ego above all else. This has resulted in a shift in capitalism. In other words, modern capitalism, referred to as "too late capitalism" or neoliberalism, has shifted its focus Instead of producing new things, it focuses on rapidly circulating and rearranging existing things as in goods, information, people. Technology and deregulation have created a flat, fast-paced world where everything must be instantly available and constantly flowing.

The author points to evidence of this style across society, including:

- The rise of first-person writing and autobiographical fiction.
- Instant digital communications like emojis and clicks.
- Endless scrolling and sharing on social media.
- "Immersive" art exhibits and video streaming.

=== Instant engagement ===
This has resulted in a rejection of the critical mediation occurring between art and observer. Culture has moved away from the style of reflection, irony, and artistic distance. Instead, it favors direct, flat, and instant engagement where that which is described as authenticity is treated as a brand. Such things result in a negative impact. In other words, the constant flow and demand for instant gratification harm society by discouraging deep critical thinking. It prevents people from properly analyzing the world or imagining different social and political futures. So, the author’s goal is rather than critiquing traditional economic production, Kornbluh demonstrably critiques popular modern culture, arguing that the demand for "immediacy" is the defining thread of twenty-first-century life.

== See also ==
- Postmodernism, or, the Cultural Logic of Late Capitalism by Fredric Jameson
- The Political Unconscious by Fredric Jameson
