= Marxist Literary Group =

Literary group concerned with Marxism

The Marxist Literary Group (MLG) is an American affiliate of the Modern Language Association centered on scholarly discussion of the contributions of Marxism and the Marxist tradition in the humanities and related disciplines. It holds an annual summer institute, holds sessions at the MLA convention, and publishes the journal Mediations. It is also an affiliate of the Midwest Modern Language Association and occasionally sponsors sessions at other regional MLA conferences.

== History ==
The MLG was formed in 1969 by Fredric Jameson and several of his graduate students at the University of California, San Diego. The group emerged from the 1968 MLA conference in New York City. Whereas groups such as the Radical Caucus focused their energies on pedagogy and social activism, the MLG was concerned with providing a firm theoretical grounding for the New Left as well as cultivating Marxist intellectuals.

The MLG quickly became the largest affiliate group in the MLA, running 14 sessions at the 1975 conference and organizing Marxist scholars nationwide. The first Institute on Culture and Society took place in St. Cloud, Minnesota, in 1976, including speakers such as Fredric Jameson, Stanley Aronowitz, Terry Eagleton, Gayatri Spivak, Michael Ryan, Gene Holland, June Howard, and John Beverly. Subsequent Institutes have dealt with a wide range of topics, including cultural studies, postmodernism, post-structuralism, psychoanalysis, post-colonial discourse, feminism, and left politics. A newsletter was set up in the early 1970s, which evolved into the journal Mediations by 1991. These activities were instrumental in allowing Marxist theory and criticism to gain a foothold in the academy.

== Presidents ==
- Eugene W. Holland (1974–1978)
- Paul Smith (1988–1997)
- Jamie Owen Daniel (1997–2005)
- Nicholas Brown (2005–present)

== Activities ==
- MLG Summer Institute on Culture and Society.
- Mediations: Journal of the Marxist Literary Group
- The Michael Sprinker Graduate Writing Competition
