= Ian Buchanan (academic) =

Australian public academic

- Born: 1969 (age 56–57)
- Education: Murdoch University (BA, PhD)
- Occupation: Philosopher
- Employer: University of Wollongong

Ian Buchanan (born 1969) is an Australian philosopher who has published works on Michel de Certeau, Gilles Deleuze, and Fredric Jameson. He is Professor of Critical Theory and Cultural Studies at the University of Wollongong.

== Biography ==
Born in rural Western Australia, Buchanan grew up in the suburbs of Perth. He did his BA and PhD in the English and Comparative Literature program at Murdoch University, graduating in 1995. His PhD dissertation is titled Heterology: Towards a Transcendental Empiricist Approach to Cultural Studies.

Since 2011, Buchanan has been a member of Faculty of the Arts at the University of Wollongong, where he is Professor of Critical Theory and Cultural Studies.

== Work ==
Buchanan edited special issues of the journals Social Semiotics (vol 7:2, 1997) and South Atlantic Quarterly (vol 93:3, 1997); the latter was subsequently reprinted as the book A Deleuzian Century?

== Buchanan on assemblage ==
In Assemblage Theory and Method (2020), Buchanan develops an interpretation of Gilles Deleuze and Félix Guattari's concept of agencement that differs from Manuel DeLanda's systems-oriented account. Rather than conceiving assemblages primarily as collections of heterogeneous components, Buchanan emphasizes the principles of selection and organization through which their components are arranged. His interpretation foregrounds desire, stratification, territorialization, and the reciprocal relationship between the material or machinic dimension of assemblages and their expressive dimension.

A central concern of Buchanan's approach is the relationship between assemblage and desire. Assemblages are not merely configurations of interacting elements but productive arrangements whose organization cannot be understood independently of desire. Buchanan consequently treats assemblage theory as a method for analyzing how particular social, cultural, and political formations acquire consistency, reproduce themselves, and undergo transformation.

In Assemblage Theory and Affect (2026), Buchanan extends this account by arguing that assemblage theory and affect theory must be understood together within Deleuze and Guattari's broader project of schizoanalysis. He advances three interconnected arguments: first, that affect is a function of desire and should be understood in relation to desire's psychical agency; second, that affect designates a capacity to respond and act rather than merely a reaction to external stimuli; and third, that this capacity depends on the particular configurations of assemblages, bodies without organs, and abstract machines through which desire is organized.

In this account, affect is inseparable from the conditions that enable or constrain a body's capacities. Buchanan thereby connects assemblage theory to an ethics of desire, emphasizing how the organization of desire shapes what bodies can do, how they respond to their circumstances, and what possibilities of becoming are available to them.

=== Reception ===
In a 2023 article, Stephen Jay and Timothy Acott distinguish between "systems-oriented" assemblage theory (DeLanda) and "purpose-oriented" assemblage theory (Buchanan). They suggest that Buchanan's interpretation may be described as a "Buchanan assemblage," in contrast to DeLanda's more widely cited model. The article highlights the incompatibility of the two approaches, with Buchanan's emphasising desire and purposive composition and DeLanda's emphasising emergent systems of heterogeneous parts.

== Bibliography ==
- Michel de Certau: Cultural Theorist (London: 2000, SAGE Publications) ISBN 0761958983
- Deleuze: A Metacommentary (Edinburgh: Edinburgh University Press, 2000) ISBN 0748610057
- Fredric Jameson: Live Theory (London & New York: Continuum, 2006) ISBN 082649109X
- Deleuze and Guattari's Anti-Oedipus (London & New York: Continuum, 2008) ISBN 0826491499
- Assemblage Theory and Method: An Introduction and Guide (London & New York: Bloomsbury Academic, 2020) ISBN 1350015555
- The Incomplete Project of Schizoanalysis: Collected Essays on Deleuze and Guattari (Edinburgh: Edinburgh University Press, 2021) ISBN 1474487890
