= Signatures of the Visible =

Signatures of the Visible is a nonfiction book written by literary theorist and critic, Fredric Jameson, providing critical analysis on film styles such postmodernism and cultural categories that are termed as broad. The book was published in 1990 by Routledge.
