= American Literary History =

- Discipline: English literature
- Language: English
- Edited by: Gordon Hutner

Publication details
- History: 1989–present
- Publisher: Oxford University Press (United Kingdom)
- Frequency: Quarterly

Standard abbreviations
- ISO 4: Am. Lit. Hist.

Indexing
- ISSN: 0896-7148
- LCCN: 2002-227118
- JSTOR: 08967148
- OCLC no.: 50709474

Links
- Journal homepage

American Literary History is a quarterly peer-reviewed academic journal published by Oxford University Press that covers all periods of American literature. It was founded in 1989 and is edited by Gordon Hutner.
