= Fredric Jameson =

American academic and literary critic (1934–2024)

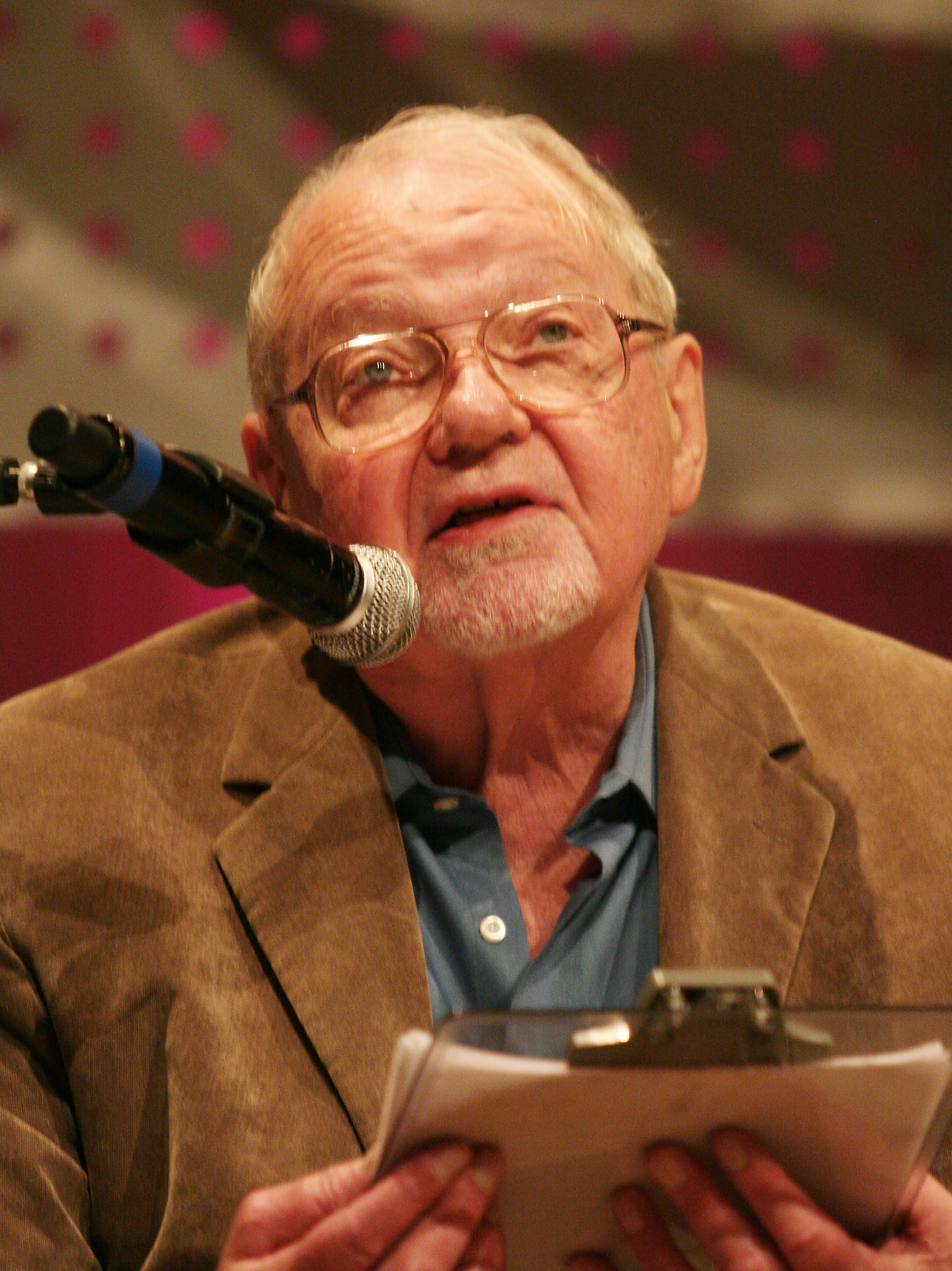
- Jameson in 2004
- Born: Fredric Ruff Jameson; April 14, 1934; Cleveland, Ohio, U.S.
- Died: September 22, 2024 (aged 90); Killingworth, Connecticut, U.S.
- Spouse: Susan Willis
- Children: 7

Education
- Education: Haverford College (BA); Yale University (PhD)
- Thesis: The Origins of Sartre's Style (1959)
- Doctoral advisor: Erich Auerbach

Philosophical work
- Era: Contemporary philosophy
- Region: Western philosophy
- School: Western Marxism; Marxist hermeneutics
- Institutions: Harvard University (1959–67); UC San Diego (1967–76); Yale University (1976–83); UC Santa Cruz (1983–85); Duke University (1985–2024)
- Doctoral students: Kim Stanley Robinson; Sara Danius
- Notable students: John Beverley
- Main interests: Marxist cultural analysis, utopia; Marxist literary criticism, history; postmodernism; structuralism; cultural studies; science fiction; modernism; narrative; dialectics
- Notable ideas: Alternate modernity; Cognitive mapping; National allegory; Political unconscious; Vanishing mediator

Fredric Ruff Jameson (April 14, 1934 – September 22, 2024) was an American literary critic, philosopher and Marxist political theorist. He was best known for his analysis of contemporary cultural trends, particularly his analysis of postmodernity and capitalism. Jameson's best-known books include Postmodernism, or, The Cultural Logic of Late Capitalism (1991) and The Political Unconscious (1981).

Jameson was the Knut Schmidt Nielsen Professor of Comparative Literature, Professor of Romance Studies (French), and Director of the Institute for Critical Theory at Duke University. In 2012, the Modern Language Association gave Jameson its sixth Award for Lifetime Scholarly Achievement.

== Early life and works ==
Fredric Ruff Jameson was born in Cleveland, Ohio, on April 14, 1934. He was the only child of Frank S. Jameson (c.1890–?), a New York-born medical doctor with his own private practice, and Bernice née Ruff (c.1904–1966), a Michigan-born Barnard College graduate who did not work outside the family home. Both his parents had non-wage income over $50 in 1939 (about USD$1130 in 2024). By April 1935 he moved with his parents to Gloucester City, New Jersey, and by 1949 the family occupied a house in the nearby middle-class suburb of Haddon Heights, New Jersey. He graduated from Moorestown Friends School in 1950.

He completed a BA summa cum laude in French at Haverford College, where he was elected to the Phi Beta Kappa society in his junior year. His professors at Haverford included Wayne Booth, to whom A Singular Modernity (2002) is dedicated. After graduation in 1954 he briefly traveled to Europe, studying at Aix-en-Provence, Munich, and Berlin, where he learned of new developments in continental philosophy, including the rise of structuralism. He returned to America the following year to study at Yale University under Erich Auerbach in pursuit of a PhD, which was awarded in 1959 for a dissertation on The Origins of Sartre's Style.

=== Career summary ===
From 1959 to 1967 he taught French and Comparative Literature at Harvard University.

He was employed by the University of California, San Diego from 1967 (Note: By his own account, he only arrived in San Diego in late 1968.) to 1976, where he worked alongside Herbert Marcuse. He taught classes on Marxist literary criticism, the Frankfurt School, the French novel and poetry, and Sartre. He was then hired by Yale University through Paul de Man in 1976, and by the University of California, Santa Cruz in 1983.

In 1985 he joined Duke University as Professor of Literature and Professor of Romance Studies. He established the literary studies program at Duke and held the William A. Lane Professorship of Comparative Literature, renamed in 2013, as Knut Schmidt Nielsen Distinguished Professorship of Comparative Literature.

In 1985 he was elected to the American Academy of Arts and Sciences.

=== Early works ===
Erich Auerbach would prove to be a lasting influence on Jameson's thought. This was already apparent in Jameson's doctoral dissertation, published in 1961 as Sartre: The Origins of a Style. Auerbach's concerns were rooted in the German philological tradition; his works on the history of style analyzed literary form within social history. Jameson would follow in these steps, examining the articulation of poetry, history, philology, and philosophy in the works of Jean-Paul Sartre, who was the subject of his dissertation.

Jameson's work focused on the relation between the style of Sartre's writings and the political and ethical positions of his existentialist philosophy. The occasional Marxian aspects of Sartre's work were glossed over in this book; Jameson would return to them in the following decade.

Jameson's dissertation, though it drew on a long tradition of European cultural analysis, differed markedly from the prevailing trends of Anglo-American academia (which were empiricism and logical positivism in philosophy and linguistics, and New Critical formalism in literary criticism). It nevertheless earned Jameson a position at Harvard University.

=== Research into Marxism ===
His interest in Sartre led Jameson to intense study of Marxist literary theory. Even though Karl Marx was becoming an important influence in American social science, partly through the influence of the many European intellectuals who had sought refuge from the Second World War in the United States, such as Theodor Adorno, the literary and critical work of the Western Marxists was still largely unknown in American academia in the late-1950s and early-1960s.

Jameson's shift toward Marxism was also driven by his increasing political connection with the New Left and pacifist movements, as well as by the Cuban Revolution, which Jameson took as a sign that "Marxism was alive and well as a collective movement and a culturally productive force". His research focused on critical theory: thinkers of, and influenced by, the Frankfurt School, such as Kenneth Burke, György Lukács, Ernst Bloch, Theodor Adorno, Walter Benjamin, Herbert Marcuse, Louis Althusser, and Sartre, who viewed cultural criticism as an integral feature of Marxist theory. In 1969, Jameson co-founded the Marxist Literary Group with a number of his graduate students at the University of California, San Diego.

While the Orthodox Marxist view of ideology held that the cultural "superstructure" was completely determined by the economic "base", the Western Marxists critically analyzed culture as a historical and social phenomenon alongside economic production and distribution or political power relationships. They held that culture must be studied using the Hegelian concept of immanent critique: the theory that adequate description and criticism of a philosophical or cultural text must be carried out in the same terms that text itself employs, in order to develop its internal inconsistencies in a manner that allows intellectual advancement. Marx highlighted immanent critique in his early writings, derived from Hegel's development of a new form of dialectical thinking that would attempt, as Jameson comments, "to lift itself mightily up by its own bootstraps".

=== Narrative and history ===
History came to play an increasingly central role in Jameson's interpretation of both the reading (consumption) and writing (production) of literary texts. Jameson marked his full-fledged commitment to Hegelian-Marxist philosophy with the publication of The Political Unconscious: Narrative as a Socially Symbolic Act, the opening slogan of which is "always historicize" (1981). The Political Unconscious takes as its object not the literary text itself, but rather the interpretive frameworks by which it is now constructed. As Jonathan Culler has observed, The Political Unconscious emerged as an alternative method to interpret literary narratives.

The book's argument emphasized history as the "ultimate horizon" of literary and cultural analysis. It borrowed notions from the structuralist tradition and from Raymond Williams's work in cultural studies, and joined them to a largely Marxist view of labor (whether blue-collar or intellectual) as the focal point of analysis. Jameson's readings exploited both the explicit formal and thematic choices of the writer and the unconscious framework guiding these. Artistic choices that were ordinarily viewed in purely aesthetic terms were recast in terms of historical literary practices and norms, in an attempt to develop a systematic inventory of the constraints they imposed on the artist as an individual creative subject. To further this meta-commentary, Jameson described the ideologeme, or "the smallest intelligible unit of the essentially antagonistic collective discourses of social classes", the smallest legible residue of the real-life, ongoing struggles occurring between social classes. (Note: The term "ideologeme" was first used by Mikhail Bakhtin and Pavel Nikolaevich Medvedev in their work The Formal Method in Literary Scholarship and was later popularised by Julia Kristeva. Kristeva defined it as "the intersection of a given textual arrangement ... with the utterances ... that it either assimilates into its own space or to which it refers in the space of exterior texts ...".)

Jameson's establishment of history as the only pertinent factor in this analysis, which derived the categories governing artistic production from their historical framework, was paired with a bold theoretical claim. His book claimed to establish Marxian literary criticism, centered in the notion of an artistic mode of production, as the most all-inclusive and comprehensive theoretical framework for understanding literature. According to Vincent B. Leitch, the publication of The Political Unconscious "rendered Jameson the leading Marxist literary critic in America."

=== Analysis of postmodernism ===
==== Background ====
It is Jameson's contribution to a conception and analysis of postmodernism that has had the most impact in its breadth and reach. At the time of his death in 2024, it was generally recognized that he was the preeminent critic of postmodernism. Jameson's contention was that postmodernism is the cultural expression of late capitalism. Postmodernism represents the form of an enormous cultural expansion into an economy of spectacle and style, rather than the production of goods.

Jameson developed this form of analysis during a time when "an art-historical debate had wondered for several years whether our age had moved beyond modern art and on to 'postmodern' art". Jameson joined in on the debate in 1984 with his article titled "Postmodernism, or, the Cultural Logic of Late Capitalism" that was first published in the journal New Left Review. He later expanded the article into a book, which he published in 1991.

==== Jameson's argument ====
Jameson's argument centered around his assertion that the various phenomena of the postmodern had been, or could have been, understood successfully within a modernist framework. This differed from the most prominent views of the postmodern condition that existed at that time. In Jameson's view, postmodernity's merging of all discourse into an undifferentiated whole was the result of the colonization of the cultural sphere—which had retained at least partial autonomy during the prior modernist era—by a newly organized corporate capitalism. (Note: According to Douglas Kellner: "Following Ernest Mandel's periodization in his book Late Capitalism (1975), Jameson claims that "there have been three fundamental moments in capitalism, each one marking a dialectical expansion over the previous stage. These are market capitalism, the monopoly stage or the stage of imperialism, and our own, wrongly called postindustrial, but what might better be termed multinational, capital". To these forms of society correspond the cultural forms realism, modernism, and postmodernism.")

Following Adorno and Horkheimer's analysis of the culture industry, Jameson discussed this phenomenon in his critical discussion of architecture, film, narrative, and visual arts, as well as in his strictly philosophical work. For Jameson, postmodernism, as a form of mass-culture driven by capitalism, pervades every aspect of daily life.

==== Key concepts ====
Two of Jameson's best-known claims from Postmodernism, or, the Cultural Logic of Late Capitalism are that post-modernity is characterized by "pastiche" and a "crisis in historicity". And since postmodernism — as was mentioned above — represents the form of an enormous cultural expansion into an economy of spectacle and style, rather than the production of goods, Jameson argued that parody (which implies a moral judgment or a comparison with societal norms) was replaced by pastiche (collage and other forms of juxtaposition without a normative grounding). Jameson recognized that modernism frequently "quotes" from different cultures and historical periods, but he argues that postmodern cultural texts indiscriminately cannibalize these elements, erasing any sense of critical or historical distance, resulting in pure pastiche.

Relatedly, Jameson argues that the postmodern era suffers from a crisis in historicity: "there no longer does seem to be any organic relationship between the [...] history we learn from schoolbooks and the lived experience of the current, multinational, high-rise, stagflated city of the newspapers and of our own everyday life".

Jameson's analysis of postmodernism attempts to view it as historically grounded; he therefore explicitly rejects any moralistic opposition to postmodernity as a cultural phenomenon. Instead, Jameson insists upon a Hegelian immanent critique that would "think the cultural evolution of late capitalism dialectically, as catastrophe and progress all together".

==== Other concepts ====
Some of Jameson's other well-known concepts and philosophical contributions —not mentioned in the preceding section or tangential to his critique of postmodernism— include the concepts of "cognitive mapping" (adapted from Kevin A. Lynch; a form of class consciousness mediated by popular culture that corresponds to the era of capitalist globalization), the "vanishing mediator", totality as conspiracy, "alternate modernity" (the postcolonial notion of distinct regional pathways of capitalism, linked to the political project of BRICS), "wrapping" and antagonism as the principle of totalisation.

=== Later work ===
Several of Jameson's later works, along with Postmodernism, are part of what he called both a "sequence" and "project" entitled The Poetics of Social Forms. This project attempts, in Sara Danius's words, to "provide a general history of aesthetic forms, at the same time seeking to show how this history can be read in tandem with a history of social and economic formations". While the individual works are formally named on the flyleaf of Inventions of a Present, its more nuanced structure—six volumes comprising seven publications grouped into three subdivisions—can be gleaned from mentions in the books themselves. (Note: IA. Categories of the Narrative-Historical (unpublished at the time of his death); IB. Allegory and Ideology (2019), "the second volume of The Poetics of Social Forms."; IIA. The Antinomies of Realism (2013), "the third volume of the sequence called The Poetics of Social Forms."; IIB1. A Singular Modernity (2002), "the theoretical section of the antepenultimate volume of The Poetics of Social Forms."; IIB2. The Modernist Papers (2007), "[these analyses] are meant to accompany my A Singular Modernity as a kind of source-book."; IIC. Postmodernism (1991), "the third and last section of the penultimate subdivision of a larger project entitled The Poetics of Social Forms."; III. Archaeologies of the Future (2005), "the concluding volume of The Poetics of Social Forms.")

Archaeologies of the Future is a study of utopia and science fiction that was launched at Monash University in Melbourne, Australia. The Antinomies of Realism won the 2014 Truman Capote Award for Literary Criticism.

Alongside this project, Jameson published three related studies of dialectical theory: Valences of the Dialectic (2009), which includes Jameson's critical responses to Slavoj Žižek, Gilles Deleuze, and other contemporary theorists; The Hegel Variations (2010), a commentary on Hegel's Phenomenology of Spirit; and Representing Capital: A Reading of Volume One (2011), an analysis of Marx's Das Kapital.

An overview of Jameson's work, Fredric Jameson: Live Theory, by Ian Buchanan, was published in 2007.

== Personal life and death ==
Jameson was married to Janet Jameson, and then to Susan Willis, and had two sons and five daughters in the two marriages. He died at his home in Killingworth, Connecticut, on September 22, 2024, at the age of 90.

== Recognition, influence, and legacy ==
=== MLA awards and honors ===
The Modern Language Association (MLA) recognized Jameson throughout his career. In 1971, Jameson earned the MLA's William Riley Parker Prize. Twenty years later, it awarded him its 1991 James Russell Lowell Prize for Postmodernism, or, The Cultural Logic of Late Capitalism.

The latter has remained a landmark publication in its field since it was published in 1991, and is still Duke University Press's all-time bestseller (as of 2024). Jameson was again recognized by the MLA, this time in 2012, with its MLA Lifetime Achievement Award.

=== Holberg International Memorial Prize ===
In 2008, Jameson was awarded the annual Holberg International Memorial Prize in recognition of his career-long research "on the relation between social formations and cultural forms". The prize, which was worth 4.6 million kr (approximately $648,000), was presented to Jameson by Tora Aasland, Norwegian Minister of Education and Research, in Bergen, Norway, on November 26, 2008.

=== Lyman Tower Sargent Distinguished Scholar Award ===
In 2009, Jameson was awarded the Lyman Tower Sargent Distinguished Scholar Award by the North American Society for Utopian Studies. Jameson was given credit for his "significant role in introducing to an English reading audience the rich theorizations of Utopia found in German critical theory, in works written by Walter Benjamin, Herbert Marcuse, and most significantly, Ernst Bloch." It was also noted that "the question of Utopia is central to all of Jameson's work."

=== Influence in China ===
Jameson has had an influence on the theorization of the postmodern in China. In mid-1985, shortly after the beginning of the cultural fever (early 1985 to the 1989 Tiananmen Square massacre)—a period in Chinese intellectual history characterized in part by intense interest in Western critical theory, literary theory, and related disciplines—Jameson discussed the idea of postmodernism in China in lectures at Peking University and the newly founded Shenzhen University. (Note: Jameson's ideas as presented at Peking University had an impact on some students, including Zhang Yiwu and Zhang Xudong, scholars whose work would come to play an important role in the analysis of postmodernity in China.)

In 1987, Jameson published a book entitled Postmodernism and Cultural Theories. (Note: (Chinese: 后现代主义与文化理论; pinyin: Hòuxiàndàizhǔyì yǔ wénhuà lǐlùn), translated into Chinese by Tang Xiaobing.) Although the Chinese intelligentsia's engagement with postmodernism would not begin in earnest until the nineties, Postmodernism and Cultural Theories was to become a keystone text in that engagement; as scholar Wang Ning writes, its influence on Chinese thinkers would be impossible to overestimate. (Note: Its popularity may be partially due to the fact that it was not written in a dense style and so it was possible to use the text as both praise and/or criticism of the Chinese manifestation of postmodernity.) (Note: However, in Wang Chaohua's interpretation of events, Jameson's work was mostly used to support and praise, and therefore amounted to a fundamental misreading of Jameson: The caustic edge of Jameson's theory, which had described postmodernism as "the cultural logic of late capitalism", was abandoned for a contented or even enthusiastic endorsement of mass culture, which [a certain group of Chinese critics] saw as a new space of popular freedom. According to these critics, intellectuals, who conceived of themselves as the bearers of modernity, were reacting with shock and anxiety at their loss of control with the arrival of postmodern consumer society, uttering cries of "quixotic hysteria", panic-stricken by the realization of what they had once called for during the eighties.)

This debate over postmodernism, in part fueled by Jameson, was at its most intense from 1994 to 1997, carried on by Chinese intellectuals both inside and outside the mainland; particularly important contributions came from Zhao Yiheng in London, Xu Ben in the United States, and Zhang Xudong, also in the United States, who had gone on to study under Jameson as a doctoral student at Duke.

=== Legacy ===
In 2011, Rey Chow, then chair of Duke University's literature program, reflected on Jameson's career on the occasion of presenting him with a lifetime achievement award:

One would be hard put to find a humanities scholar who is more widely visible and more frequently cited across the disciplines, and who has sustained national and international critical attention for a more extended period of time than Fred Jameson

Robert T. Tally Jr.'s review for Jacobin of the 2024 work Inventions of a Present: The Novel in Its Crisis of Globalization described Jameson as:

at the height of his powers, carving out his novel alternative ... [and that] ... for over five decades, Fredric Jameson has been the leading Marxist literary and cultural critic in the United States, if not the world

A memorial piece published by the editorial team of the Marxist journal Historical Materialism: Research in Critical Marxist Theory described Jameson as an "intellectual giant" responsible for an "enduring legacy that has inspired generations of thinkers, activists and scholars". They praised Jameson for his "militant commitment to a materialist reading of moments of struggle and revolt, utopia and liberation in cultural texts."

Another memorial essay in The Nation observed that Jameson has emerged as a figure who "not only amassed one of the most impressive bodies of work within his field but who also was, fundamentally, someone who believed in criticism as a discourse, between teacher and pupil, between the work and the public".

== Publications ==
=== Books ===
- Sartre: The Origins of a Style. New Haven: Yale University Press. 1961.
- Marxism and Form: Twentieth Century Dialectical Theories of Literature. Princeton: Princeton University Press. 1971.
- The Prison-House of Language: A Critical Account of Structuralism and Russian Formalism. Princeton: Princeton University Press. 1972. (Note: For more information see: The Prison-House of Language: A Critical Account of Structuralism and Russian Formalism)
- Fables of Aggression: Wyndham Lewis, the Modernist as Fascist. Berkeley: University of California Press. 1979. Reissued: Verso, 2008.
- The Political Unconscious: Narrative as a Socially Symbolic Act. Ithaca, N.Y.: Cornell University Press. 1981.
- Postmodernism and Cultural Theories (Chinese: 后现代主义与文化理论; pinyin: Hòuxiàndàizhǔyì yǔ wénhuà lǐlùn). Tr. Tang Xiaobing. Xi'an: Shaanxi Normal University Press. 1987.
- The Ideologies of Theory. Essays 1971–1986. Vol. 1: Situations of Theory. Minneapolis: University of Minnesota Press. 1988. (anthology)
- The Ideologies of Theory. Essays 1971–1986. Vol. 2: The Syntax of History. Minneapolis: University of Minnesota Press. 1988. (anthology)
- Nationalism, Colonialism, and Literature. (with Terry Eagleton and Edward Said) Derry: Field Day, 1988. (Note: A collection of Field Day Pamphlets by the three authors.)
- Late Marxism: Adorno, or, The Persistence of the Dialectic. London & New York: Verso. 1990.
- Signatures of the Visible. New York & London: Routledge. 1990.
- Postmodernism, or, the Cultural Logic of Late Capitalism. Durham, NC: Duke University Press. 1991. ISBN 978-0-8223-1090-7 OCLC 21330492
- The Geopolitical Aesthetic: Cinema and Space in the World System. Bloomington: Indiana University Press. 1992.
- The Seeds of Time. The Wellek Library lectures at the University of California, Irvine. New York: Columbia University Press. 1994.
- Brecht and Method. London & New York: Verso. 1998. Reissued: 2011.
- The Cultural Turn: Selected Writings on the Postmodern, 1983–1998. London & New York: Verso. 1998. Reissued: 2009. (anthology)
- The Jameson Reader. Ed. Michael Hardt and Kathi Weeks. Oxford: Blackwell. 2000. ISBN 978-0-631-20270-7
- A Singular Modernity: Essay on the Ontology of the Present. London & New York: Verso. 2002. ISBN 978-1-78168-022-3 (anthology)
- Archaeologies of the Future: The Desire Called Utopia and Other Science Fictions. London & New York: Verso. 2005. OCLC 84151429 (semi-anthology)
- The Modernist Papers. London & New York Verso. 2007.OCLC 939861416
- Jameson on Jameson: Conversations on Cultural Marxism. Ed. Ian Buchanan. Durham, NC: Duke University Press. 2007. OCLC 271177918
- The Ideologies of Theory. London & New York: Verso. 2009. (anthology; altered one-volume re-edition, with additional essays) OCLC 181140234
- Valences of the Dialectic. London & New York: Verso. 2009. OCLC 698450477
- The Hegel Variations: On the Phenomenology of Spirit. London & New York: Verso. 2010. OCLC 540161683
- Representing 'Capital': A Commentary on Volume One. London & New York: Verso. 2011. OCLC 601107882
- The Antinomies of Realism. London & New York: Verso. 2013. OCLC 881655258
- The Ancients and the Postmoderns: On the Historicity of Forms. London & New York: Verso. 2015. OCLC 957133404
- (with others) An American Utopia: Dual Power and the Universal Army. Ed. Slavoj Žižek. London and New York: Verso. 2016. OCLC 950611265
- Raymond Chandler: The Detections of Totality. London and New York: Verso. 2016. OCLC 920966657
- Allegory and Ideology. London and New York: Verso. 2019. OCLC 1040191215
- The Benjamin Files. London and New York: Verso. 2020. OCLC 1155482542
- Mimesis, Expression, Construction: Fredric Jameson's Seminar on Aesthetic Theory. Ed. Octavian Esanu. London: Repeater. 2024 OCLC 1423132299
- Inventions of a Present: The Novel in its Crisis of Globalization. London and New York: Verso. 2024 OCLC 1416967709
- The Years of Theory: Postwar French Thought to the Present. Ed. Carson Welch. London and New York: Verso. 2024 OCLC 1450560539
- After Year Zero: On Postwar German Thought. Ed. Carson Welch. London and New York: Verso. 2026 OCLC 1545279319

=== Selected articles ===
- — (1969–1970), "Walter Benjamin, or Nostalgia", Salmagundi, 10–11 (10/11): 52–68, JSTOR 40546514
- — (1972), "The Great American Hunter, or, Ideological Content in the Novel", College English, 34 (2): 180–197, doi:10.2307/375277, JSTOR 375277
- — (1976), "On Goffman's Frame Analysis", Theory and Society, 3 (1): 119–133, doi:10.1007/BF00158482, JSTOR 656942
- — (2002), "The Dialectics of Disaster" (PDF), South Atlantic Quarterly, 101 (2): 297–304, doi:10.1215/00382876-101-2-297, archived from the original (PDF) on September 29, 2024 (reprinted in Dissent from the Homeland: Essays after September 11, ed. Frank Lentricchia and Stanley Hauerwas, Durham, NC: Duke University Press, 2003, pp. 55–62)
- — (2003), "Future City", New Left Review, 21: 65–80
- — (2004), "Politics of Utopia", New Left Review, II/25 (25) 2489: 35–56, doi:10.64590/puv
- — (2009), "War and Representation", PMLA, 124 (5): 1532–1547, doi:10.1632/pmla.2009.124.5.1532
- — (2016), "Badiou and the French Tradition" (PDF), New Left Review, II/102 (102) 3209: 99–117, doi:10.64590/mu6

== See also ==
- Dialectic
- Dialectical materialism
- Georg Wilhelm Friedrich Hegel
- Karl Marx
- Late capitalism
- Literary realism
- List of contributors to Marxist theory
- Literary theory
- Mark Fisher
- Marxism
- Modernism
- Political consciousness
- Postmodernism
- Psychoanalytic sociology
- Utopia
