= William Gurstelle =

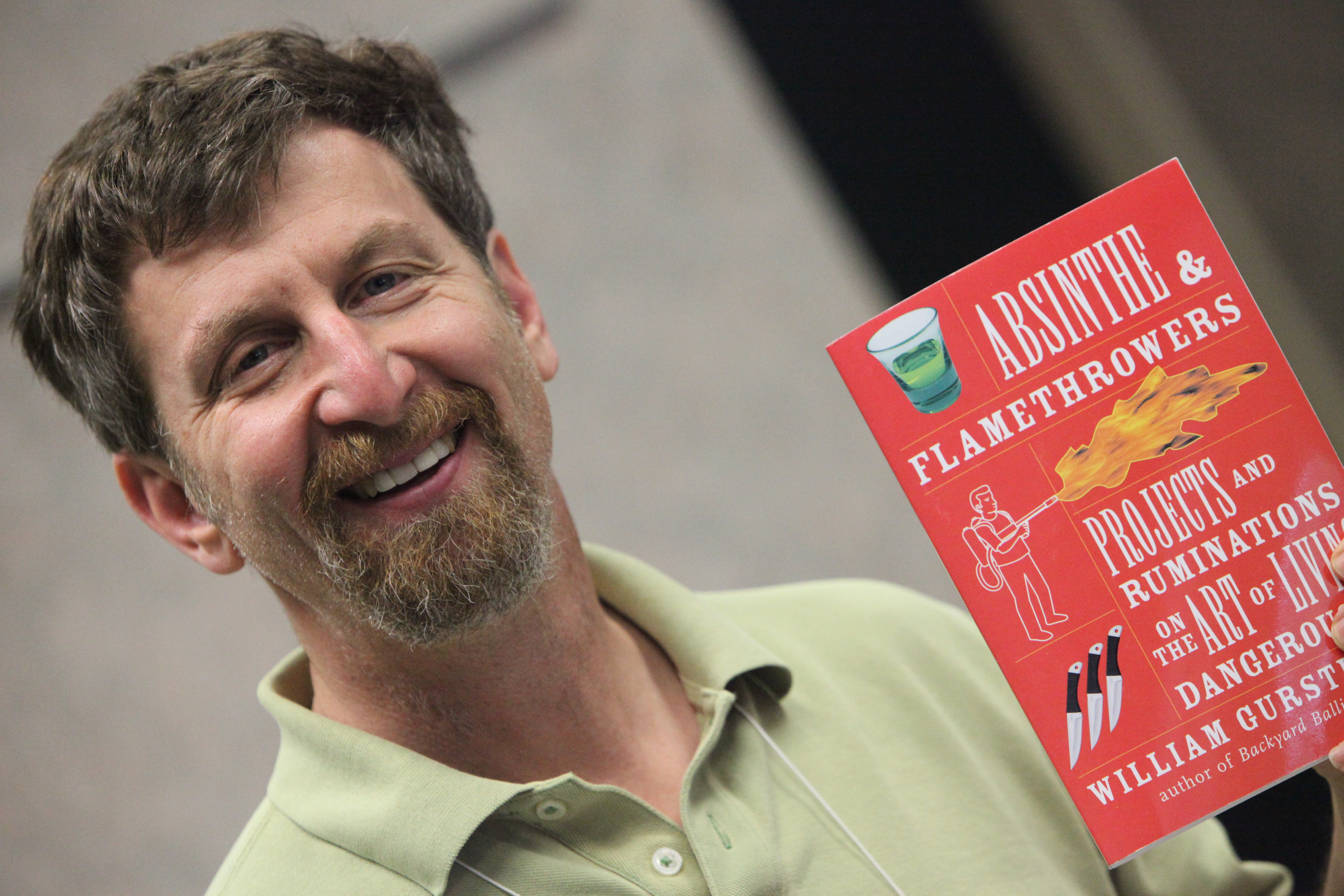
- William Gurstelle at Kinnernet, May 9, 2009
- Education: University of Minnesota; University of Wisconsin
- Employer: Make magazine
- Children: 2
- Website: http://www.Williamgurstelle.com

William Gurstelle (born March 29, 1956) is an American academic, nonfiction author, magazine writer, and inventor. He has been part of the History of Technology, Science, and Medicine program at the University of Minnesota since 2019. He is a feature columnist for Make magazine, a columnist and contributing editor at Popular Science magazine, and an occasional book reviewer for the Wall Street Journal. Previously, he was the Pyrotechnics and Ballistics Editor at Popular Mechanics magazine.

He is also the author of several science “how-to” books published by Crown Books/Random House and Chicago Review Press.

His best known work is Backyard Ballistics, which according to Newsweek magazine, has sold hundreds of thousands of copies. Other popular titles are Absinthe and Flamethrowers, and The Art of the Catapult. In 2011, Publishers Weekly stated Gurstelle had sold more than 300,000 of his books.

According to James A. Buczynski in Library Journal, Gurstelle's writing "balances scientific explanations of the technologies with profiles of the people who [explore] them."

== Expertise ==
Gurstelle’s academic focus centers on the intersection of history, technology, and science. His academic works explore the history of vernacular (i.e. popular) science writing as well as understanding the effects of such texts on culture and society. He advocates for the use of re-creation and experimentation techniques as a possible source of historical knowledge regarding the history of technology and science.

== Selected bibliography ==
- Gurstelle, William (2001). Backyard Ballistics : build potato cannons, paper match rockets, Cincinnati fire kites, tennis ball mortars, and more dynamite devices. Chicago: Chicago Review Press. ISBN 978-1-55652-375-5. OCLC 45861947.
- Gurstelle, William (2003). Building bots : designing and building warrior robots. Chicago: Chicago Review Press. ISBN 978-1-55652-459-2. OCLC 301058633.
- Gurstelle, William (2004). The art of the catapult : build Greek ballistae, Roman onagers, English trebuchets, and more ancient artillery. Chicago: Chicago Review Press. ISBN 978-1-55652-526-1. OCLC 54529037. ISBN 1-55652-526-5. ISBN 978-1-4176-4323-3. ISBN 1-4176-4323-4.
- Gurstelle, William (2006). Adventures from the technology underground : catapults, pulsejets, rail guns, flamethrowers, tesla coils, air cannons and the garage warriors who love them. New York: Clarkson Potter. ISBN 978-1-4000-5082-6. OCLC 61115533.
- Gurstelle, William (2007). Whoosh boom splat : the garage warrior's guide to building projectile shooters from potato cannons to pulsejets and beyond. New York: Three Rivers Press. ISBN 978-0-307-33948-5. OCLC 70054192.
- Gurstelle, William (2009). Absinthe & flamethrowers : projects and ruminations on the art of living dangerously. Chicago: Chicago Review Press. ISBN 978-1-55652-822-4. OCLC 273817829. ISBN 1-55652-822-1.
- Gurstelle, William (2011). The Practical Pyromaniac. Chicago: Chicago Review Press. ISBN 978-1-56976-710-8. OCLC 690086844. ISBN 1-56976-710-6.
- Gurstelle, William (2022). “Force” Review: Physics at Its Simplest. Wall Street Journal - Online Edition, [s. l.], p. N.PAG, 26 nov. 2022
