= David A. Westbrook =

German-born American legal expert

David Albert Westbrook
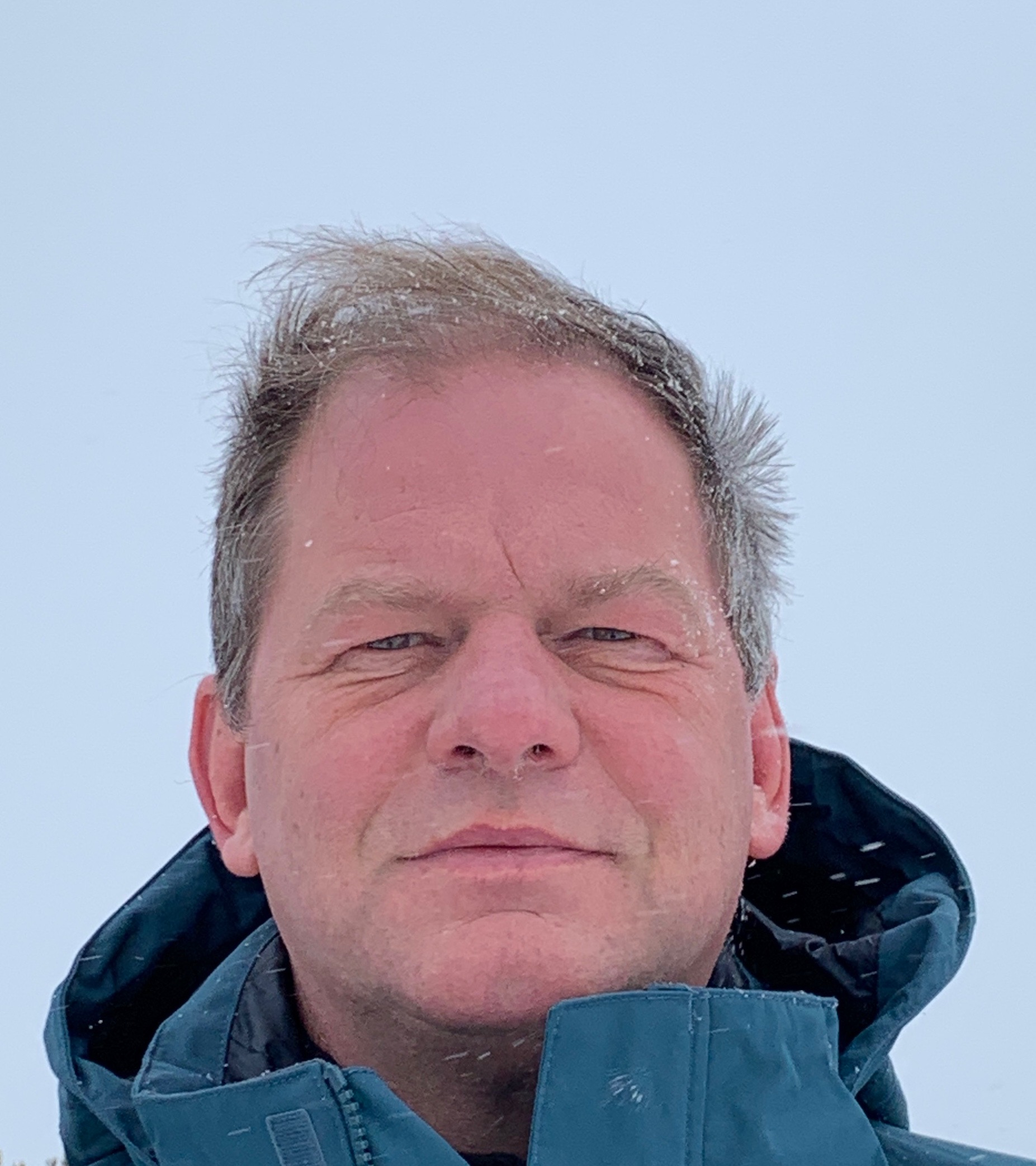
- Born: January 18, 1965 (age 61)
- Other name: Bert Westbrook
- Occupations: Legal expert, academic and author
- Title: Louis A. Del Cotto Professor

Academic background
- Education: B.A., German Studies; J.D.
- Alma mater: Emory University; Harvard Law School
- Website: https://www.davidawestbrook.com/

David Albert Westbrook is a German-born American author, academic and legal expert. He is Louis A. Del Cotto professor and co-directs the NYC Program in Finance and Law at the University at Buffalo School of Law, State University of New York.

Westbrook writes on the social and intellectual consequences of contemporary political economy as expressed in corporations and finance, international law, globalization and social theory. Westbrook has authored several books including City Of Gold: An Apology for Global Capitalism in a Time of Discontent, Navigators of the Contemporary: Why Ethnography Matters, and Getting Through Security: Counterterrorism, Bureaucracy, and a Sense of the Modern.

During the 2008 financial crisis, Westbrook spoke about political economy and the fragilities of capitalism in China, Pakistan, Jamaica, Brazil and Portugal.

== Education ==
Westbrook received his B.A. degree in German Studies in 1988 from Emory University, where he was a Woodruff Scholar. He studied with and worked as a Research Associate for Harold J. Berman at Emory University Law School. In 1992, he received his J.D. degree from Harvard Law School, where he was a Ford Fellow in Public International Law. Westbrook wrote his thesis and was a teaching assistant for Mary Ann Glendon.

== Career ==
Westbrook clerked at the United States Court of Appeals for the Federal Circuit from 1993 till 1995 for Judge S. Jay Plager and then worked as an associate at Wilmer Cutler Pickering Hale and Dorr. He joined the University at Buffalo School of Law, State University of New York, as an associate professor in 1998 and was promoted to professor in 2004. During his term at the university, Westbrook was appointed as Floyd H. and Hilda L. Hurst Faculty Scholar from 2007 till 2013. He became Louis A. Del Cotto Professor in 2013.

== Scholarship ==
Westbrook has conducted research on corporations and finance, international law and globalization, political economy and social theory. He has also published various works on the significance of developments in the equity markets and corporate governance, in order to facilitate understanding of commercial society.

=== Political economy ===
Westbrook has researched on political economy and discussed the contextual changes in politics and highlighted how globalization affected the law. In the early 2010s, he authored a paper discussing the economy of North Atlantic countries and highlighted the presented approaches for collective thinking and decision making. Westbrook focused on three movements and discussed the various methods for forming an elite consensus along with the relevant major conceptual obstacles.

Westbrook published his book, City Of Gold: An Apology for Global Capitalism in a Time of Discontent in 2003. The book was reviewed as "a powerful demonstration of the limits at which global capitalism may be seen as an effective and efficient way of organizing economic interaction in our cosmopolitan society." According to E. Fuat Keyman, "In City of Gold, Westbrook makes a significant contribution to the literature on globalization by going beyond a purely market-based or a state-centric analysis of social change".

=== Corporations and finance ===
After the 2008 financial crisis, Westbrook focused on the failures of classical economic thought, and discussed new ways to regulate financial markets

In 2010, Westbrook published his book, Out of Crisis: Rethinking Our Financial Markets', which was reviewed as "a fascinating new book" which "is a compelling and entertaining diatribe against some of the sacred cows of finance." Mae Kuykendall reviewed that "Westbrook draws on his wide knowledge of law, finance, literary theory, cultural anthropology, and political history to guide us through our recent disaster."

Westbrook's work on corporations and finance also includes his book, Between Citizen and State: An Introduction to the Corporation.

=== International law ===
Westbrook has also conducted research on international law, focusing especially on security, environment, and Islam. He focused on sustainable development and discussed the visions of history and the pragmatism of environmentalists. He presented his ideas regarding sustainability and stressed upon sustainable development as a pragmatic concept.

In 2011, Westbrook published Deploying Ourselves: Islamist Violence, Globalization, and the Responsible Projection of U.S. Force.

== Bibliography ==
=== Books ===
- City Of Gold: An Apology for Global Capitalism in a Time of Discontent (2003) ISBN 9780203493809
- Between Citizen and State: An Introduction to the Corporation (2007) ISBN 9781594514043
- Navigators of the Contemporary: Why Ethnography Matters (2009) ISBN 9780226887531
- Out of Crisis: Rethinking Our Financial Markets (2010) ISBN 9781594517266
- Deploying Ourselves: Islamist Violence, Globalization, and the Responsible Projection of U.S. Force (2011) ISBN 9781317261322
- Welcome to New Country: Music for Today's America (2017) ISBN 9781549976988
- Getting Through Security: Counterterrorism, Bureaucracy, and a Sense of the Modern (2020) ISBN 9781000217513

=== Selected articles ===
- Westbrook, A. D., & Westbrook, D. A. (2018). Snapchat's Gift: Equity Culture in High-Tech Firms. Fla. St. UL Rev., 46, 861.
- Westbrook, D. A., & Maguire, M. (2019). Those People [May Yet Be] a Kind of Solution Late Imperial Thoughts on the Humanization of Officialdom. Buff. L. Rev., 67, 889.
- Westbrook, A. D., & Westbrook, D. A. (2017). Unicorns, Guardians, and the Concentration of the US Equity Markets. Neb. L. Rev., 96, 688.
- Westbrook, D. A. (2017). The paradigm sways: Macroeconomics turns to history. Westbrook, DA (2017), The Paradigm Sways: Macroeconomics Turns to History. Int Finance, 20, 2016–047.
- "Critical Issues for Qualitative Research," last chapter in The Sage Handbook of Qualitative Research, 5th ed., (Norman Denzin and Yvonna Lincoln, eds.), ch. 41, pp. 915-922 (2017).
- Westbrook, D. A. (2016). Losing our manners: The current crisis and possible durability of liberal discourse.
