= Wang Ning (linguist) =

Chinese linguist

Wang Ning (Chinese: 王宁; born 1936), a native of Haining, Zhejiang Province, is a Chinese linguist and professor at Beijing Normal University.

She studied under the linguist Lu Zongda (Chinese: 陆宗达), and her main research interests include exegesis, philology, and the semantics of Chinese vocabulary. She has led the development of the General Standardized Chinese Character List, and has devoted herself to the education and promotion of Chinese characters.
