= South Atlantic Quarterly =

- Language: English

Publication details
- History: 1901–present
- Publisher: Duke University Press
- Frequency: Quarterly

Standard abbreviations
- ISO 4: South Atl. Q.

Indexing
- ISSN: 0038-2876 (print); 1527-8026 (web)

The South Atlantic Quarterly is an American little magazine founded by John Spencer Bassett, a history professor at Trinity College, in 1901. The magazine published articles about southern history and, following the example of the Sewanee Review, also tackled topics dealing with the issue of race in the South.
