= Anna Kornbluh =

American author and literary scholar

Anna Kornbluh is an American author and literary scholar. She is a professor of Victorian literature and critical theory at the University of Illinois Chicago. Her most well-known book is Immediacy, or The Style of Too Late Capitalism (2024).

== Education ==
Anna Kornbluh studied political science at Macalester College in St. Paul, Minnesota, graduating with a BA in 1999. Kornbluh earned a master's degree in film studies and critical pedagogy from the University of California, Los Angeles, in 2001 and a master's degree in English from the University of California, Irvine, in 2004. Kornbluh received her PhD from UC Irvine in 2007.

== Career ==
She joined the University of Illinois Chicago as an assistant professor of English in 2008, became associate professor in 2014, and professor of Victorian literature and critical theory in 2020, and is also associate head of the English department.

Kornbluh authored Immediacy, or The Style of Too Late Capitalism (2024), which was released with Verso Books and received a positive critical response.

== Books ==
- Kornbluh, Anna (2019). The Order of Forms: Realism, Formalism, and Social Space. University of Chicago Press. ISBN 978-0-226-65348-8.
- Kornbluh, Anna (2019). Marxist Film Theory and Fight Club. Film theory in practice. New York: Bloomsbury Academic. ISBN 978-1-5013-4730-6.
- Kornbluh, Anna (2024). Immediacy, or The Style of Too Late Capitalism. Verso. ISBN 978-1-80429-134-4.
