= Modern Fiction Studies =

Journal

- Discipline: Literature
- Language: English
- Edited by: Robert P. Marzec & Maren Linett

Publication details
- History: 1955–present
- Publisher: Johns Hopkins University Press for the Purdue University English Department (United States)
- Frequency: Quarterly

Standard abbreviations
- ISO 4: Mod. Fict. Stud.

Indexing
- ISSN: 0026-7724 (print); 1080-658X (web)
- LCCN: 56000651
- OCLC no.: 1645443

Links
- Journal homepage; Online access

Modern Fiction Studies is a peer-reviewed academic journal established in 1955 at Purdue University's Department of English, where it is still edited. It publishes general and themed issues on the topic of modernist and contemporary fiction using original research from literary scholars. It seeks to challenge and expand the perception of "modern fiction". Special issues may focus on a specific topic or author. For example, previous issues have featured Toni Morrison and J. R. R. Tolkien. The journal also includes book reviews. The current editor in chief is Robert P. Marzec (Purdue University). The journal is published by Johns Hopkins University Press and appears quarterly in March, June, September, and December. Circulation is 2,265 and the average length of an issue is 284 pages.

== Abstracting and indexing ==
This journal is indexed and abstracted by the following services:

- Arts & Humanities Citation Index
- Current Contents - Arts & Humanities
- SCOPUS

== See also ==
- Modernist literature
