= Cultural Critique =

- Discipline: Cultural studies
- Language: English
- Edited by: Cesare Casarino, John Mowitt, Simona Sawhney, Maggie Hennefeld

Publication details
- History: 1985–present
- Publisher: University of Minnesota Press (United States)
- Frequency: Quarterly

Standard abbreviations
- ISO 4: Cult. Crit.

Indexing
- ISSN: 0882-4371 (print); 1460-2458 (web)

Links
- Journal homepage; Online access; Online archive

Cultural Critique is a quarterly peer-reviewed academic journal published across the fields of cultural studies, literary theory, political science, philosophy, and sociology. It was founded in 1985 and is published by the University of Minnesota Press. The journal is currently edited by John Mowitt, Cesare Casarino, Simona Sawhney, Maggie Hennefeld and Frieda Ekotto.

== Abstracting and indexing ==
The journal is abstracted and indexed in the following bibliographic databases:

- Arts & Humanities Citation Index
- Humanities Abstracts
- IBZ Online
- International Bibliography of the Social Sciences
- MLA - Modern Language Association Database
- Periodicals Index Online
- Political Science Complete
- Scopus
- Social Sciences Citation Index

== Israeli scholar discrimination controversy ==
Amidst the Gaza war in 2024 Cultural Critique was forced to issue a public apology for rejecting a contribution by an Israeli scholar solely on the basis of his assumed institutional affiliation in Israel. The journal had rejected the scholar's submission in a letter which stated, "We regret to inform you that we cannot consider your submission for publication due to the journal's commitment to BDS guidelines, which includes 'withdrawing support from Israel's ... cultural and academic institutions.'" The scholar replied that, as the biography attached to his submission had made clear, he had no affiliation to Israeli institutions, and argued that Cultural Critique had turned his paper down solely on the basis of his nationality; this despite even the BDS guidelines themselves explicitly opposing the boycott of individuals. Cultural Critique reportedly replied that they could not verify his non-Israeli affiliation and would only reconsider his rejection should he provide evidence of this being the case.

Following publicity as well as a threat of legal action against its publisher, the University of Minnesota, for violating anti-discrimination legislation and Minnesota's anti-BDS law, as well as a porported investigation by the United States Department of Education Office for Civil Rights, both the University of Minnesota and Cultural Critique apologized for the incident. The journal claimed to have "mistakenly excluded from consideration an article submitted by a scholar on the basis of their university affiliation." Cultural Critique announced that should the author choose to resubmit his piece, it would now be reviewed "using our normal processes."
