= Martial law (disambiguation) =

Martial law is the imposition of military rule.

Martial law may also refer to:

- Martial Law (TV series), a late 1990s television series
- Martial Law (1991 film), the 1990 film starring David Carradine
- Martial Law 2: Undercover, 1991 film

Marshal or Marshall law may refer to:

- Marshall Law, a fictional character in the Tekken series
- Marshal Law (comics)
- Marshal Law, the 1996 film starring Jimmy Smits
- Marshall Law (TV series), an Australian television series

== See also ==
- Marshall Plan, American initiative to aid Western Europe after World War II
