= Firepower (disambiguation) =

Firepower is a military concept rooted in the ability to direct a heavy weight of metal onto the enemy or enemy possession.

Fire power or Firepower may also refer to:

== Film and TV ==
- Firepower (1979 film), a crime film starring Sophia Loren, James Coburn, O.J. Simpson, Eli Wallach and Victor Mature
- Firepower (1993 film), an action film starring Chad McQueen, Gary Daniels and Jim Hellwig
- "Firepower", an episode of Discovery Channel series Future Weapons

== Books ==
- Firepower (comics), a Marvel Comics supervillain
- Firepower: The Most Spectacular Fraud in Australian History, investigative book by Gerard Ryle into the Firepower fuel pill fraud
- Fire Power (comic book), an Image Comics series by Robert Kirkman and Chris Samnee

== Games ==
- Firepower (pinball), a 1980 pinball game designed by Steve Ritchie and released by Williams
- Fire Power (video game), a tank action game for the Amiga and DOS
- Firepower (computer game), an expansion pack for Microsoft's Combat Flight Simulator 3: Battle for Europe

== Music ==
=== Albums ===
- Fire Power, a 1978 album by Legs Diamond
- Firepower, a 1984 album by Chateaux
- Firepower (album), a 2018 album by Judas Priest

=== Songs ===
- "Firepower", a song by Robert Fripp from The First Day
- "FirePower", a song by Raven from their 1982 album Wiped Out
- "Firepower", a song by Bamboo Mañalac from Bless This Mess
- "Firepower", a song from Put It On sampled by Datsik
- "Fire Power", a song by American electronic artist Wolfgang Gartner from his 2009 single "Fire Power/Latin Fever"

== Other ==
- Cisco Firepower, a proprietary next-generation firewall
- Fire power station, a fossil fuel power station
- Firepower – The Royal Artillery Museum, a military museum in Woolwich, London, England
- Chrysler Firepower, a Dodge Viper-based concept car produced under the Chrysler brand
- Firepower International, an Australian fraud case
- Manny Pacquiao vs. Miguel Cotto, a 2009 boxing event
