= John Sjogren =

John Sjogren may refer to:

- John C. Sjogren, Medal of Honor recipient
- John M. Sjogren, American film director
