= Darryl Henriques =

Jamaican actor (born 1942)

- Born: January 28, 1942 (age 84); Jamaica
- Occupation: Author • satirist • stand-up comedian • actor
- Years active: 1967-present

Darryl Henriques (born January 28, 1942) is an author, satirist, stand-up comedian, and actor on stage and radio, and in TV and film.

== Early life ==
Henriques was born in Jamaica on January 28, 1942.

== Career ==
Henriques, a Cheese Board Collective worker, coined the phrase Gourmet Ghetto.

Darryl Henriques joined the San Francisco Mime Troupe in 1967, later El Teatro Campesino, the East Bay Sharks (street theater) and the Bread and Puppet Theater.

KSAN (1968 to 1980) Scoop Nisker's Last News Show news comedy characters included: Joe Carcinogenni, Rattus Rat, Jacques Kissmatoe, Rev. Clyde Fingerdip and The Swami From Miami. VIDEOWEST cable access show was hosted by Scoop Nisker with Henriques, Laura Daltry, Joe Lerer, and Jane Dornacker.

He appeared in FTA Show, Star Trek: The Next Generation, Star Trek VI, Jumanji (1995) and the Star Wars franchise.

On October 27, 1936, the play It Can't Happen Here opened in 22 theaters in 18 cities across the USA. Henriques initiated the 2011 national readings, mostly on Monday, October 24, co-sponsored by the San Francisco Mime Troupe and Dell'Arte International School of Physical Theatre in Blue Lake, California.

== Personal life ==
Henriques left the San Francisco Bay Area for the Los Angeles area in 1984.

== Filmography ==
Film
Year	Title	Role	Notes
1982	Citizen		
1983	The Right Stuff	Life Reporter	
1984	Crackers	Irate Motorist	
1984	Best Defense	Col. Zayas, San Salvador	
1986	Down and Out in Beverly Hills	Geraldo	
1986	A Fine Mess	Landlord	
1987	Dutch Treat	Sushi Waiter	
1987	Beverly Hills Cop II	Maitre d' at 385	
1987	No Way Out	C.I.D. Man	
1988	Vibes	Ricardo	
1989	Police Academy 6: City Under Siege	Man in a Hurry	
1991	The Rocketeer	G-Man	
1991	Star Trek VI: The Undiscovered Country	Ambassador Nanclus	
1994	The Unborn 2	Artie Philips	
1995	Jumanji	Gun Salesman	
1999	The Thirteenth Floor	Cab Driver	
1999	Buddy Boy	Doctor	
2001	Just Visiting	Monk	

== Bibliography ==
- Henriques, Darryl (1990). 50 Simple Things You Can Do to Pave the Earth. Ulysses Press. ISBN 978-0-915233-31-1. OCLC 22975079.

== See also ==
- The Unborn 2
- Citizen: I'm Not Losing My Mind, I'm Giving It Away
- Gourmet Ghetto
- Suspicion Song
- Ray's Male Heterosexual Dance Hall
- Wicket W. Warrick
- The Last Outpost (Star Trek: The Next Generation)
- San Francisco Comedy Competition
- Live Shot
- William Farley (director)
- Caravan of Courage: An Ewok Adventure
- Villa Alegre (TV series)
- Paul Krassner
- Warwick Davis filmography
- Alice Kahn
- List of Star Trek characters (N–S)
- FTA Show
- Joe Carcione
