= Table for Five =

1983 film by Robert Lieberman

- Theatrical release poster
- Directed by: Robert Lieberman
- Written by: David Seltzer
- Produced by: Robert Schaffel
- Starring: Jon Voight; Marie-Christine Barrault; Millie Perkins; Richard Crenna
- Cinematography: Vilmos Zsigmond
- Edited by: Michael Kahn
- Music by: Miles Goodman and John Morris
- Production company: CBS Theatrical Films
- Distributed by: Warner Bros. Pictures
- Release date: February 18, 1983
- Running time: 122 minutes
- Country: United States
- Language: English
- Budget: $10 million
- Box office: $2,439,705

Table for Five is a 1983 American drama film directed by Robert Lieberman and starring Jon Voight and Richard Crenna.

== Plot ==
J.P. Tannen is a former professional golfer living in California who is estranged from his three children. The children live in New York with their mother, Kathleen and stepfather, attorney Mitchell. Hoping to reconnect with his children, Tannen decides to take them on a Mediterranean cruise. Tannen, who still has feelings for Kathleen, wants her to believe he has changed, but she remains unconvinced.

On the cruise, Tannen is often distracted by the prospect of meeting women, including French archaeologist Marie. He frequently leaves the children to entertain themselves. He reserves a table for five in the dining room, secretly hoping to find an adult female companion for the fifth seat.

Tannen's youngest son Truman-Paul has a learning disability, which Tannen impatiently tries to push him to overcome. His adopted oldest son Trung is caught stealing food from the ship's galley and attempting to order drinks with a fake ID. Their sister Tilde is sensible and sensitive but too young to act as a parental figure for the boys.

Tannen begins to feel inadequate as a traditional father, suggesting that the children think of him as a "friend" and even call him "J.P." The trip temporarily improves at the ship's first port of call, Rome. The family enjoys time together and Marie is impressed by Tannen's seemingly caring interactions with his children.

However, while en route to the next stop, Athens, Tannen receives devastating news. Kathleen has been killed in a car accident in New York while taking the family dog to the vet. Grief-stricken, he meets Mitchell in Athens. Mitchell explains that he proceeded with Kathleen's burial and flew to Europe to escort the children home, where a memorial service would be held later. Tannen insists on telling the children himself and asks for more time. Mitchell attempts to dissuade him but ultimately agrees to leave the children with their father for a while longer.

The ship proceeds to Cairo. While the children are sightseeing, Tannen meets with Mitchell again in a local tavern and reveals he is considering pursuing full custody of the children. Their conversation escalates into a heated argument. Mitchell points out Tannen's history as an absentee parent, noting he doesn't even know the names of his children's friends or teachers. He hints at knowledge of Tannen's unsuccessful business dealings and vows to use his legal expertise to ruin him. Tannen confesses to Marie the truth about how little time he has spent with his children over the years. Marie joins the family on a trip to the Pyramids. It is there that Tannen finally breaks down and informs the children of Kathleen's death. The children are devastated.

At the next stop, Tunis, Trung runs away. He takes the first launch to shore, intending to make his way back to the U.S. Tilde tells Tannen that Trung has a history of running away, another fact Tannen was unaware of. They find him in a marketplace and catch up to him after a chase. Tannen forces Trung to open up and Trung angrily tells him he needs Tannen as a father, not a "friend."

Mitchell is waiting in Genoa, prepared to take the children back to the United States and their home. As gently as possible, Tannen informs Mitchell that he is keeping them. He then recites a list of the children's friends and teachers, demonstrating his determination to be more involved in their lives.

== Cast ==
- Jon Voight as James Paul "J.P." Tannen
- Richard Crenna as Mitchell
- Marie-Christine Barrault as Marie
- Millie Perkins as Kathleen
- Roxana Zal as Matilde "Tilde" Tannen
- Robby Kiger as Truman-Paul Tannen
- Son Hoang Bui as Trung Tannen
- Maria O'Brien as Mandy
- Nelson Welch as Old Man
- Bernie Hern as Bickering Husband
- Moria Turner as Bickering Wife
- Kevin Costner as Newlywed Husband
- Cynthia Kania as Newlywed Wife
- Marion Russell as Odessa
- Gustaf Unger as Twin
- Bertil Unger as Twin

== Production ==
The film was shot extensively on location. Cruise scenes were filmed aboard the MS Vistafjord at sea during a voyage. Other scenes were shot on in Rome, Athens and at the Giza pyramids. Kevin Costner has a small role as a newlywed passenger on the ship.

== Release ==
Table for Five was released in the United States on February 18, 1983. In the Philippines, the film was retitled The Champ: Second Chance to associate it with Jon Voight's unrelated earlier film The Champ and premiered on December 16, 1987.
