= John M. Sjogren =

American film director (born 1966)

- Born: April 4, 1966 (age 58); United States
- Occupation: Film director

John Mark Sjogren (born 4 April 1966) is an American film director.

Raised in La Cañada, California, John Sjogren's films have included actors including Corey Feldman, Todd Bridges, Dom DeLuise, and Roxana Zal.

== Career ==
Californian native Sjogren's movie-making career started in 1979. Sjogren's feature length directorial debut was entitled "Disturbing The Peace" (1988). A decade long Director/Producer partnership with Scott Ziehl, saw Sjogren and Ziehl alternate in the roles and even take dual responsibilities. This collaboration resulted in the production of the films "Boiler Room", "Squanderers" (starring Chad McQueen and Don Swayze), "The Mosaic Project", and "Red Line".

== Filmography ==
- Red Line (1995)
- Perseguidos pela Mafia "the Thief & the Stripper" (2000)
- Choke (2001)
- Welcome to America (2002)
- The Lights (2003)
- Jet Set (2013)
