= Joe Carcione =

American activist (1914–1988)

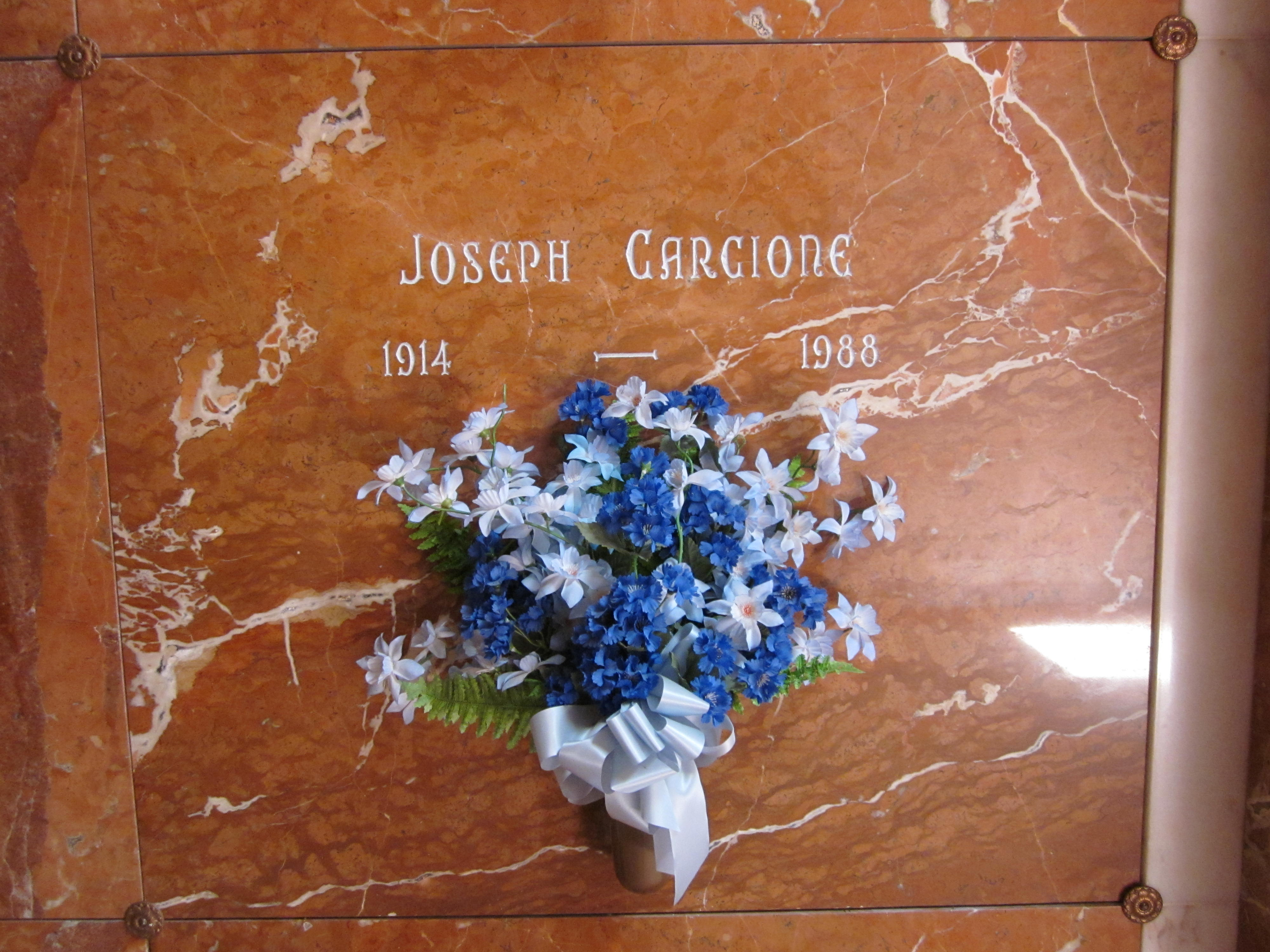
Carcione's vault at Holy Cross Cemetery

Joseph Carcione (/kɑːrˈtʃoʊni/ kar-CHOH-nee; October 31, 1914 – August 2, 1988) was a consumer advocate known as "the Green Grocer."

== Golden Gate Produce Terminal ==
Carcione owned and operated a produce import/export business at the Golden Gate Produce Terminal II in South San Francisco, one of the three Bay Area Wholesale Produce Markets, the others being, Oakland Wholesale Produce Market, and San Francisco Wholesale Produce Market.

== Television and Radio ==
Carcione got his start doing radio commercials for his produce business in 1967, when he was discovered by KCBS radio announcer Dave McElhatton. He went on to host short television and radio bits offering advice in the world of produce, and wrote a newspaper column and two books on the subject. The Greengrocer television news feature was produced on location at the Golden Gate Produce Terminal and syndicated throughout the United States and Canada. Commercial television stations contracted with Mighty Minute Programs of San Francisco to obtain the exclusive rights to broadcast Joe Carcione's Greengrocer report on a market-by-market basis. In some television markets, the feature was sponsored by grocery stores interested in associating with The Greengrocer. Joe in the summer of 1977 did several segments on seedless watermelons. The watermelon growers association in Missouri convinced 2 affiliates to cancel his segments.

== Personal life ==
Carcione married Madeline Ahern in 1937. They had three children. He died of intestinal cancer at Peninsula Hospital in Burlingame, California on August 2, 1988 and was entombed at Holy Cross Cemetery in Colma, California.

He was well known for, among other things, a dish called the "Joe Carcione Special", which consisted of shredded cabbage in place of pasta, sauteed with onion and garlic, and topped with marinara sauce and grated cheese.

== In popular culture ==
Darryl Henriques parodied him as Joe Carcinogenni on KSAN (1968 to 1980).

The Simpsons S10E17 makes reference to "The Red Grocer", a meat-focused play on Carcione's show.
