= Alice Kahn =

American writer (born 1943)

Alice Joyce Kahn (born 1943) is an American nurse practitioner and humorist who popularized the slang word "yuppie", describing young urban professionals, and also the term "Gourmet Ghetto", naming an influential retail neighborhood of Berkeley, California. Kahn was a regular contributor to East Bay Express, a columnist at the San Francisco Chronicle, and a syndicated columnist at the Los Angeles Times. She has also written for Mother Jones magazine and the San Jose Mercury News. A self-professed "sit-down comic" noted for her "Jewish-American wit", her understated brand of humor has been compared to that of Erma Bombeck. The Chicago Reader commented on her liberal political viewpoint, writing that she was "Joan Rivers with a social conscience."

== Early life and career ==
Kahn was born Alice Joyce Nelson and raised in West Side, Chicago, in the Lawndale neighborhood. Her outgoing, debonair father was Herman Nelson, and her mother was the former Idelle Avonovitch, a comparatively sheltered young woman from a shtetl in the Suwałki Region of Poland. Kahn had one older sister named Myrna Lou Nelson. Kahn's parents were Orthodox Jews but they advised their girls to follow more modern practices. She attended Senn High School, where she met Edward Paul Kahn, her future husband. She enrolled in 1961 at the University of Illinois Urbana-Champaign. After two years, she changed to Columbia University in New York, earning a degree in writing in 1965. Edward said he was heading west to UC Berkeley for graduate studies in economics, and she joined him in Berkeley, enrolling at San Francisco State to earn a teaching credential. They married in August 1966.

Kahn taught high school English for three years in San Lorenzo. In 1969, she quit in advance of being laid off because of school district downsizing. She started working at the Berkeley Free Clinic, and was encouraged to become a nurse. In 1973 she enrolled at California State University, Hayward, to become a registered nurse, working with the Alameda County Public Health Department. She returned to SF State to get a nurse practitioner degree in 1976, and took a position at a medical group in Berkeley.

== Writing ==
Kahn wrote an article using the "Gourmet Ghetto" moniker to describe the influential retail neighborhood of Berkeley previously called North Berkeley. The area was known as a hotbed for fine foods beginning in the 1970s because it held the first Peet's Coffee location, the Cheese Board Collective, a Berkeley Food Co-op grocery store, Chez Panisse restaurant, and other specialty food shops. In 1975, the Cheese Board began selling fresh-baked bread, bringing more customers to the neighborhood. Kahn shopped at the Cheese Board, and she wrote an article that popularized the term "Gourmet Ghetto". Various origin stories exist for the term "gourmet ghetto": Kahn said that she did not coin the term. One apocryphal story is that columnist Herb Caen used the term, but if so, he did not write it down. Cheese Board employee–co-owner L. John Harris remembers that a fellow collectivist named Darryl Henriques used "gourmet ghetto" in a comedy routine he delivered with his street theater troupe East Bay Sharks at The Freight and Salvage in the 1970s; Harris guesses that Kahn heard Henriques use the term before she used it herself in her writings. (Henriques later moved to Los Angeles to act in comedies, and played a gun salesman in the 1995 film Jumanji.) By 1980 the nickname was widely established: writer and editor Sandra Rosenzweig wrote about Northern California restaurants for Clay Felker's New West magazine based in Los Angeles, saying that Rosenthal's deli was "Located in the heart of Berkeley's gourmet ghetto – next door to Cocolat and half a block from Chez Panisse".

Kahn took inspiration from the 1983 Roz Chast comic "Attack of the Young Professionals!"

In early 1983, Kahn began writing an article about young urban professionals named Dirk and Brie, a satirical faux-sociological study. She coined the word "yuppie" for the article, basing it on the word "yups" appearing in the Chicago Reader, and on a New Yorker magazine cartoon by Roz Chast titled "Attack of the Young Professionals!", published in April 1983. She was unaware the word yuppie had been used earlier. She published her satirical piece in the East Bay Express on June 10, 1983, about ten weeks after Bob Greene put the word in his Chicago Tribune column on March 23. Kahn's piece was a more thorough description, more definitive, and after it was reprinted by other publications, it served to popularize the term to a greater degree.

After accepting the offer of a free ticket to see the Grateful Dead at the Greek Theatre in Berkeley, Kahn reviewed their July 1984 concert, writing in the East Bay Express how she pictured Jerry Garcia as the "hippie abominable snowman". Garcia liked her review and asked Kahn to come to his house in San Rafael to interview him, at the same time refusing an interview request from the Today show. Kahn arrived to find Garcia very high on some substance (a condition she easily recognized from her nurse training) and she thought he would be a terrible interview subject. He was quite coherent, however, and Kahn recorded the interview on cassette tape, with Garcia talking about his childhood and his passion for music. Kahn edited the interview and published the piece in West magazine at the end of 1984: "Jerry Garcia and the Call of the Weird". Kahn received $1200 from West but she gave almost all of it to Dennis McNally, the publicist of the Grateful Dead, because she had accidentally damaged his car with her own as she left Garcia's house. Kahn's piece was reprinted several times, appearing in books about Garcia and the Grateful Dead. In 2019, the cassette tape was digitized for streaming online so that fans could hear the full interview for the first time.

== Personal life ==
Kahn lives in the Berkeley Hills with her husband, Edward P. Kahn, PhD., an economist in the field of energy sources and consumption. They have two daughters, Emma and Hannah.

== Books ==
- 1985 – Multiple Sarcasm, Ten Speed Press
- 1987 – My Life as a Gal, Delacorte
- 1990 – Luncheon at the Cafe Ridiculous, Poseidon Press
- 1991 – Fun with Dirk and Bree, Poseidon Press. ISBN 978-0671691516
- 1997 – Your Joke is in the E-Mail: Cyberlaffs from Mousepotatoes, with John Dobby Boe. Ten Speed Press. ISBN 978-0898159882
