= Something About Amelia =

1984 American TV movie

- Genre: Drama
- Written by: William Hanley
- Directed by: Randa Haines
- Starring: Ted Danson; Glenn Close; Roxana Zal; Missy Francis
- Music by: Mark Snow
- Country of origin: United States
- Original language: English

Production
- Executive producer: Leonard Goldberg
- Producer: Michele Rappaport
- Cinematography: Edward R. Brown
- Editor: Jack Harnish
- Running time: 100 minutes
- Production companies: ABC; The Leonard Goldberg Company

Original release
- Network: ABC
- Release: January 9, 1984

Something About Amelia is a 1984 television film about psychological trauma caused in a family by a father's molestation of his daughter.

The film stars Ted Danson, Glenn Close, Roxana Zal, and Missy Francis.

It was the most-watched network television show in the United States for the week of January 9–15, 1984 with a 31.6 rating and 46 share, and an estimated audience of 17.1 million viewers.

The movie marked one of the first times the taboo at the time topic of incest was addressed in such a public way, seen by a broad US and international audience.

It received eight Emmy nominations in 1984, and won in three categories, for Outstanding Drama/Comedy Special (Leonard Goldberg / Michele Rappaport), Outstanding Supporting Actress in a Limited Series (Roxana Zal) and for Outstanding Writing in a Limited Series or a Special (William Hanley).

The movie was also nominated for four Golden Globes and won two, for Best Miniseries or Television Film and for Best Performance by an Actor in a Limited Series or a Motion Picture Made for Television (Ted Danson).

== Plot summary ==
Thirteen-year-old Amelia Bennett lives with her parents, Steven and Gail, and her ten-year-old sister, Beth, in a comfortable home in a respectable middle-class suburb. Steven and Gail both hold office jobs and on the surface, they are a perfectly normal family. However, from the start, there are hints that things are not quite what they seem: Gail appears to have a slight drinking problem, and she and Steven are simply going through the motions with their marriage; later on in the film, Steven admits he cannot even remember the last time he and Gail said they loved each other.

Over the past two years, Amelia has become increasingly withdrawn and depressed, and her grades have steadily declined. Gail assumes Amelia is simply being a moody teenage girl, however, shame and fear have kept Amelia silent about the sexual molestation she has been suffering at the hands of her father for the past few years. After Steven discovers Amelia is attending a school dance with a boy from her class and the boy has asked Amelia on a date the following Friday, Steven exhibits jealous behavior akin to that of a husband or boyfriend, rather than her father. After attempting to discourage Amelia from dating boys her age, telling her "no one can like you as much as I do", Amelia starts to believe that Steven might harm her younger sister in similar ways. Going to school she unburdens herself of her awful secret to her guidance counselor, Mrs. Hall.

Horrified at Amelia's revelation, Mrs. Hall contacts Amelia's mother, takes her home and reveals what Amelia has told her. Confronted with this horrifying piece of news, Gail refuses to believe it is true; she calls Amelia a liar and orders Mrs. Hall to leave. Mrs. Hall notifies the police, who take Amelia into protective custody and assign her a social worker, Ruth Walters, who takes Amelia to a children's home. Ruth insists to Amelia that she has done nothing wrong and that she is the victim.

Steven comes home, unaware of what has happened, and finds a shell-shocked Gail waiting for him. She tells him what Amelia has said and he professes his innocence. He goes to the police station and demands to speak to Amelia, but is told he is not allowed any access to his daughter and will be charged for child abuse. Gail visits the children's home and demands to take Amelia home, but Ruth says that it is not possible as long as Steven remains at home and that a hearing will commence shortly.

Steven is ordered to leave the family home during the inquest. Once Amelia returns home, Gail is forced to accept Amelia is telling the truth, and struggles with a bitter feeling of jealousy that her husband wanted her daughter more than he wanted her, as their marriage has been stagnant for years. Beth is also made to realize that she was her father's next intended victim, and the family is shaken to the core. Steven sneaks back to the home to try and reason with Gail. Gail confronts him that she knows Amelia is not lying and that Steven has to tell the truth or risk imprisonment. Gail tells Steven she hates him, and Steven does show remorse for his actions.

Through therapy, the family attempts to rebuild their shattered lives. However, the film ends with many unresolved issues.

== Cast ==
- Ted Danson as Steven Bennett
- Glenn Close as Gail Bennett
- Olivia Cole as Ruth Walters
- Roxana Zal as Amelia Bennett
- Lane Smith as Officer Dealy
- Jane Kaczmarek as Mrs. Hall
- Missy Francis as Beth Bennett
- Kevin Conway as Dr. Kevin Farley

== See also ==
- 1984 in film
- 1984 in American television
- Incest in film and television
