= George Murdock (actor) =

American actor (1930–2012

- Murdock in Struck by Lightning, 1979
- Born: George Sawaya, Jr. June 25, 1930; Salina, Kansas, U.S.
- Died: April 30, 2012 (aged 81); Burbank, California, U.S.
- Occupation: Actor
- Years active: 1961–2012

George Murdock (born George Sawaya Jr.; June 25, 1930 – April 30, 2012) was an American character actor, whose career was mainly in television.

== Early years ==
Murdock was born in Salina, Kansas. He was the second child of seven children born to George R. Sawaya, a Lebanese immigrant, and Olive (née Johnson) Sawaya.

== Career ==
Murdock was an original cast member of the Los Angeles-based Melrose Theatre, appearing in “Lester Sims Retires Tomorrow” during its early 1980s off-Broadway run, while also appearing in productions staged at the South Coast Repertory as well as the Los Angeles Theater Center and the Odyssey Theatre.

Murdock was known for frequently playing judges, (for instance, Judge Julius Hoffman in West Coast and Chicago stage productions of The Chicago Conspiracy Trial and in an adaptation for BBC Radio), he also performed the role of "Big Daddy" in Tennessee Williams' Cat on a Hot Tin Roof with the Arizona Theater Company during the 1988 season. He was also Laszlo Gabo on the 1986–87 sitcom What a Country!. These appearances, along with roles that leveraged Murdock’s craggy facial features and deep bass voice, led a Los Angeles Times reporter to ask him in 1982 if he ever objected to being typecast, to which Murdoch responded, “Getting the job is important. Who cares where it comes from.”

Among his most well-known characters for movies and television were Lt. Scanlon, the bitter and suspicious NYPD Internal Affairs officer in Barney Miller, Dr. Salik in Battlestar Galactica TV series, "God" in Star Trek V: The Final Frontier, Admiral Hanson in the Star Trek: The Next Generation episode "The Best of Both Worlds", and as Yuri Testikov in the Seinfeld episode, "The Marine Biologist".

== Death ==
On April 30, 2012, Murdock died of cancer in Burbank, California, at age 81. He was survived by his wife, Cathy, and a stepdaughter.

== Filmography ==
- The Twilight Zone (Episode: "The Dummy") (1962, TV Series) as Willie
- The Untouchables (1962, TV Series) as Pete Topchinski / Gus Dmytryk
- Pressure Point (1962) as Rally Speaker (uncredited)
- 77 Sunset Strip (1963, TV Series) as Frank Syden
- He Rides Tall (1964) as Burt
- Taggart (1964) as Army Scout (uncredited)
- Combat! (1965, TV Series) as Marcus
- I Spy (1965, TV Series) as Mariner
- Bonanza (1965-1970, TV Series) as Luis Getty / Marks / Floyd
- Ben Casey (1965) as Byron B. Davis
- The F.B.I. (1965–1974, TV Series) as Dirken / Vic Kirby / Al Evans
- Tarzan (1966–1967, TV Series) as Eric / Damian / Karl
- Gunn (1967) as Archie
- Batman (1967) as one of Catwoman's henchmen
- The Wild Wild West (1967, TV Series) as Luther Coyle
- Gunsmoke (1967–1974, TV Series) as Luke / Cole Matson / Bret Gruber / Jim Travers
- Ironside (1968–1974, TV Series) as Sheriff / Phil Wagner / Jim Peters / Lee R. Anderson / FBI Agent Torrence / Capt. Walter Finch / Victor Cramer
- Blackbeard's Ghost (1968) as Head Official
- Cimarron Strip (1968, TV Series) as Bladgey
- The Virginian (1969, TV Series) as Barton
- Night Gallery (1969, TV Series) as 1st Agent
- It Takes a Thief (1970, TV series) as Devon
- Hawaii Five-O (1971, TV Series) as Hank Merrill
- The Mod Squad (1971, TV Series) as Price
- The Todd Killings (1971) as Police Officer
- Adam-12 (1971, TV Series) as Mr. Williams
- Bearcats! (1971, TV Series) as Coot Leonard
- Banacek (1972–1974, TV Series) as Cavanaugh
- McCloud (1972–1974, TV Series) as Sergeant Rosovitch / Officer Duncan
- The Mack (1973) as Fatman
- The New Perry Mason (1973, TV Series) as Sgt. Dave Cook
- The Magician (1973, TV Series) as Timothy Dunagan
- Willie Dynamite (1974) as Celli
- Thomasine & Bushrod (1974) as U.S. Marshal Bogardie
- The Six Million Dollar Man (1974, TV Series) as Rossi
- Hangup (1974) as Captain Gorney
- Earthquake (1974) as Colonel
- The Streets of San Francisco (1974–1977, TV Series) as Harlan Betts / Dempsey / Merle
- The Invisible Man (1975, TV Series) as Captain Scopes
- Police Woman (1975, TV Series) as Hogan / Macon
- Barney Miller (1976–1982, TV Series) as Lt. Ben Scanlon
- Little House on the Prairie (1977, TV Series) as Jeremy Stokes
- Breaker! Breaker! (1977) as Judge Joshua Trimmings
- Thunder and Lightning (1977) as Jake Summers
- Lou Grant (1977, TV Series) as Sgt. Irwin Winowsky
- The Rockford Files (1978, TV Series) as Doc Holliday
- Battlestar Galactica (1978–1979, TV Series) as the Doctor
- The Dukes of Hazzard (1979, TV Series) as Big Jim Downey
- The Misadventures of Sheriff Lobo (1979–1981, TV Series) as Mr. Sheldon / Mayor Hawkins
- Any Which Way You Can (1980) as Sgt. Cooley
- Trapper John, M.D. (1981, TV Series) as Jobo's Dad
- Shoot the Moon (1982) as French DeVoe
- Bosom Buddies (1982, TV Series) as Elliot Pardo
- T. J. Hooker (1982, TV Series) as Detective Jackson
- The Sword and the Sorcerer (1982) as Quade
- Hill Street Blues (1982, TV Series) as Buck Remington
- Benson (1982, TV Series) as Officer George Grimsby
- The Winds of War (1983) as Brig. Gen. 'Fitz' Fitzgerald
- I'm Going to Be Famous (1983)
- Knight Rider (1983–1984, TV Series) as Archibald / Judge Oliver Callan
- Night Court (1984, TV Series) as Detective Griffin / Sergeant Foster / Hank Mire / Womack
- Fame (1985, TV Series) as Mr. Pulaski
- Certain Fury (1985) as Lt. Speier
- Murder, She Wrote (1985, TV Series) as Officer Kaplan
- Small Wonder (1986, TV Series) as Mr. Gordon
- Retribution (1987) as Dr. John Talbot
- Dynasty (1988, TV Series) as Charlie Braddock
- Midnight Caller (1989, TV series) as Sam Chase
- War and Remembrance (1989, TV Mini-Series) as Gen. Leslie Groves
- Star Trek V: The Final Frontier (1989) as The "God" entity
- L.A. Law (1989, TV Series) as Sam
- Star Trek: The Next Generation (1990, TV Series) as Admiral J. P. Hanson
- Timescape (1992) as Judge Caldwell
- Final Analysis (1992) as Judge Costello
- Batman: The Animated Series (1992, TV Series) as Boss Biggis (voice)
- Law & Order (1992–1999, TV Series) as Judge Eric Bertram
- Lois & Clark: The New Adventures of Superman (1993, TV Series) as Burton Newcomb
- Firepower (1993) as Captain Croy
- Seinfeld (1994, TV Series) as Testikov
- Plughead Rewired: Circuitry Man II (1994) as Senator Riley
- Molly & Gina (1994) as Patrick Sweeny
- The Nanny (1995, TV Series) as Dakota Williams
- Tyson (1995, TV Movie) as Baranski
- The American President (1995) as Congressman
- Crosscut (1996) as Uncle Leo
- Chicago Hope (1996, TV Series) as Judge John Spencer
- ER (1996, TV Series) as Mr. Sidowski
- The Gregory Hines Show (1997, TV Series) as Samuel Lawrence
- Mike Hammer, Private Eye (1997, TV Series) as Cleve Baxter
- Scorpio One (1998) as CIA Director Wilfrid Parlow
- Early Edition (1998, TV Series) as Dutch Van Drie
- Anarchy TV (1998) as Chief Cochon
- Just Shoot Me! (1998, TV Series) as Sea Captain
- Phoenix (1998) as Sid
- The X-Files (1998–1999, TV Series) as Elder #2 / 2nd Elder
- The X-Files: Fight the Future (1998) as 2nd Elder
- The Adventures of Ragtime (1998) as Captain Murphy
- The Norm Show (1999, TV Series) as Probation Officer
- Family Tree (1999) as Big Wig
- Battlestar Galactica: The Second Coming (1999, Short) as Dr. Salik
- Time Share (2000) as Cedric Templeton
- Judging Amy (2000–2002, TV Series) as Judge Norman Artel
- 2000x (NPR/Hollywood Theater of the Ear radio series)
- Smallville (2001, TV Series) as Old Harry Bollston
- Orange County (2002) as Bob Beugler
- The Dead Zone (2002, TV Series) as Arthur Allen
- Legend of the Phantom Rider (2002) as The Judge
- Spider's Web (2002) as Robert Harding
- Looney Tunes: Back in Action (2003) as Acme VP, Unfairly Promoted
- Serial Killing 4 Dummys (2004) as Detective Ray Berro
- CSI: Crime Scene Investigation (2005, TV Series) as Stuart Manslow
- One More Round (2005) as Mr. Mack
- Man in the Chair (2007) as Richard Butler
- Say It in Russian (2007) as Warden
- Eagleheart (2011, TV Series) as Fred
- Torchwood: Miracle Day (2011, TV Series) as Preacher
- Dispatch (2011) as Himself
