= The Unborn 2 =

- Directed by: Rick Jacobson
- Written by: Rob Kerchner and Daniella Purcell
- Produced by: Roger Corman; Mike Elliot
- Starring: Michele Greene; Robin Curtis; Scott Valentine; Darryl Henriques; Carole Ita White; Brittney Powell; Leonard O. Turner; Anneliza Scott
- Music by: John R. Graham
- Release date: 1994
- Running time: 83 minutes
- Country: United States
- Language: English

The Unborn 2 is a 1994 American horror film directed by Rick Jacobson, and a sequel to the 1991 film The Unborn.

== Plot ==
A fertility experiment gone awry has created at least several disfigured children with extremely high IQs. A woman who had the treatment is making it her mission to kill the mutants one by one before they destroy mankind. One mutant child's mother is trying to save her own deformed child from the pursuer, but the baby leaves a path of destruction in its wake.

== Cast ==
- Michele Greene as Catherine Moore
- Robin Curtis as Linda Holt
- Scott Valentine as John Edson
- Darryl Henriques as Artie Philips
- Carole Ita White as Marge Philips
- Brittney Powell as Sally Anne Philips
- Michael McDonald as Welfare Worker
- Leonard O. Turner as Lieutenant Briggs
- Anneliza Scott as Officer Craig

== Development ==
The script for The Unborn 2 was written by Daniella Purcell, based on an earlier draft by Rob Kerchner. The role of director was initially offered to Rodman Flender and Brooke Adams, the director and star of the first film, respectively. The spot was eventually taken by Rick Jacobson due to his work with Mike Elliott and Roger Corman on Blackbelt, Full Contact, and Dragon Fire. Gabe Bartalos was brought on to create the mutated children.

== Release ==
The Unborn 2 was released on home video in July 1994. Per The Schlock Pit, there are unsubstantiated rumors that Roger Corman screened the film in "a Florida fleapit a fortnight prior to its stateside cassette bow."

== Reception ==
In 2011, author John Kenneth Muir wrote that, "This action-packed sequel to The Unborn has some real momentum going for it, but not a whole lot more", concluding, "One thing's for sure: The Unborn 2 isn't boring. Silly and dopey at times, yes, but certainly not boring." The Schlock Pit reviewed the film, noting that the film had diminishing returns but that "there’s a lot to like about this lively, Rick Jacobson-helmed sequel."
