= Death Ring =

- Directed by: R.J. Kizer
- Written by: George T. LeBrun; Mike Norris
- Starring: Mike Norris; Billy Drago; Chad McQueen; Elizabeth Sung; Don Swayze; Ron Thompson
- Release date: 1992
- Running time: 91 minutes
- Country: United States
- Language: English

Death Ring is a 1992 action film starring Mike Norris, Billy Drago, Chad McQueen, Elizabeth Sung, Don Swayze, Ron Thompson and directed by R.J. Kizer.

It had sold 20,000 copies by July 1993, enough to make a profit.

== Plot ==
Ex-Green Beret Matt Collins is kidnapped along with his fiancée, Lauren Sadler, by the crazed hunter extraordinaire Danton Vachs. Every year, Vachs holds a contest where people can purchase the right to hunt down and kill human beings. This time, Collins is to be the hunted while Vachs uses Lauren as motivation for him to really fight for his life, thus providing the buyers with an exceptionally entertaining hunt. As the hunt begins, Collins is set free on an uncharted island where four killers are set out to find and kill him.

== Cast ==
- Mike Norris as Matt Collins
- Billy Drago as Danton Vachs
- Chad McQueen as 'Skylord' Harris
- Don Swayze as John Blackwell
- Elizabeth Fong Sung as Ms. Ling
- Isabel Glasser as Lauren Sadler
- Branscombe Richmond as Mr. Cross
- Kelly Bennett as Merlin, At Talismania
- Víctor Quintero as 'Iceman'
- George Kee Cheung as Mr. Chen
- Henry Kingi as 'Apache'
- Donegan Smith as Mr. Temple
- Melanie Elam as Bambi, Female Guard #1
- Taryn Swallow as Thumper, Female Guard #2
- Dennis Lipscomb as Jessup
- Carl Ciarfalio as Pax, Bar Bully
- Joel Stoffer as Orin, Weasley Thug
- Ron Howard George as Crowley, Bigger Thug
- Vincent Lucchesi as Andy, Batting Cage
- Tammy Stones as Cindy Macklin
- Judy Peterson as 'Sparrow', Bar Waitress
- Francine Forbes as Joan Tomlin, Newscaster
- Ron Thompson as 'Needles', Tattooer
- Lana Shields as Lisa, Tattoo Parlor
- Leslie Jean De Beauvais as Diane, Tattoo Parlor
