= A Child Too Many =

- VHS case (Canadian/Australian version)
- Genre: Drama
- Written by: Jayne Martin
- Directed by: Jorge Montesi
- Starring: Michele Greene; Conor O'Farrell; Stephen Macht; Nancy Stafford; Kevin McNulty
- Music by: Bruce Babcock
- Country of origin: Canada
- Original language: English

Production
- Executive producer: Lawrence Horowitz
- Production locations: Vancouver, British Columbia, Canada
- Running time: 120 minutes
- Production companies: New World Television; O'Hara-Horowitz Productions

Original release
- Network: National Broadcasting Company (NBC) (United States)
- Release: 1993

A Child Too Many (marketed in the United States as Moment of Truth: A Child Too Many and A Child Too Many: The Patty Nowakowski Story, and in Quebec as Un enfant de trop) is a 1993 Canadian made-for-television drama film exploring the story of a family impacted by an ethical dilemma when they agree to get involved in surrogacy with a wealthy older couple. Allegedly based on true events, the film stars Michele Greene, Conor O'Farrell, Stephen Macht, Nancy Stafford and Kevin McNulty. It received mixed reviews from critics, and received a home video (VHS) release in Canada.

== Background ==
A Child Too Many is based on the real-life case of Patty Nowakowski, a Michigan housewife who had agreed to be a surrogate for a wealthy couple. The surrogacy was arranged under a $10,000 contract arranged by Noel Keane, a Dearborn attorney specializing in surrogate birth agreements. Keane had ties to the "Baby M" case, but claimed that he did not know of a couple ever having rejected a surrogate baby because of its sex. In Nowakowski's case, she was given fertility drugs and became pregnant at the first artificial insemination. Upon discovering that she was carrying twins, the couple adopting the surrogate babies (having one biological son already) rejected one of the twins, arguing that having two babies would add stress to their family. The Patty Nowakowski case is known for the lengthy lawsuit and debate that it sparked about the ethics of surrogacy, particularly paid surrogacy. The wealthy couple originally set to adopt the surrogate baby (pseudonymously surnamed "Davis" in A Child Too Many) were unnamed by public sources due to a settlement agreement that would protect their privacy.

== Plot ==
Patty and Aaron Nowakowski are a happily married couple with multiple children. Patty, wholly devoted to motherhood and pregnancy to the point of obsession, is researching surrogacy, something which bothers Aaron; he wonders if his wife will really be able to let go of the baby once it is born for another couple. Patty is also bothered by the idea of another man's semen being put in her body, but she signs up for surrogacy anyway, working with an agency that arranges a paid agreement with Sharon and Bill Davis, two wealthy socialites who want a baby. Sharon has already had a biological son, Adam, but needed a hysterectomy at a later point. Patty and Aaron ask about Sharon and Bill's stance on what type of baby they will accept, and are relieved to learn that the couple will gladly take in a mentally or physically disabled baby, calming their fears about the possibility of anything going wrong.

Patty is shocked and excited to learn that she's having twins, but Sharon and Bill reject the male twin, only wanting the female twin, with Bill shouting at the Nowakowskis, "if you're carrying a baby girl, she's legally ours and we want her!". This means that the male twin will be separated from his sister and end up either in foster care or alternative adoption. Patty is horrified and learns that there is almost no legislation in place regulating surrogacy or protecting the best interest of the babies, while the Nowakowski children are curious about the surrogacy process and disappointed to learn that the twins will be separated. Patty and Aaron decide to adopt the male twin themselves, naming him Arthur. Sharon Davis takes the female twin home, but she and her husband fear the public scrutiny if it ever comes out in the media that they gave Arthur away. Patty spots Sharon in a garden centre and berates her for refusing to accept Arthur, arguing that the wealth she has could easily pay for a nanny for both twins. Sharon argues back, "don't you pass judgment on me... I never sold one of my children!", leaving Patty extremely hurt. Bill Davis's attorney reluctantly agrees to help fight the Nowakowskis in court, but reveals to Bill that the media will then know all about it, raising the concern that Adam's schoolmates will hear about the case and bully him over his parents "giving away his little brother". A court settlement is reached that protects the privacy of the Davis family, but that also places the female twin baby under the full custody of the Nowakowskis. At an outdoor birthday party for the twins, Sharon arrives in her vehicle uninvited, longing to see the twins. Patty is angry, but reveals that when the twins are old enough to understand the truth of their birth, they can decide for themselves whether or not they want to meet Sharon, Bill and Adam. Sharon tearfully drives away, leaving Patty to reflect on the case.

== Cast ==
- Michele Greene as Patty Nowakowski
- Conor O'Farrell as Aaron Nowakowski
- Stephen Macht as Bill Davis
- Nancy Stafford as Sharon Davis
- Kevin McNutly as Daniel Hall
- Joel Palmer as Adam
- Malcolm Stewart as Lawyer
- Colleen Winton as Senator Binsfeld
- Andrew Wheeler as Doctor
- Michele Goodger as Mrs. Todd
- The Nowakowski children were played by Alex Doduk, Heather Beaty, Shannon Beaty (both playing Abby Nowakoski at different times throughout the film), Jeff Irvine and Sandra Nelson.

== Reception ==
A Child Too Many received mixed reviews from critics. Drew Voros of Variety stated, "surprisingly Moment of Truth: A Child Too Many is more than shock-talk fodder, it's family entertainment of a different sort with a script by Jayne Martin that becomes truly compelling." He also praised the acting of Nancy Stafford and Stephen Macht, who he said "make a chilly pair" as Sharon and Bill Davis. Susan Stewart, writing for the Detroit Free Press, felt that the drama sank "under too many tears", expressing criticism of the babies trained to cry when the adults were upset, rating it overall with two stars.

Tom Jicha of South Florida Sun-Sentinel was more critical of the film, calling it "a tear-jerker with redeeming merit since it challenges the audience to examine its feelings about an issue that is becoming more common in society" but also reacting negatively to the conflict of interest in the film's portrayal of its real-life story basis, noting, "the movie was made with the cooperation of the Nowakowskis. Payback is they are portrayed as saints. Meanwhile, Davis isn't even the real name of the other couple, who have a court order decreeing that their name not be made public."

== See also ==
- Baby M Case
