= Yuppie =

Short for "young urban professional"

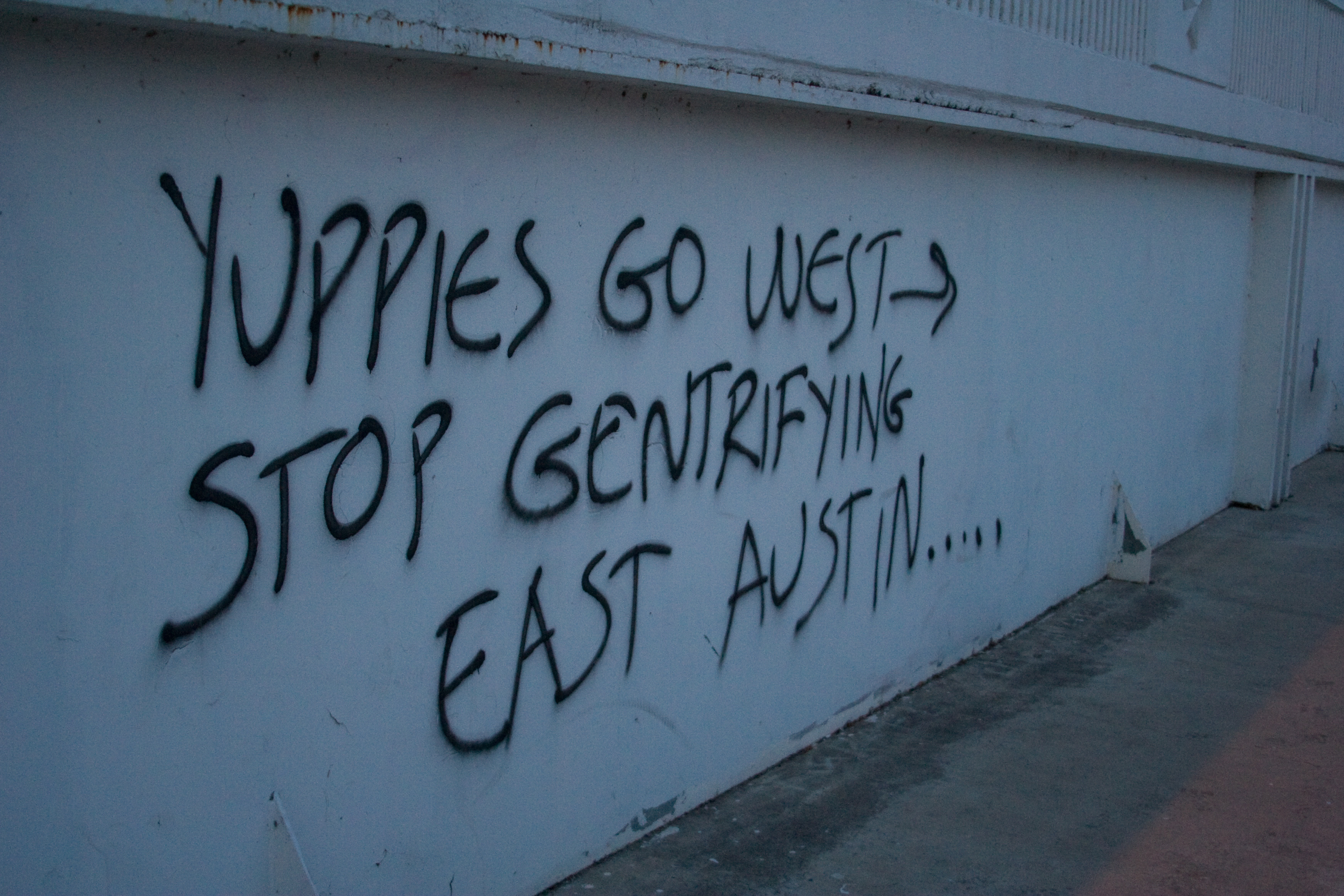
Anti-yuppie graffiti criticizing the gentrification of Austin, Texas

Yuppie, short for "young urban professional" or "young upwardly mobile professional", refers to a young professional working in a city. The term first appeared in print in 1980, when it was used as a fairly neutral demographic label; however, by the mid-to-late 1980s, a "yuppie backlash" developed due to issues including gentrification, and the term took on a pejorative meaning.

== Origin ==
Something is occurring in Chicago ... Some 20,000 new dwelling units have been built within two miles of the Loop over the past ten years to accommodate the rising tide of "Yuppies"—young urban professionals rebelling against the stodgy suburban lifestyles of their parents. The Yuppies seek neither comfort nor security, but stimulation, and they can find that only in the densest sections of the city.

— Dan Rottenberg (1980)

"Yuppie" first appeared in print Chicago magazine article by Dan Rottenberg in 1980. Rottenberg claimed he did not invent the term, and at the time, he understood it as a neutral demographic term. Nonetheless, his article describes the gentrification as a result of the influx of new affluent residents.

The term gained currency in the United States in 1983 when columnist Bob Greene published a story about a business networking group founded in 1982 by the former radical leader Jerry Rubin, formerly of the Youth International Party (whose members were called "yippies"); Greene said he had heard people at the networking group (which met at Studio 54 to soft classical music) joke that Rubin had "gone from being a yippie to being a yuppie". The headline of Greene's story was "From Yippie to Yuppie". East Bay Express humorist Alice Kahn elaborated on the concept in a satirical piece published in June 1983, further popularizing the term.

The word was further popularized with the publication of The Yuppie Handbook in January 1983 (a tongue-in-cheek take on The Official Preppy Handbook), followed by Senator Gary Hart's 1984 candidacy as a "yuppie candidate" for President of the United States. The term was then used to describe a political demographic group of socially liberal but fiscally conservative voters favoring his candidacy. Newsweek magazine declared 1984 "The Year of the Yuppie", characterizing the salary range, occupations, and politics of "yuppies" as "demographically hazy". The alternative acronym yumpie, for young upwardly mobile professional, was also concurrent in the 1980s but failed to catch on.

== Yuppie Backlash ==
In a 1985 issue of The Wall Street Journal, Theressa Kersten at SRI International described a "yuppie backlash" by people who fit the demographic profile yet express resentment of the label: "You're talking about a class of people who put off having families so they can make payments on the SAABs ... To be a Yuppie is to be a loathsome undesirable creature". Leo Shapiro, a market researcher in Chicago, responded, "Stereotyping always winds up being derogatory. It doesn't matter whether you are trying to advertise to farmers, Hispanics or Yuppies, no one likes to be neatly lumped into some group."

The word lost most of its political connotations and, particularly after the 1987 stock market crash, gained the negative socioeconomic connotations that it sports today. On April 8, 1991, Time magazine proclaimed the death of the "yuppie" in a mock obituary. In 1989, MTV hosted the Foreclosure on a Yuppie contest to celebrate the end of the 1980s.

The term experienced a resurgence in usage during the 2000s and 2010s. In October 2000, David Brooks remarked in a Weekly Standard article that Benjamin Franklin – due to his extreme wealth, cosmopolitanism, and adventurous social life – is "Our Founding Yuppie". A recent article in Details proclaimed "The Return of the Yuppie", stating that "the yuppie of 1986 and the yuppie of 2006 are so similar as to be indistinguishable" and that "the yup" is "a shape-shifter... he finds ways to reenter the American psyche." Despite the 2008 financial crisis, in 2010, political commentator Victor Davis Hanson wrote in National Review very critically of "yuppies". However, following the 2020 stock market crash and the ongoing COVID-19 recession, they are believed to be gone once more.

Following the inauguration of Donald Trump in 2025, UnHerd explored the rise of Yuppiefuturism, an ideology that fused Yuppie aesthetics with MAGA politics and Silicon Valley techno-utopianism. The Economist reported in August 2025 that yuppies were responsible for the population growth of the NoMa (north of Massachusetts Avenue) neighborhood in the District of Columbia by moving there and buying homes in large numbers. Their yes-in-my-backyard (YIMBY) attitude has made NoMa the fastest-growing in the country in terms of new housing construction.

== Usage outside the United States ==
"Yuppie" was in common use in Britain from the early 1980s onward (the premiership of Margaret Thatcher); by 1987, it had spawned subsidiary terms used in newspapers such as "yuppiedom", "yuppification", "yuppify" and "yuppie-bashing".

A September 2010 article in The Standard described the items on a typical Hong Kong resident's "yuppie wish list" based on a survey of 28- to 35-year-olds. About 58% wanted to own their own home, 40% wanted to professionally invest, and 28% wanted to become a boss. A September 2010 article in The New York Times defined as a hallmark of Russian "yuppie life" the adoption of yoga and other elements of Indian culture such as their clothes, food, and furniture.

== In popular culture ==
In the 1987 crime drama film Wall Street, Michael Douglas and Charlie Sheen both portray yuppies.

In the 1988 film Bright Lights, Big City, Michael J. Fox as Jamie plays a typical yuppie.

In 1990, rock artist Tom Petty used the term in the song "Yer So Bad", in the line "My sister got lucky, married a yuppie".

In the 2000 American horror film American Psycho, the protagonist, Patrick Bateman, along with his work colleagues are all portrayed as yuppies.

In the 2013 Martin Scorsese film The Wolf of Wall Street, Leonardo DiCaprio plays the role of a yuppie.

== See also ==
- Baby boomers (demographic cohort)
- Bobo (socio-economic group) - French, bourgeois-bohemian
- Creative class (proposed socio-economic group)
- DINK (socio-economic group - Dual Income No Kids)
- Hipster (socio-economic group)
- Knowledge worker
- Professional-managerial class
- Salaryman, a comparable Japanese stereotype
- Social mobility
- Upper-middle class
- Urbanization
- White-collar worker
- Sloane Ranger, a word frequently used with Yuppie to describe the affluent in London in the '70s/'80s.
