= Michele Greene =

American actress

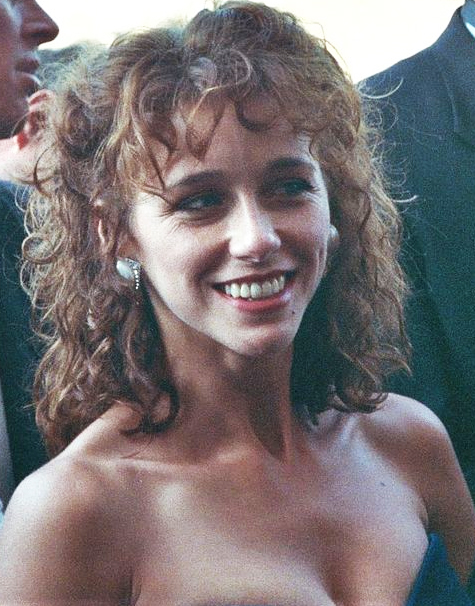
- Greene at the 1990 Emmy Awards
- Born: Michele Dominguez Greene; February 3, 1962 (age 64); Las Vegas, Nevada, U.S.
- Education: Fairfax High School
- Alma mater: University of Southern California (BFA)
- Occupations: Actress; singer; songwriter; author
- Years active: 1979–present
- Known for: L.A. Law; Perry Mason: The Case of the Notorious Nun; Diagnosis Murder; Nightmare on the 13th Floor; Matlock
- Spouse: Brahms Yaiche (m. 1997–1998)

Michele Dominguez Greene (born February 3, 1962) is an American actress, singer, and author. She is known for her role as attorney Abby Perkins on the TV series L.A. Law from 1986 to 1991, for which she was nominated for a 1989 Primetime Emmy Award. She reprised the role in the 2002 TV reunion film L.A. Law: The Movie.

== Early years ==
Greene was born in Las Vegas, Nevada, to an Irish-American father, Roland, and a Mexican/Nicaraguan mother, Dorita, who was a singer and dancer. Greene was raised in Los Angeles, California. She attended Fairfax High School in Los Angeles where she first began acting after enrolling in drama class; she had chosen the class to help her overcome her extreme shyness.

She attended the University of Southern California, where she auditioned for and was accepted to the Bachelor of Fine Arts program, entering on a scholarship and beginning her formal training as an actor.

== Career ==
During her college years, Greene began working in television, appearing in guest shots and television movies. Shortly after graduation, she landed the role of Judy Nuckles in the short-lived Steven Bochco series Bay City Blues (1983). When that was cancelled, Bochco kept her in mind and offered her the role of Abby Perkins on L.A. Law in 1986. The show was a critical and commercial success, winning multiple Emmys and garnering Greene a nomination in the Best Supporting Actress category in 1989. Together with Amanda Donohoe, her character participated in what was American primetime television's first lesbian kiss in 1991. Greene appeared on L.A. Law for five seasons, leaving in 1991 to pursue her musical career and pursue other acting challenges.

After leaving L.A. Law, Greene had acting roles in a number of television series including Bones, CSI, CSI: Miami, Cold Case, Crossing Jordan, Diagnosis: Murder, JAG, Judging Amy, Nip/Tuck, The Outer Limits, Six Feet Under, Stargate SG-1 and The Unit. Greene also appeared in an episode of Brothers & Sisters on ABC-TV in March 2009 as a fictional Governor of California. She had a recurring role on HBO's Big Love as a TV reporter.

Greene has recorded two bilingual CDs, Ojo de Tiburon and Luna Roja. She has also written two young adult novels, Chasing the Jaguar: A Martika Gálvez Mystery and Keep Sweet.

== Filmography ==
=== Film ===
| Year | Title | Role | Notes |
|---|---|---|---|
| 1981 | The Dark End of the Street | Marlene | |
| 1988 | Going to the Chapel | Margo | |
| 1990 | Nightmare on the 13th Floor | Elaine Kalisher | |
| 1994 | The Unborn II | Catherine Moore | |
| 1994 | Stranger by Night | Lisa | Direct-to-video (as Michelle Green) |
| 1996 | Daddy's Girl | Barbara Mitchell | Direct-to-video |
| 1997 | Her Married Lover | Brenda Slagel | |
| 1997 | Stranger in the House | Joanna Winters | |
| 1999 | Fugitive Mind | Robyn | Direct-to-video |
| 2000 | Alcatraz Avenue | Lisa | |
| 2001 | A Family Affair | Reggie Abravanel | |
| 2002 | Determination of Death | Katie Williams | |
| 2003 | A Woman Hunted | Gloria Parker | |
| 2005 | The Legend of Lucy Keyes | Sheila Travers | |
| 2023 | The Kill Floor | Janet Pruitt | Short film]] |

=== Television ===
| Year | Title | Role | Notes |
|---|---|---|---|
| 1979 | Dorothy | Margo | 2 episodes |
| 1979 | Laverne & Shirley | Vicki | Episode: "Bad Girls" |
| 1980–1981 | Eight is Enough | Jill | 5 episodes |
| 1981 | The Miracle of Kathy Miller | Sherrie | Movie |
| 1982 | Desperate Lives | Julie Jordan | Movie |
| 1982 | The Dukes of Hazzard | Bobby Lee Jordan | Episode: "Coy Meets Girl" (5.4) |
| 1983 | For Love and Honor | Joy | Episode: "For Love and Honor" (pilot) (1.1) |
| 1983 | ABC Afterschool Specials | Andrea Cranston | Episode: "Andrea's Story: A Hitchhiking Tragedy" (12.4) |
| 1983 | Bay City Blues | Judy Nuckles | 8 episodes |
| 1984 | Highway to Heaven | Sara Higgins | Episode: "Song of the Wild West" (1.5) |
| 1985 | Simon & Simon | Lisa Brơoks | Episode: "Mummy Talks" (4.20) |
| 1985 | Seduced | Thunder Thighs | Movie |
| 1985 | The Best Times | Stacey Emery | Episode: " The Narc" (1.3) |
| 1986 | American Playhouse | Kevin's Friend (as Michelle Greene) | Episode: "The Little Sister" (5.9) |
| 1986 | Perry Mason: The Case of the Notorious Nun | Sister Margaret | Movie |
| 1986–1991 | L.A. Law | Abby Perkins | Seasons 1–5 |
| 1987 | Matlock | Laura Gordon | Episode: "The Billionaire" Parts 1 & 2 (2.1) (2.2) |
| 1988 | Double Standard | Virginia | Movie |
| 1989 | The Pat Sajak Show | Herself | Episode: (1.6) |
| 1990 | In the Best Interest of the Child | Nora | Movie |
| 1990 | Nightmare on the 13th Floor | Elaine Kalisher | Movie |
| 1990 | Cop Rock | Abby Perkins | Episode: "Potts Don't Fail Me Now" (1.8) (uncredited) |
| 1990 | To My Daughter | Julie Carlston | Movie |
| 1991 | Posing: Inspired by Three Real Stories originally known as I Posed for Playboy | Janet Janeway | Movie |
| 1992 | Jack's Place | Suzanne | Episode: "Everything Old Is New Again" (1.4) |
| 1993 | Silent Victim | Bonnie Jackson | Movie |
| 1993 | Moment of Truth: A Child Too Many | Patty Nowakowski | Movie |
| 1993 | Picket Fences | Patty Henley | Episode: "Duty Free Rome" (2.2) |
| 1994 | Heart of a Child | Karen Schouten | Movie |
| 1994 | How the West Was Fun | Laura Forester | Movie |
| 1996 | She Woke Up Pregnant | Connie Loftis | Movie |
| 1997 | Badge of Betrayal | Annie Walker | Movie |
| 1997 | The Outer Limits | Joan Garrison | Episode: "The Awakening" (3.10) |
| 1997 | Lost Treasure of Dos Santos | Willa | Movie |
| 1997; 2001 | Diagnosis Murder | Rachel Wơdrall; Carrie Langford Adams | "Must Kill TV" (5.9) "Sins of the Father" Parts 1 & 2 (8.12, 13) |
| 1998 | Captive | Lily Hunter | Movie |
| 1999 | Twice in a Lifetime | Jenny Parnell / Dr. Karen Lantz | Episode: "The Gift of Life" (1.14) |
| 2000 | Stargate SG-1 | Laira | Episode: "A Hundred Days" (3.17) |
| 2000 | Entertainment Tonight Presents: L.A. Law – Secrets of the Firm | Herself | Special |
| 2000 | Wild Grizzly | Rachel Harding | Movie |
| 2001 | The Perfect Wife | Felicia Laurel | Movie |
| 2001 | Lightning: Fire from the Sky | Barbara Dobbs | Movie |
| 2002 | Redeemer | Sharon Davidson | Movie |
| 2002 | JAG | Lt. Col. Sara Coffey | Episode: "Head to Toe" (7.15) |
| 2002 | NBC 75th Anniversary Special | Herself | |
| 2002 | Weakest Link | Herself | "L.A. Law Edition" (game) |
| 2002 | L.A. Law: The Movie | Abby Perkins | Reunion |
| 2002 | CSI: Crime Scene Investigation | Jan Branson | Episode: " Blood Lust" (3.9) |
| 2002 | TV's Most Censored Moments | Herself | Special |
| 2003 | Miracles | Travis's Aunt | Episode: "The Bone Scatterer" (1.5) |
| 2003 | Killer Flood: The Day the Dam Broke | Natalie Powell | Movie |
| 2003 | Strong Medicine | Pam Sherr | Episode: "Rash Decisions" (4.4) |
| 2004 | Judging Amy | Beth Benfield | Episode: "Christenings" (5.11) |
| 2004 | Crossing Jordan | Pam Oakley | Episode: "Missing Pieces" (3.7) |
| 2004 | Threat Matrix | Anne Colt | Episode: "19 Seconds" (1.15) |
| 2005 | Six Feet Under | Dr. Fraker | Episode: "Ecotone" (5.9) |
| 2005 | Nip/Tuck | Illana Manning | Episode: "Hannah Tedesco" (3.9) |
| 2006 | The Unit | Cynthia Burdett | 4 episodes |
| 2007 | McBride: Dogged | Judy Murray | Movie |
| 2007 | Cold Case | Tessie Bartram '07 | Episode: "Justice" (5.10) |
| 2008 | Bones | Amanda O'Rourke | Episode: "The Man in the Outhouse" (4.2) |
| 2009 | Brothers & Sisters | Governor Eve Kern | Episode: "Troubled Waters" Part 1 (3.16) |
| 2009 | CSI: Crime Scene Investigation | Sue Schiff | Episode: "The Gone Dead Train" (9.22) |
| 2009 | Brothers & Sisters | Governor Eve Kern | Episode: "Breaking the News" (4.2) |
| 2009 | Three Rivers | Judge Glynn | Episode: "A Roll of the Dice" (1.10) (as Michelle Greene) |
| 2010 | Big Love | Reporter Sheila Jackson White | 3 episodes |
| 2011 | The Defenders | Judge Glynn | Episode: "Nevada v. Donnie the Numbers Guy" (1.13) |
| 2011 | CSI: Miami | Connie Faber | Episode: "A Few Dead Men" (10.9) |
| 2021 | Viral Vignettes | Andrea | Episode: "Pass the Matzoh" (1.11) |

== Writing credits ==
| Year | Production | Notes |
|---|---|---|
| 2003 | Fly Cherry | Genre:Short film Drama; Writer; Filmed in Los Angeles, California, USA |

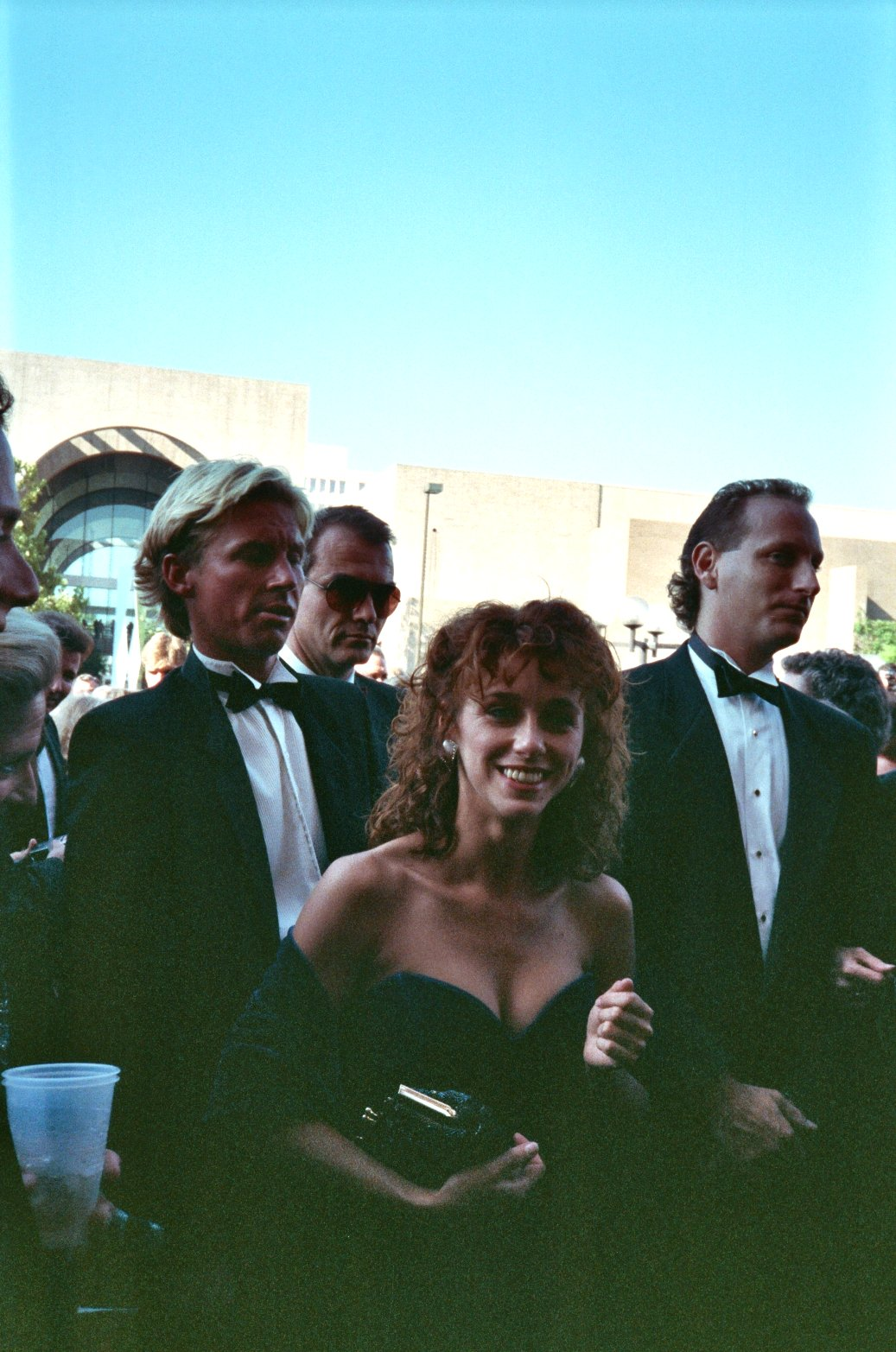
Michele Greene

== Discography ==
| Year | Album title | Label | Notes |
|---|---|---|---|
| 2002 | Ojo De Tiburon | Appleseed Recordings | |
| 2003 | Seeds: The Songs of Pete Seeger, Vol.3 | Appleseed Recordings | The song "From Way Up Here" |
| 2003 | Spanish In My Heart: Songs of the Spanish Civil War | Appleseed Recordings | The songs, "En la Plaza de Mi Pueblo" and "Tu Que Brillas" |
| 2006 | Luna Roja | Appleseed Recordings | |

== Literature ==
| Year | Book | Publisher | Category | Notes |
|---|---|---|---|---|
| 2006 | Chasing the Jaguar | Rayo HarperCollins | Fiction | Hardcover / Paperback |
| 2010 | Keep Sweet | Simon & Schuster | Fiction | Paperback |

== Awards and nominations ==
Awards
| Year | Award | Category | Production | Result |
|---|---|---|---|---|
| 1989 | Emmy Awards | Outstanding Supporting Actress in a Drama Series | L.A. Law | Nominated |
