= Nightmare on the 13th Floor =

1990 television film directed by Walter Grauman

- Genre: Horror; Thriller; Mystery
- Written by: J.D. Feigelson; Dan DiStefano
- Directed by: Walter Grauman
- Starring: Michele Greene; James Brolin; Louise Fletcher; Alan Fudge; John Karlen; Terri Treas
- Music by: Jay Gruska
- Country of origin: United States
- Original language: English

Production
- Executive producer: Walter Grauman
- Cinematography: Tom Richmond
- Editor: Sidney Katz
- Running time: 90 minutes
- Production companies: G.C. Group; Paramount Television; Wilshire Court Productions

Original release
- Network: USA Network
- Release: October 31, 1990

Nightmare on the 13th Floor is a 1990 American made-for-television thriller film which was originally shown on the USA Network on Halloween 1990. It stars Michele Greene as the travel writer Elaine Kalisher, James Brolin as Dr. Alan Lanier, Louise Fletcher as Letti Gordon, and Terri Treas as the concierge.

== Plot ==
The Wessex Hotel in Los Angeles is a Victorian hotel, built in 1898 at a height of 16 floors, including a 13th floor. Early in its history, serial killer Avery Block brought his friends to the 13th floor of the Wessex where he proceeded to kill them with a fire ax hoping to achieve immortality by the taking of others' lives. Due to the murders, the 13th floor was sealed off in October 1901 and a frieze was erected around the building covering the floor. Ninety years later, Traveler's Review magazine sends Elaine Kalisher to write a travel article.

== Cast ==
- Michele Greene - Elaine Kalisher
- James Brolin - Dr. Alan Lanier
- Louise Fletcher - Letti Gordon
- John Karlen - Sargent Madden
- Alan Fudge - Jake Rogas (hotel manager)
- Terri Treas - Judith Teller (concierge)
