= In the Best Interest of the Child =

- Genre: Drama
- Written by: Hal Sitowitz
- Directed by: David Greene
- Starring: Meg Tilly; Ed Begley Jr. Michael O'Keefe; Michele Greene; Angela Bassett
- Music by: Peter Manning Robinson
- Country of origin: United States
- Original language: English

Production
- Producers: James G. Hirsch; Robert Papazian
- Production location: Los Angeles
- Cinematography: Brianne Murphy
- Editor: Eric Sears
- Running time: 100 minutes
- Production company: Robert Papazian Productions

Original release
- Network: CBS
- Release: May 20, 1990

In the Best Interest of the Child is a 1990 American made-for-television drama film about child sexual abuse starring Meg Tilly, Ed Begley Jr., Michael O'Keefe and Michele Greene, directed by David Greene. It was originally broadcast on CBS on Sunday, May 20th, 1990.

== Plot ==
Jennifer Colton is a divorced mother and architect who retains custody of her five-year-old daughter Mandy while her ex-husband Walt is granted regular access for visitations. However, Jennifer becomes concerned by her daughter's restless sleeping and increasingly violent behaviors and is horrified to discover that Walt might be sexually abusing her. With the help of her cousin, attorney Howard Feldon, next-door neighbor and best friend Nora, as well as various doctors and therapists, Jennifer seeks to protect her daughter from Walt by having his access suspended.

Jennifer soon discovers that the law is not on her side when the court, in the absence of incontrovertible evidence, refuses to restrict Walt's unsupervised visitation rights. When Jennifer refuses to let Walt see Mandy, the judge finds her in contempt and places her in a county jail until she relents. Ultimately, Jennifer decides the only way to save Mandy from abuse is to "kidnap" Mandy. She is willing to go to prison so that Mandy can live in hiding with her relatives and away from her abusive father.

== Cast ==
- Meg Tilly as Jennifer Colton
- Ed Begley Jr. as Howard Feldon
- Michael O'Keefe as Walt Colton
- Michele Greene as Nora
- Marta Woodward as Mandy Colton
- David Wohl as Judge Warren Dunham
- James Eckhouse as Kevin Chilton
- Jim Byrnes as Kurt
- Angela Bassett as Lori
- Peter Hansen as Dr. Innes

== Award nomination ==
Year	Award	Category	Nominee	Result
1991	Young Artist Award	Best Young Actress Starring in a TV Movie, Pilot, or Special	Marta Woodward	Nominated
