= Chad McQueen =

American actor and race car driver (1960–2024)

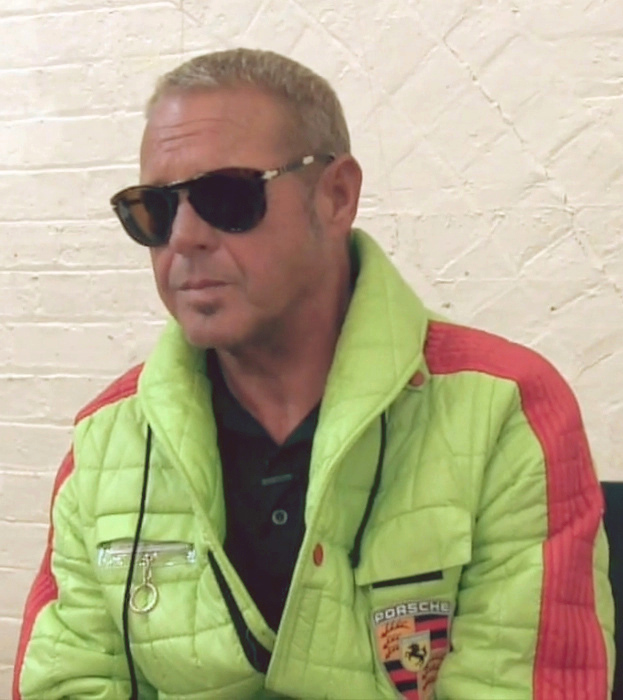
- McQueen in 2016
- Born: Chadwick Steven McQueen; December 28, 1960; Los Angeles, California, U.S.
- Died: September 11, 2024 (aged 63); Palm Desert, California, U.S.
- Occupations: Actor; producer; race car driver
- Years active: 1978–2001 (acting)
- Spouse: Stacey Rae Toten (m. 1987; div. 1990) Jeanie Galbraith (m. 1993)
- Children: 3, including Steven
- Parents: Steve McQueen; Neile Adams

Chadwick Steven McQueen (December 28, 1960 – September 11, 2024) was an American actor, film producer, martial artist, and race car driver. He was the only son and last living child of actor Steve McQueen (1930–1980).

== Early life ==
Chadwick Steven McQueen was born on December 28, 1960, in Los Angeles to actors Steve McQueen and Neile Adams. From an early age, McQueen was an enthusiast of automobiles, motorcycles, and racing, interests that he inherited from his father. He began racing dirt bikes by age 9 and, in three years, went on to win his class in the World Mini Grand Prix. He moved on to auto racing, winning his first race: the Mini Le Mans event, a children-only track created on the set of the 1971 film Le Mans, when McQueen was 10 years old. Before filming was completed on that film, McQueen enjoyed racing at triple-digit speeds down the straights while seated in his father's lap at the wheel of a Porsche 917. At 12, he won his class at the World Mini Grand Prix.

== Acting career ==
McQueen began his career as a film actor, playing the character Dutch in The Karate Kid and The Karate Kid Part II. His further acting work included main roles in direct-to-video action films including Martial Law, Death Ring, and Red Line. He also worked as a producer, winning a Telly Award for his documentary Filming at Speed. After his retirement from acting, McQueen appeared as himself on various television programs related to motorsports, including Hot Rod TV and Celebrity Rides.

Attempts were made to arrange for him to reprise his role as Dutch in the series Cobra Kai, but commitments to his company, McQueen Racing, and problems with his racing injuries, prevented this. He was unable to appear in the sixth season due to scheduling conflicts.

== Racing career ==
McQueen's professional racing career started in the Sports Car Club of America (SCCA). McQueen competed in several types of racing from Motocross to the Baja 1000. He teamed with Belgian racing legend Jacky Ickx and his daughter Vanina, piloting a trio of Porsche 959s restored by Porsche Motorsports for the 2004 Goodwood event. Also in 2004, he qualified for the SCCA Runoffs, winning multiple events. Racing for Westernesse Racing, he finished fourth.

In January 2006, McQueen was seriously injured (suffering a broken lower left leg, two fractures to his vertebrae, and multiple rib fractures) in an accident at the Daytona International Speedway while practicing for the 24 Hours of Daytona Sports Car race. He returned to Daytona during the 2007 Rolex 24 Hours of Daytona race to thank the medics and track workers who he said saved his life. McQueen subsequently stated that his driving days were over and he wanted to become a team owner.

In November 2007, McQueen returned to the Daytona International Speedway and got behind the wheel of the Brumos 1975 Ecurie Escargot RSR, driving it in the exhibitions at the Porsche Rennsport Reunion III.

In January 2010, McQueen started McQueen Racing, LLC, a company that partners with leaders in the motorcycle and custom-car industries towards development of high-performance, limited-edition custom cars, motorcycles, and accessories. The company is run by his children Chase and Madison.

== Personal life ==
Chad McQueen dated Jill Henderson White Pasceri in the 1980s, a USEF Equestrian rider and horse trainer. Jill is the daughter of trombonist Jimmy Henderson. He was married to Stacia Toten (who later wed Hockey Hall of Famer Luc Robitaille) from 1987 to 1990. The couple had a son, Steven R. McQueen (b. 1988), an actor, who was a regular in the television series The Vampire Diaries and Chicago Fire. McQueen married Jeanie Galbraith in 1993, with whom he had two children, son Chase and daughter Madison, both of whom run McQueen Racing.

His sister, Terry, was the owner of a Malibu film production company. She died in 1998 of respiratory complications after a liver transplant, at the age of 38.

=== Death ===
McQueen died from organ failure at his ranch in Palm Desert, California on September 11, 2024, at the age of 63. According to a friend, Arthur Barens, McQueen had never fully recovered from an injury he sustained in a fall in 2020. The Cobra Kai episode "Benvinguts a Barcelona" was dedicated to his memory.

== Filmography ==
Year	Title	Role	Notes
1978	Skateboard	Competition Skateboarder #21	
1983	Hadley's Rebellion	Rick Stanton	
1984	The Karate Kid	Dutch	
1984	V	Dean Boddicker	Episode: "Visitors Choice"
1985	Fever Pitch	Prisoner	
1985	The Fascination	A photographer	
1986	The Karate Kid Part II	Dutch	
1987	Nightforce	Henry	
1989	Jesse Hawkes	Unknown	Episode: "The Centurians"
1991	Martial Law	Sean Thompson	
1992	Death Ring	"Skylord" Harris	
1992	Where the Red Fern Grows: Part Two	Rainie Pritchard	
1993	New York Cop	Hawk	
1993	Firepower	Darren Braniff	
1994	Sexual Malice	David	
1994	Jimmy Hollywood	Audition Partner	
1994	Indecent Behavior II	Darrell Martine	
1994	Bullet II	Bullet	
1994	Search and Rescue	Dean	Television movie
1994	Possessed by the Night	Gus	Direct-to-video
1995	Number One Fan	Zane Barry	
1996	Red Line	Jim	
1996	Squanderers	John	
1998	Papertrail	William Frost	Also executive producer
1998	Surface to Air	Lt. Dylan "Raven" Massin	
2001	The Fall	Manny Carlotti	Final acting role
