= Warwick Davis filmography =

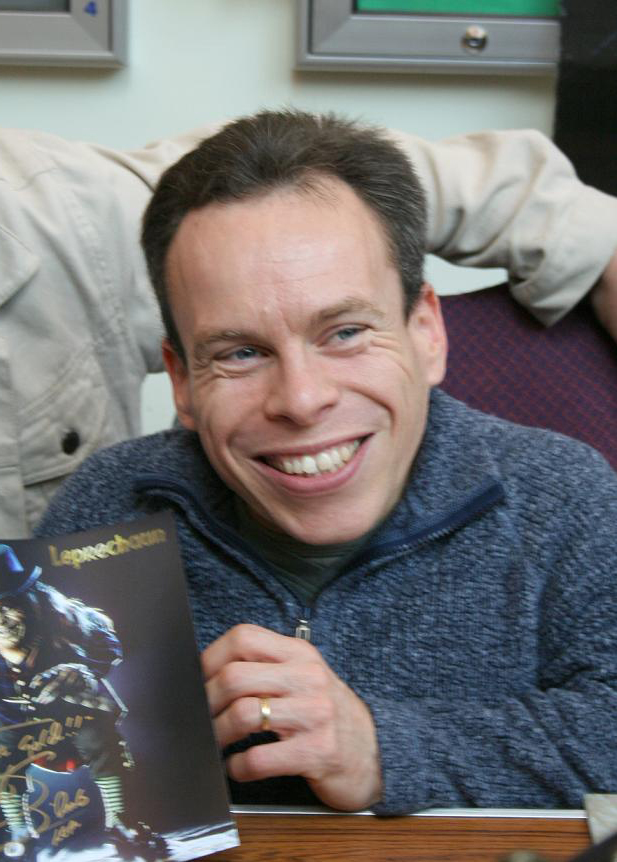
Davis in 2006

Warwick Davis (born 3 February 1970) is an English actor. He made his acting debut as Wicket W. Warrick in the Star Wars film Return of the Jedi (1983). He reprised the role in two television spin-offs: Caravan of Courage: An Ewok Adventure (1984) and Ewoks: The Battle for Endor (1985). He has since appeared in several Star Wars films, portraying numerous different characters, usually in cameos. He appeared in the cult-classic Labyrinth (1986). He then played the protagonist in the Ron Howard-directed Willow (1988). In 1993, he portrayed the villainous Lubdan in Leprechaun. He returned to the role in Leprechaun 2 (1994), Leprechaun 3 (1995), Leprechaun 4: In Space (1996), Leprechaun in the Hood (2000), and Leprechaun: Back 2 tha Hood (2003).

In 2005, he played Marvin the Paranoid Android in The Hitchhiker's Guide to the Galaxy.

Key
| † | Denotes projects that have not yet been released |

== Film ==
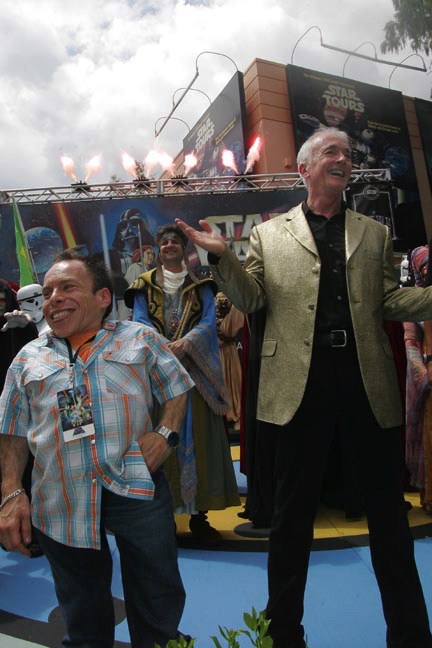
Davis with Anthony Daniels in 2007

| Year | Title | Role | Notes | Ref. |
|---|---|---|---|---|
| 1982 | Return of the Ewok | Himself / Wicket W. Warrick | Unreleased | |
| 1983 | Return of the Jedi | Wicket W. Warrick | | |
| 1984 | Caravan of Courage: An Ewok Adventure | Wicket W. Warrick | Voiced by Darryl Henriques | |
| 1985 | Ewoks: The Battle for Endor | Wicket W. Warrick | Voiced by Darryl Henriques | |
| 1986 | Labyrinth | Goblin Corps member | | |
| 1986 | The Princess and the Dwarf | | | |
| 1988 | Willow | Willow Ufgood | | |
| 1993 | Leprechaun | Lubdan | | |
| 1994 | Leprechaun 2 | Lubdan | | |
| 1995 | Leprechaun 3 | Lubdan | | |
| 1996 | Leprechaun 4: In Space | Lubdan | | |
| 1997 | Prince Valiant | Pechet | | |
| 1998 | A Very Unlucky Leprechaun | Lucky | | |
| 1999 | Star Wars: Episode I – The Phantom Menace | Yoda (walk-in shots) / Weazel / Wald | | |
| 1999 | The New Adventures of Pinocchio | Dwarf / Pepe the Cricket | | |
| 1999 | The White Pony | Lucky | | |
| 2000 | The 10th Kingdom | Acorn the Dwarf | | |
| 2000 | Leprechaun in the Hood | Lubdan | | |
| 2001 | Snow White: The Fairest of Them All | Saturday | | |
| 2001 | Harry Potter and the Philosopher's Stone | Professor Filius Flitwick / Goblin Bank Teller / Griphook (voice) | | |
| 2002 | Harry Potter and the Chamber of Secrets | Professor Filius Flitwick | | |
| 2002 | Al's Lads | Leo | | |
| 2003 | Leprechaun: Back 2 tha Hood | Lubdan | | |
| 2004 | Ray | Oberon | | |
| 2004 | Harry Potter and the Prisoner of Azkaban | Choir Master | Choir Master appearance later reused for the rest of the series as a design for Professor Filius Flitwick- A separate character to Choir Master | |
| 2004 | Skinned Deep | Plates | | |
| 2005 | The Hitchhiker's Guide to the Galaxy | Marvin the Paranoid Android | Voiced by Alan Rickman | |
| 2005 | Harry Potter and the Goblet of Fire | Professor Filius Flitwick | | |
| 2005 | Small Town Folk | Knackerman | | |
| 2007 | Harry Potter and the Order of the Phoenix | Professor Filius Flitwick | | |
| 2008 | Agent One-Half | Agent One-Half | | |
| 2008 | The Chronicles of Narnia: Prince Caspian | Nikabrik | | |
| 2009 | Harry Potter and the Half-Blood Prince | Professor Filius Flitwick | | |
| 2009 | Tell Him Next Year | Santa's Elf | Short film | |
| 2010 | Harry Potter and the Deathly Hallows – Part 1 | Griphook | | |
| 2011 | Dick and Dom's Funny Business | Himself | | |
| 2011 | Harry Potter and the Deathly Hallows – Part 2 | Griphook / Professor Filius Flitwick | | |
| 2012 | Chingari | Gangster Boss | As featured on An Idiot Abroad 3 | |
| 2012 | An Idiot Abroad | Himself | Series 3 | |
| 2013 | Jack the Giant Slayer | Old Hamm | | |
| 2013 | Ashens and the Quest for the GameChild | Himself / The Silver Skull Unmasked | Independent film | |
| 2013 | Dwarves Assemble | Oberon the Ufgood | All episodes | |
| 2013 | The Seven Dwarfs of Auschwitz | Himself / Presenter | Documentary | |
| 2013 | Saint Bernard | Othello | | |
| 2014–2015 | Weekend Escapes with Warwick Davis | Presenter | 2 series | |
| 2014–2015 | Celebrity Squares | Presenter | 2 series | |
| 2014 | Get Santa | Sally | | |
| 2014 | Text Santa | Father Christmas | | |
| 2015 | Piers Morgan's Life Stories | Himself | | |
| 2015 | Star Wars: The Force Awakens | Wollivan | | |
| 2016 | Rogue One: A Star Wars Story | Weeteef Cyubee | | |
| 2017 | Star Wars: The Last Jedi | Wodibin / Kedpin Shoklop (deleted scene) | | |
| 2017 | British Airways Safety Video | Himself | Pre-flight safety video | |
| 2018 | Solo: A Star Wars Story | Weazel / DD-BD / W1-EG5 / WG-22 | | |
| 2019 | Maleficent: Mistress of Evil | Lickspittle | | |
| 2019 | Horrible Histories – The Movie | Gladiator Trainer | | |
| 2019 | Star Wars: The Rise of Skywalker | Wicket W. Warrick / Wizzich Mozzer | | |

== Television ==
| Year | Title | Role | Notes | Ref. |
|---|---|---|---|---|
| 1989 | Prince Caspian/The Voyage of the Dawn Treader | Reepicheep | | |
| 1990 | The Silver Chair | Glimfeather | | |
| 1991 | Zorro | Don Alf onso | Episode: "The Jewelled Sword" | |
| 1996 | Gulliver's Travels | Grildrig | | |
| 1997 | The Fast Show | Dwarf | Series 3 Episode 8 | |
| 2005 | Extras | Himself | | |
| 2009 | M.I. High | Per Trollberger | Season 3 Episode 11: "The Visit" | |
| 2010 | Merlin | Grettir | Episode: "The Eye of the Phoenix" | |
| 2011 | Life's Too Short | Himself | Creator | |
| 2013 | Doctor Who | Porrige/Ludens Nimrod Kendrick Cord Longstaff XLI | Episode: "Nightmare In Silver" | |
| 2013 | Bookaboo | Episode: "Dustbin Dad" | | |
| 2014 | Catchphrase | Contestant | Celebrity Series 3, Episode 1 | |
| 2015 | The One Show | Guest presenter | Stand-in presenter | |
| 2015 | Catherine Tate's Nan | Graham Fanee | Episode: "Nanger Management" | |
| 2015 | Realms of Fightinge | Teuthis | Web series | |
| 2015–2016 | Planet's Got Talent | Narrator | 2 series | |
| 2016 | Billionaire Boy | Himself | Television film | |
| 2016 | The Dumping Ground | Lou | 2 episodes | |
| 2016 | The Entire Universe | The Big Bang | Television special | |
| 2016 | Fantastic Beasts and JK Rowling's Wizarding World | Presenter | Television special | |
| 2016 | Jonathan Creek | Rev. Wendell Wilkie | Episode: "Daemons' Roost" | |
| 2016–2024 | Tenable | Presenter | ITV game show | |
| 2017–present | Comic Relief | Co-presenter | 2017 telethon | |
| 2017 | Who Do You Think You Are? | Himself | 1 episode | |
| 2017–2018 | Star Wars Rebels | Rukh (voice) | 6 episodes | |
| 2019–2024 | Moominvalley | Sniff (voice) | 26 episodes | |
| 2020 | JJ Villard's Fairy Tales | Rumpelstiltskin (voice) | Episode: "Rumpelstiltskin" | |
| 2022 | Willow | Willow Ufgood | Lead role | |
| 2024 | Tales of the Empire | Rukh | Episode: The Path of Anger | |
| 2026 | Harry Potter † | Professor Flitwick | Currently in production | |
| TBA | Valeria 3D † | Leonardo | Pre-production; Television movie | |
