= L.A. Law: The Movie =

2002 television film directed by Michael Schultz

- Also known as: L.A. Law: Return to Justice
- Genre: Drama, reunion
- Written by: William M. Finkelstein
- Directed by: Michael Schultz
- Theme music composer: Mike Post
- Country of origin: United States
- Original language: English

Production
- Executive producer: David Madden
- Producer: Phillip M. Goldfarb
- Production location: Vancouver, British Columbia, Canada
- Cinematography: Robert Seaman
- Editor: Lori Jane Coleman
- Running time: 120 min
- Production company: Fox Television Studios

Original release
- Network: NBC
- Release: May 12, 2002

Related
- L.A. Law

L.A. Law: The Movie is a 2002 American made-for-television drama film based on the 1986–1994 television series L.A. Law which reunited most of the original cast, although not all prominent cast members returned, including Blair Underwood (Jonathan Rollins), Jimmy Smits (Victor Sifuentes), Amanda Donohoe (C.J. Lamb) and John Spencer (Tommy Mullaney). The film aired on NBC on May 12, 2002.

The film's initial working title was L.A. Law: Return To Justice.

== Synopsis ==
In the eight years since the series ended, founding senior partner Leland McKenzie has retired and left Douglas Brackman Jr. as the senior managing partner. New employees to the firm are Brackman's over-achieving son, Jason, who's at odds with his father, and ambitious, conniving associate Chloe Carpenter, who is at odds with others. Former partner Michael Kuzak, now retired and a successful restaurant owner, is called back to help stop the impending execution of a former client. The opposing counsel is Kuzak's old flame Grace Van Owen, who had since been elected District Attorney. Meanwhile, divorce lawyer Arnie Becker deals with a tough divorce: his own. Arnie's estranged young wife has hired former McKenzie Brackman lawyer Abby Perkins. Office manager Roxanne Melman deals with her ex-husband, Dave Meyer, who claims that he is dying and wants to spend some quality time with her. Also, married partners Ann Kelsey and Stuart Markowitz find themselves the victims of a scam artist.

== Cast ==
- Corbin Bernsen as Arnie Becker
- Susan Dey as District Attorney Grace Van Owen
- Larry Drake as Benny Stulwicz
- Richard Dysart as Leland McKenzie
- Jill Eikenberry as Ann Kelsey
- Dann Florek as Dave Meyer
- Michele Greene as Abby Perkins
- Harry Hamlin as Michael Kuzak
- Alan Rachins as Douglas Brackman Jr.
- Susan Ruttan as Roxanne Melman
- Michael Tucker as Stuart Markowitz
- Bruce Davison as Lawrence Diebenkorn
- Steven Williams as Albert Hutchinson
- Gedde Watanabe as Cyril
- Josie Davis as Chloe Carpenter
- Jason Peck as Jason Brackman
- Bruklin Harris as Raylene Hutchinson
- Hrothgar Mathews as Warren
- Claudette Mink as Belinda James
- Ingrid Torrance as Lara Becker
- Kevin McNulty as Max Bettencart

== Production ==
Following the cancellation of L.A. Law by NBC after eight seasons, discussions began about the possibility of a two-hour TV movie in order to wrap up storylines of the series. In May 2001, it was announced NBC was moving forward with a reunion film of L.A. Law.
