= Daddy's Girl (1996 film) =

- Directed by: Martin Kitrosser
- Written by: Steve Pesce
- Produced by: Richard Brandes; Pierre David
- Starring: William Katt; Michele Greene; Roxana Zal; Mimi Craven; Peggy McCay; Whip Hubley; Gabrielle Boni
- Cinematography: M. David Mullen
- Edited by: Julian Semilian
- Music by: Parmer Fuller
- Production companies: The Image Organization; Ventana Productions
- Distributed by: Live Entertainment
- Release date: December 23, 1996 (VHS)
- Running time: 95 minutes
- Country: United States
- Language: English

Daddy's Girl is a 1996 American direct-to-video slasher film directed by Martin Kitrosser on a screenplay by Steven Pesce, starring William Katt, Michele Greene, Roxana Zal, and Gabrielle Boni.

== Plot ==
Ten-year-old girl, Jody, is adopted by a loving couple, Don, and Barbara Mitchell. Jody develops an obsession with her father and paranoia and jealousy about others spending time with him. This leads her to become psychopathic and so envious of his relationships with other people she sets out to remove these people from her father's life.

Jody kills her principal, Mrs. Hemp, for suggesting that Jody may need to be placed in a state-run boarding school, where she will only see her father on weekends, because of her behavioral problems the past school year. Jody goes to the school when only Mrs. Hemp is there and tricks her into standing on a chair to retrieve a book from a high shelf. Jody then pushes the chair out from under her principal, and proceeds to tip the bookcase over onto her prostrate form, crushing her to death. Jody then steals her student file and rips it to shreds at the local park.

Don and Barbara's marriage is becoming strained because of Don's constant spoiling of Jody and the fact that Barbara has to be the breadwinner since Don is working as a toy designer but his projects are not selling. Barbara vents her frustrations to various people, who tell her to divorce Don and take custody of Jody. Jody's maternal grandmother, Jacqueline, is one of the first to do so and, in response to this, Jody pours drain cleaning fluid into Jacqueline's juice one day when Jacqueline is at their house for brunch. She tries to trick Jacqueline into drinking by toasting her father as a great toy designer, but Jacqueline refuses to drink to this. Don almost drinks the spiked juice himself, but Jody immediately stops him from doing so. Later, Jody goes to Jacqueline's house and suggests playing a game of hide-and-seek with her so they can grow closer. Tricking Jacqueline into going upstairs and playing a cassette of her crying for help, Jody shoves her grandmother down the stairs.

Jacqueline survives the fall, but goes into a coma. She is later killed in the hospital when Jody sabotages her ventilator after waking up from her coma and fearfully recognizing Jody. Later, Jody kills her mother's friend Rachel, a divorce lawyer, as Jody had overheard Rachel advising Barbara to consider divorcing Don, by beating her to death with a fireplace poker.

During the course of the film, Jody's adoptive cousin, Karen Conners, a college student who has been staying with the family for the summer, becomes suspicious of Jody's behavior. She begins investigating Jody's past, despite Barbara's insistence that she mind her own business, and discovers that as a 4 year old toddler, Jody witnessed the murder of her biological father by her biological mother, and that she had been removed from her previous foster home when her foster father was convicted of child neglect after his wife was killed for being a "nag", suspiciously similar to that of Jody's recently deceased adoptive grandmother (it’s implied that Jody killed her previous foster mother). This causes Karen to alert social services.

At the end of the film, Jody pushes Barbara over the edge of a balcony upon discovering that she is on the verge of finding out about Jody's crimes, but this does not kill her. When the social worker, Mark Springer, arrives at Jody's home, Jody bludgeons him to death with a heavy meat tenderizing mallet, then tries to pin it on Karen. Don, who was at a toy convention, returns home after telling Barbara that she no longer has to be the breadwinner as he successfully sold a design for a lot of money, only to find the body of Springer and his wife injured on the ground. Despite Jody desperately trying to not get Don to see that she was responsible for all the crimes she committed, Barbara manages to tell Don everything while Karen calls 911.

Jody begins crying, saying that everyone is against her and begs Don to comfort her and love her. But Don, now knowing what his adopted daughter is capable of, refuses to comfort her, completely disgusted by her actions, and pushes her away, practically disowning Jody as his daughter. Don and Karen then continue to comfort Barbara while ignoring Jody, who still cries over the fact that Don doesn't love her and that everyone is against her, failing to realize the true reasons why. The movie closes with Jody's crying and the sound of police sirens in the background, giving implication to Jody's potential fate of being arrested or institutionalized.

== Cast ==
- William Katt as Don Mitchell
- Michele Greene as Barbara Mitchell
- Roxana Zal as Karen Conners
- Mimi Craven as Rachel Landers
- Peggy McCay as Jacqueline Jones - Grandmother
- Whip Hubley as Mark Springer
- Gabrielle Boni as Jody Mitchell
- Ruth Manning as Victoria Hemp
- Lindsay Ridgeway as Claire Eloise Landers
- Madison Mason as William Tucker
- Freda Foh Shen as Dr. Ellen Marsh
- Christopher Kriesa as Dr. Richardson
- Sarah Long as Nurse

== Release ==
The film was released straight-to-VHS on December 23, 1996 by Live Entertainment. The film has not been re-released ever since, and is unavailable on DVD or Blu-ray. The film did eventually get released on DVD in Canada on April 26, 2005 by Seville Pictures, though it has also since gone out of print.
