= Red Line (1996 film) =

- Directed by: John Sjogren
- Written by: John Sjogren; Rolfe Kanefsky; Scott Ziehl
- Produced by: Chad McQueen; John Sjogren; Scott Ziehl
- Starring: Chad McQueen; Dom DeLuise; Michael Madsen; Roxana Zal; Jan-Michael Vincent; Corey Feldman
- Cinematography: Kevin McKay
- Edited by: John Sjogren; Scott Ziehl
- Music by: Craig Carothers; Jim Walker
- Release date: 1996
- Running time: 102 minutes
- Country: United States
- Language: English

Red Line is a 1996 American action film written and directed by John Sjogren, and starring Chad McQueen, Dom DeLuise, Michael Madsen, Roxana Zal, Jan-Michael Vincent and Corey Feldman.

Immediately prior to filming, Jan-Michael Vincent was in a severe car accident that left his face badly scarred. He can be seen still wearing his hospital ID wrist bracelet in the movie. It was written into the script that Vincent's character had been in a car accident, and he needed new shocks from McQueen's character, a mechanic.

== Plot ==
Jim is a car mechanic who is drawn into danger after he robs a convenience store while driving a client's bulletproof car. He returns the car to the client, Keller, who demands that he bring him a Ferrari held by a couple in the mountains. Jim also meets a young woman, Gem, who he tries to impress. He's successful in bringing Keller the car, only for him to order Jim to bring him a Ferrari and then a Corvette. He manages to acquire the cars, but with great difficulty and collateral damage. While acquiring the Corvette Jim is confronted and threatened with death, but also manages to save Gem from an abusive boyfriend. He is also pursued by a man called Mr. Lawrence, who wants the diamonds hidden in the Corvette.

Ultimately Jim manages to bring Keller the Corvette, which is now demolished from all of the action and from having exploded due to an accident. Keller orders him to leave, which Jim does, taking the burned Corvette to fix it. Just as he's leaving, Mr. Lawrence and Keller, as well as their men, open fire on each other. Meanwhile, Jim and Gem board a bus and leave town. Gem asks Jim what happened to Keller and he doesn't know.

== Cast ==
- Chad McQueen as Jim
- Dom DeLuise as Jerry
- Michael Madsen as Mr. Lawrence
- Roxana Zal as "Gem"
- Jan-Michael Vincent as Keller
- Corey Feldman as Tony
- Robert Z'Dar as Gene
- Julie Strain as Crystal
- Billy Million as Frank
- Chuck Zito as Dick

The film also includes small roles and cameos by Joe Estevez and Ron Jeremy.

== Production ==
While filming Sjogren suggested that Zito's character urinate on himself after fighting with McQueen's character Jim. Zito refused and suggested a different action, which met with the director's approval.

== Reception ==
The Austin Chronicle reviewed the film, stating that "All told, this is one entertainingly brainless mess of a Nineties B-movie." TV Guide panned Red Line, writing "McQueen (son of Steve McQueen) and Madsen both breeze through their parts with a minimum of expression, while Zal jettisons any viewer sympathy when she casually abandons her best girlfriend to an uncertain fate at Keller's hands. She and McQueen are nonetheless heroes-by-default in the pointless script."
