= Roxana Zal =

American actress (born 1969)

- Born: November 8, 1969 (age 56); Malibu, California, U.S.
- Occupations: Actress, Fashion designer
- Years active: 1981–2006

Roxana Zal (born November 8, 1969) is an American former actress and fashion designer. In 1984, at the age of 14, she became the youngest Primetime Emmy Award winner for her title role in the television film Something About Amelia. She also appeared in the films Table for Five and Testament in 1983, and River's Edge in 1986.

== Early life ==
Zal was born and raised in Malibu, California, the daughter of Maureen and Hossein Zal, an Iranian-born Los Angeles investor. Zal was keen to take up acting when aged 8, however her parents resisted, until her aunt persuaded them to allow her several years later.

== Career ==
She began acting aged 11 and secured her first acting role as a guest spot on Hart to Hart towards the end of 1981.

In 1983, Zal appeared in the films Table for Five starring Jon Voight and Testament opposite Jane Alexander. In 1984 she won a Primetime Emmy Award for her role in the television film Something About Amelia. She also received a Golden Globe Award for Best Supporting Actress – Series, Miniseries or Television Film nomination for her performance. Zal later starred in the 1986 independent crime film River's Edge and in 1989 starred in the teen romantic drama film Under the Boardwalk. In 1989, she appeared as young mother Cissy McClure in Everybody's Baby: The Rescue of Jessica McClure, the real life story about the rescue of Jessica McClure two years prior. At the time, she was a second-year student at the University of California, Los Angeles (UCLA) and filmed the role while studying world arts and cultures.

In 1990, Zal appeared in a number of made-for-television and independent films playing supporting roles. She also guest starred in a number of television series, including Lois & Clark: The New Adventures of Superman, The Pretender and NCIS. In 2006, she was a regular cast member on the MyNetworkTV telenovela Watch Over Me.

Zal left acting and became a fashion designer in the 2000s.

== Filmography ==
=== Film ===
Year	Title	Role	Notes
1983	Table for Five	Tilde	Young Artist Award for Best Leading Young Actress in a Feature Film
1983	Testament	Mary Liz Wetherly	Nominated — Young Artist Award for Best Young Actress in a Motion Picture - Musical, Comedy, Adventure or Drama
1986	River's Edge	Maggie	
1988	Goodbye, Miss 4th of July		
1989	Under the Boardwalk	Gitch	
1995	Red Line	Gem	
1996	Kiss & Tell	Sissy	
1996	The First Man	Nan	
1996	Daddy's Girl	Karen Conners	Direct-to-video
1997	Firestorm	Lara	
1998	The Waterfront	Cristina	
1998	Broken Vessels	Elizabeth	Also producer Los Angeles Independent Film Festival Award for Best Feature Film
2000	Her Married Lover	Katie Griffin	Alternate Title: A Clean Kill
2000	Ground Zero	Victoria Heflin	
2001	Blind Obsession	Bedelia Rose	
2004	Three Way	Janice Brookbank	

=== Television ===
Year	Title	Role	Notes
1981	Hart to Hart	Riley	Episode: "The Hartbreak Kid"; Young Artist Award for Best Young Actress, Guest on a Series
1982	Walt Disney's Wonderful World of Color	Marilee	Episode: "The Adventures of Pollyanna"
1984	Something About Amelia	Amelia Bennet	Television movie Primetime Emmy Award for Outstanding Supporting Actress in a Miniseries or a Movie; Nominated—Golden Globe Award for Best Supporting Actress – Series, Miniseries or Television Film
1986	Shattered Spirits	Lesley Mollencamp	Television movie
1986	CBS Schoolbreak Special	Allie Newton	Episode: "God, the Universe & Hot Fudge Sundaes"; Young Artist Award for Exceptional Young Actress Starring in a Television Special or Movie of the Week
1989	Everybody's Baby: The Rescue of Jessica McClure	Cissy McClure	Television movie
1990	Daughter of the Streets	Charley	Television movie
1992	CBS Schoolbreak Special	Michael's sister	Episode: "Please, God, I'm Only Seventeen"
1992	Something to Live for: The Alison Gertz Story	Tracy	Television movie
1993	Deadly Relations	Marty	Television movie
1993	The Hidden Room	Marion	Episode: "Marion & Jean"
1995	Lois & Clark: The New Adventures of Superman	Lucy Lane	Episode: "Metallo"
1998	Fame L.A.	Tina	Episode: "Haunting Refrains"
1998	The Pretender	Carla Parks	Episode: "Silence"
1998	Mixed Blessings	Laura	
1999	Primal Force	Tara Matthews	Television movie
2003	Crossing Jordan	Mrs. Strahan	Episode: "John Doe"
2004	NCIS	Marie Foley	Episode: "UnSEALED"
2006	Watch Over Me	Natalie Weller	64 episodes
