= Wes Nisker =

American Buddhist teacher and author (1942–2023)

- Born: December 22, 1942; Norfolk, Nebraska, U.S.
- Died: July 31, 2023 (aged 80); Oakland, California, U.S.
- Other name: Scoop
- Occupations: Author; radio commentator; comedian; meditation instructor
- Website: www.wesnisker.com

Wes "Scoop" Nisker (December 22, 1942 – July 31, 2023) was an American author, radio commentator, comedian, and Buddhist meditation instructor. He was a fixture on the San Francisco free-form radio station KSAN in the late 1960s and 1970s, and later was heard regularly on KFOG. He was well known for the catchphrase, "If you don't like the news ... go out and make some of your own," which he also used as the title for a 1994 book.

Nisker's radio features could be unconventional, like this traffic report: "People are driving to work to earn the money to pay for the cars they're driving to work in. Back to you." He and his books were covered in various publications of record. He was the founder and co-editor of the international Theravada Buddhist journal Inquiring Mind and was one of the regular teachers at the Spirit Rock Meditation Center in Marin County, California.

Steve Feinstein of Radio & Records wrote of Nisker's work in 1985: "Nisker is the dean of FM rock radio newspeople. Since 1968 and the days of progressive pioneer KSAN, he's been crafting irreverent, satirical sound collages that present news as an ongoing drama in the theater of life. The timing and rhythm of his work brings to mind music; no wonder that two record albums have compiled his newscasts."

Nisker was Jewish and his father was a Polish Jewish immigrant.

Nisker died on July 31, 2023, from complications of Lewy body dementia.

== Bibliography ==
- Nisker, Wes (1994). If You Don't Like the News ... Go Out and Make Some of Your Own. Ten Speed Press. ISBN 978-0-89815-626-3.
- Nisker, Wes (1998). Crazy Wisdom. Ten Speed Press. ISBN 978-1-58008-040-8.
- Nisker, Wes (1999). Buddha's Nature: Who We Really Are and Why This Matters. Rider. ISBN 978-0-7126-7066-1.
- Nisker, Wes (2000). Buddha's Nature: A Practical Guide to Discovering Your Place in the Cosmos. Bantam Books. ISBN 978-0-553-37999-0.
- Nisker, Wes (1998). Buddha's Nature: Evolution as a Practical Guide to Enlightenment. Bantam Books. ISBN 978-0-553-10601-5.
- Nisker, Wes (2004). The Big Bang, The Buddha, and the Baby Boom: The Spiritual Experiments of My Generation. HarperCollins. ISBN 978-0-06-251767-8.
- Nisker, Wes (2008). Crazy Wisdom Saves the World Again!: Handbook for a Spiritual Revolution. Stone Bridge Press. ISBN 978-1-933330-69-3.
- Nisker, Wes (2016). You Are Not Your Fault and Other Revelations: The Collected Wit and Wisdom of Wes "Scoop" Nisker. Soft Skull Press. ISBN 978-1-61902-769-5.
