= Martial Law (1991 film) =

1991 US action film by Steve Cohen

- Promotional release poster
- Directed by: Steve Cohen
- Written by: Richard Brandes
- Produced by: Kurt Anderson
- Starring: Chad McQueen; Cynthia Rothrock; David Carradine
- Cinematography: John Huneck
- Edited by: Michael Thibault
- Music by: Elliot Solomon
- Distributed by: Various
- Release date: May 16, 1991
- Running time: 89 minutes
- Country: United States
- Language: English

Martial Law is a 1990 American action/martial arts film written by Richard Brandes, produced by Kurt Anderson, directed by Steve Cohen and stars Chad McQueen, Cynthia Rothrock and David Carradine. It is the first installment in the Martial Law film series.

== Plot ==
Sean Thompson (Chad McQueen) and his partner Billie Blake (Cynthia Rothrock) are a pair of cops on the front line in the city's never ending war on crime. In addition to the routine small-time robberies they're dealing with on a daily basis, they must face the dangerous Dalton Rhodes (David Carradine), a smuggler of guns and stolen luxury cars, and a master of martial arts. Police are finding one body after another of mafia related people (all killed with bare hands). Sean and Billie have only vague clues in this case and no idea who's actually behind those murders. An aid in solving the riddle is to come from Sean's troubled younger brother Michael, who's working for Rhodes. Soon he'll learn that an easy way to get rich is also extremely dangerous and sometimes lethal.

== Cast ==
- Chad McQueen as Officer Sean Thompson
- Cynthia Rothrock as Officer Billie Blake
- David Carradine as Dalton Rhoades
- Andy McCutcheon as Michael Thompson
- Philip Tan as Wu Han
- Tony Longo as Booker
- John Fujioka as Chang
- Vincent Craig Dupree as "Faster" Brown
- Jim Malinda as Captain Sykes
- Rick Walters as Colonel Cramer
- Patricia Wilson as Grace
- Lars Lundgren as Ruppin
- Professor Toru Tanaka as Jimmy Kong

== Release ==
=== Home media ===
The film was released directly to VHS in 1991 by Media Home Entertainment and CBS/FOX. The film has been released on DVD in Europe, by Bellevue entertainment. It is part of movie package (contains four movies on two DVDs), along with Savate, Martial Law II: Undercover, and Mission of Justice.

On November 27, 2020, the cult label Vinegar Syndrome revealed a Blu-ray double feature of Martial Law and Martial Law II as part of their VSA line of limited editions, with both films remastered in 4K from their original camera negatives, marking their first release in the US since VHS.

== Sequel ==
A sequel titled Martial Law 2: Undercover was released in 1991.
