= Firepower (1993 film) =

1993 film directed by Richard Pepin

- Directed by: Richard Pepin
- Written by: Michael January
- Produced by: Richard Pepin; Joseph Merhi
- Starring: Gary Daniels
- Cinematography: Ken Blakey
- Edited by: Frank Sacco
- Music by: John Gonzalez
- Production company: PM Entertainment
- Distributed by: PM Entertainment
- Release date: October 25, 1993
- Running time: 96 minutes
- Country: United States
- Language: English

Firepower is a 1993 science-fiction action film directed by Richard Pepin and starring Chad McQueen, Gary Daniels, Joseph Ruskin and Jim Hellwig in his first and only acting role. In it, two near future cops (McQueen and Daniels) investigate a counterfeit AIDS vaccine originating from a lawless no-go zone, and get drawn into a deadly underground fighting circuit, whose champion is a deranged swordsman (Hellwig). The dystopian film does not feature any daylight scenes.

== Cast ==
- Chad McQueen as Darren Braniff
- Gary Daniels as Nick Sledge
- George Murdock as Captain Croy
- Joseph Ruskin as Theodore Drexal
- Alisha Das as Lisa
- Jim Hellwig as The Swordsman
- Pablo Marz as Mendez
- Art Camacho as Viper
- Dennis Garber as Booking Officer
- Michael Gregory as Chief Handler
- Vanessa Hampton as Boone
- Kimberly Cockrell as Sue Braniff
- Taylor Leigh as Newscaster
- Peter Gonneau as Bill Russel

== Production ==
=== Casting ===
Firepower marked the acting debut of professional wrestler Jim Hellwig, best known as "The Ultimate Warrior," who underwent training with karate instructor Richard Rabago and the film's fight coordinator Art Camacho for three weeks in advance of the shoot. It was Gary Daniels' fourth film for PM Entertainment, and his first in a top billed role. The Briton originally turned down PM's offer, as the salary was not to his liking, and he had no interest in doing another deathmatch movie. But after their execs insisted he read the script, he realized that the role was sizeable, with more fun banter than his bread-and-butter work. After consulting with his agent, he decided to sign on. He also requested that his fights be choreographed by his own martial arts instructor, Winston Omega.

=== Filming ===
Filming started on March 1, 1993, and continued for the rest of the month. The exterior of the Death Ring's venue was represented by the historic Palace Theatre in downtown Los Angeles, but there is no indication that the fights set inside were actually captured there. It was the first PM film shot at their brand new studios in Sun Valley, California, although other parts took place at a third-party facility, the Lacy Street studios, also in Los Angeles. The 2nd Street Tunnel between Hill and Figueroa was the location for the film's opening setpiece. The second chase features a GM Futurliner, one of the model's very few appearances in live action fiction, and possibly the only one.

While PM's trademark vehicular stunts required entire streets to be blocked off at night for up to a week, the martial arts sequences received less attention. All the Death Ring scenes were crammed into the last two days, and all the masters were done in a single day. The actors had to perform the whole fight in a continuous take in front of the same three cameras, which starkly contrasted with the minutia Daniels had witnessed in Hong Kong. The Londoner enjoyed collaborating with Hellwig, although his size and wrestling background made him a much slower performer than he was used to. While Daniels did not personally have issues with Chad McQueen, director/producer Richard Pepin was dissatisfied with the latter's work ethic.

== Release ==
=== Pre-release ===
Although Gary Daniels was Chad McQueen's sidekick, the PM gave him a preferential place on the poster based on how the film had turned out. It was a strong seller at the 1993 Cannes Film Market, even though no workprint could be completed in time for the event.

=== Home video ===
Firepower was premiered domestically on VHS through PM Entertainment on January 26, 1994. Image Entertainment also released a LaserDisc version on August 6, 1994.

== Reception ==
Firepower has received mixed-to-positive reviews. The BBC's RadioTimes Guide to Science-Fiction "predictably efficient thriller" and noted that "[e]very post-apocalypse cliché is present and correct, but the fight sequences will satisfy the more undemanding fans of the genre." British reference book Elliot's Guide to Home Entertainment called it "[a] derivative and brutal actioner with few futuristic elements but no shortage of violence." In his publication VideoScope, genre critic Joe Kane found the film "ruggedly staged and decently acted, Firepower plays a lot better than its clichéd plot synopsis reads.[...] Highlights include several excitingly choreographed matches, an Assault on Precinct 13-style shoot-out, and Das's foxy presence. While not in the class of once and future king of wrestlers-turned-actors Tor Johnson, Hellwig is at least easier to take than Hulk Hogan or Jesse Ventura."
