= List of Kolkata Presidencians =

The following is a list of notable people associated with the old Presidency College, Calcutta.

== Academics ==
- Partha Chatterjee (scholar), professor of anthropology at Columbia University
- Abhijit Banerjee, professor at Massachusetts Institute of Technology, winner of the Nobel Memorial Prize in Economics in 2019
- Abhijit Basu, professor of geology, Indiana University Bloomington
- Joyoti Basu, cell biologist, N-Bios laureate
- Ratan Lal Basu, Specialist in ancient economics and Indologist
- Birendra Bijoy Biswas, Botanist and molecular biologist, Shanti Swarup Bhatnagar laureate
- Barun De, Former Chairman, West Bengal Heritage Commission and Founder-Director, Centre for Studies in Social Sciences, Calcutta.
- Jitendra Nath Mohanty, philosopher, former president of the Indian Philosophical Congress
- Sankar Das Sarma, eminent theoretical condensed matter physicist and Richard E Prange Chaired Professor at University of Maryland, US
- Amartya Sen, Master, Trinity College, Cambridge (1998–2004); winner of the Nobel Prize in Economics, 1998
- Ashoke Sen, professor at the International Centre for Theoretical Sciences (ICTS), Bangalore, winner of Dirac Medal in 2014 and first Indian physicist to win Oscar Klein Medal in 2026.
- Surajit Chandra Sinha, former Vice Chancellor, Visva-Bharati, Santiniketan; Maharajkumar of Susanga, Bengal
- Sourindra Mohan Sircar, one of the greatest botanist of India. Was appointed the General President of ISCA
- Gayatri Chakravorty Spivak, scholar, literary theorist, and feminist critic, holder of University Professor at Columbia University
- Kshirode Prasad Vidyavinode, Bengali poet, novelist, dramatist and nationalist and a professor of Chemistry at Chandernagore Dupleix College and later at Scottish Church College.
- Krishna Chandra Bhattacharya, modern Indian philosopher renowned for his method of constructive interpretation, a scholarly approach employed to elucidate and elaborate upon the interrelationships and intricacies inherent in ancient Indian philosophy.
- Nabaneeta Dev Sen, Bengali author, academic, professor of Comparative Literature at Jadavpur University.
- Amar Nath Bhaduri, an Indian molecular enzymologist and chemical biologist, known for his studies on UDP-glucose 4-epimerase, a homodimeric epimerase found in cells and his work on Leishmania donovani, the protozoal pathogen for Kala-azar.
- Amal Kumar Raychaudhuri, Indian physicist, known for his research in general relativity and cosmology.
- Dipesh Chakrabarty, historian and leading scholar of postcolonial theory and subaltern studies.
- Gautam Bhadra, historian of South Asia and was a member of the erstwhile Subaltern Studies collective.
- Ranajit Guha, a prominent Indian historian and a seminal figure among the early architects of the Subaltern Studies collective.
- Sudipta Kaviraj, distinguished scholar specializing in the domains of South Asian Politics and Intellectual History, frequently aligned with the disciplines of Postcolonial and Subaltern Studies.
- Parama Nath Bhaduri, renowned agricultural scientist.
- Sekhar Bandyopadhyay, historian and a Fellow of the Royal Society Te Apārangi, known for his research on the Dalit caste of Bengal.
- Susobhan Sarkar, renowned Indian historian.
- Sumit Sarkar, historian of Modern India and a founding member of the Subaltern Studies Group as well as one of its most important critics.
- Tanika Sarkar, historian of modern India based at the Jawaharlal Nehru University. Sarkar's work focuses on the intersections of religion, gender, and politics in both colonial and postcolonial South Asia, in particular on women and the Hindu Right.
- Hem Chandra Raychaudhuri, historian, known for his studies on ancient India.
- Tapan Raychaudhuri, British-Indian historian specialising in British Indian history, Indian economic history and the History of Bengal.
- Rajat Kanta Ray, Indian historian of South Asian history, specialising in Modern Indian history.
- Ashin Das Gupta, renowned historian of Indian Ocean World.
- Dwijendra Narayan Jha, Marxist historian who studied and wrote on ancient and medieval India.
- Amiya Kumar Bagchi, Indian economic historian.
- Jasodhara Bagchi, leading Indian feminist professor, author, critic and activist.
- Sugata Bose, historian and politician who has taught and worked in the United States since the mid-1980s. His fields of study are South Asian and Indian Ocean history.
- Samik Bandyopadhyay, Kolkata-based critic of Indian art, theatre and film.
- Krishna Bose, Indian politician, educator, author and social worker.
- Jnan Chandra Ghosh, Indian chemist best known for his contribution to the development of scientific research, industrial development and technology education in India. He served as the director of the newly formed Eastern Higher Technical Institute in 1950, which was renamed as IIT Kharagpur in 1951. He was also the director of the Indian Institute of Science Bangalore and Vice Chancellor of the University of Calcutta.
- Nirmal Kumar Bose, Indian anthropologist, who played a formative role in "building an Indian Tradition in Anthropology".
- Kaliprasanna Vidyaratna, Indian scholar of Sanskrit, academic and author. He was the principal of the Sanskrit College between 1908 and 1910.
- Sukhamoy Chakraborty, Indian economist and one of the key architects of the Five Year Plans.
- Prasanta Chandra Mahalanobis, Indian scientist and statistician. He is best remembered for the Mahalanobis distance, a statistical measure, and for being one of the members of the first Planning Commission of free India. He made pioneering studies in anthropometry in India.
- The Hon'ble Babu Mahendranath Ray, CIE,, one of the earliest faculties of the Indian Association for the Cultivation of Science, one of the founders of Asutosh College and the first elected Indian members of the Senate of the University of Calcutta.
- Satyendra Nath Bose, Indian theoretical physicist and mathematician. He is best known for his work on quantum mechanics in the early 1920s, in developing the foundation for Bose–Einstein statistics, and the theory of the Bose–Einstein condensate.
- Sir Jagadish Chandra Bose, polymath with interests in biology, physics and writing science fiction. He was a pioneer in the investigation of radio microwave optics, made significant contributions to botany, and was a major force behind the expansion of experimental science on the Indian subcontinent.
- Rai Bahadur Sir Upendranath Brahmachari, prominent Indian physician and scientist.
- Sir Jadunath Sarkar, prominent Indian historian and a specialist on the Mughal dynasty.
- Hara Prasad Shastri, Indian academic, Sanskrit scholar, archivist, and historian of Bengali literature. He is most known for discovering the Charyapada, the earliest known examples of Bengali literature.
- Hem Chandra Dasgupta, Indian geologist and a professor of geology at Presidency College and Calcutta University.
- Romesh Chunder Dutt, Indian civil servant, economic historian, translator of Ramayana and Mahabharata.
- Suniti Kumar Chatterji, Indian linguist, educationist and litterateur.
- Mahendralal Sarkar, Bengali medical doctor (MD), the second MD graduated from the Calcutta Medical College, social reformer, and propagator of scientific studies in nineteenth-century India.
- Muhammad Shahidullah, Bengali linguist, philologist, educationist, and writer.
- Mihir Rakshit, Indian economist, known for his work on fiscal, monetary and other policy, especially issues that concern developing economies.
- Dipak Banerjee, Indian economist and taught at Presidency College, eventually becoming the head of the Economics Department.
- Debraj Ray, Indian-American economist, who is currently teaching and working at New York University. His research interests focus on development economics and game theory.
- Amita Chatterjee, philosopher of science and logician, first vice-chancellor of Presidency University Kolkata.
- Malabika Sarkar, Indian academic, former Vice-Chancellor of Ashoka University, and a former Vice Chancellor of Presidency University, Kolkata.
- Somak Raychaudhury, Indian astrophysicist.
- Sivatosh Mookerjee, researcher and a scientist contributing to the field of Developmental Biology, particularly studies related to Hydra and amphibian embryos.
- Benimadhab Barua, Indian scholar of ancient Indian languages, Buddhism and law.
- Atindra Mohan Goon, renowned statistician and later joined the Statics department and had strongly pleaded for the autonomy of Presidency College in the early 1980s.
- Prafulla Chandra Ray, Indian chemist, educationist, historian, industrialist and philanthropist.
- Rajnarayan Basu, Indian writer and intellectual of the Bengal Renaissance.
- Sisir Kumar Mitra, Indian physicist.
- Meghnad Saha, Indian astrophysicist and politician who helped devise the theory of thermal ionisation.
- Peary Chand Mitra, Indian writer, journalist, cultural activist and entrepreneur.
- Peary Charan Sarkar, educationist and textbook writer in nineteenth century Bengal.
- Sukanta Chaudhuri, Indian literary scholar, now Professor Emeritus at Jadavpur University, Kolkata.
- Bhabatosh Datta, noted Indian economist, academic and writer.
- Supriya Chaudhuri, Indian scholar of English literature and Professor Emerita at Kolkata's Jadavpur University.
- Subhoranjan Dasgupta, specialising in the Partitition of 1947, Neo-Marxian aesthetics and creativity of Gunter Grass and Akhtaruzzaman Elias, also professor of human sciences, Institute of Development Studies, Kolkata.
- Rudrangshu Mukherjee, historian of Modern India,former Opinions Editor for The Telegraph newspaper, Kolkata and the Chancellor for Ashoka University, where he also serves as Professor of History.
- Sobhanlal Datta Gupta, former Surendra Nath Banerjee Professor of Political Science at the University of Calcutta, and one of the most distinguished scholars of Marxism in India.
- Anuradha Roy, historian of intellectual and cultural history of modern Bengal.
- Supratim Das, historian and Vice Principal of Scottish Church College.
- Boria Majumdar, Indian sports journalist, sports historian and writer.
- Subhas Ranjan Chakraborty, Professor of European history at Presidency College and has written on the history of Modern Europe, Darjeeling, and on sports history in South Asia.
- Tapati Guha-Thakurta, Indian historian who has written about the cultural history and art of India.
- Nikhil Ranjan Sen, Scientist who was a pioneer in the field of general relativity and called the father of applied mathematics in India.

== Actors and Film Makers ==
- Ashok Kumar, Actor
- Chhabi Biswas, Actor
- Dhritiman Chatterjee, Actor
- Ritwik Ghatak, Film Maker
- Pritish Nandy, Film Maker
- Pramathesh Barua, Actor and Film Maker
- Satyajit Ray, Film Maker
- Bikash Roy, Actor
- Aparna Sen, Actor, Film Maker
- Srijit Mukherji, Film Maker

== Administration ==
- Jawhar Sircar, Indian Administrative Service (IAS), Union Culture Secretary(2008-13), who organised the 150th Birth Anniversary celebrations of Tagore and Vivekananda on a grand scale, nationally and internationally. He later became CEO, Prasar Bharati and then MP, Rajya Sabha.
- Gurusaday Dutt, ICS, Secretary, Local Self Government and Public Health Secretary, Government of Bengal
- Mahendranath Roy, CIE, lawyer, educationist, politician, first elected chairperson of the Howrah Municipal Corporation
- Satyendranath Tagore, Indian civil servant, poet, composer, writer, social reformer and linguist from Calcutta, Bengal. He was the first Indian who became an Indian Civil Service officer in 1863.
- Romesh Chunder Dutt, Indian civil servant, economic historian.
- Bimal Jalan, Indian economist and bureaucrat who served as 20th Governor of Reserve Bank of India.
- Ashok Lahiri, Economist and 4th Vice Chairman of NITI Aayog.
- Sukumar Sen, an Indian civil servant who was the 1st Chief Election Commissioner of India, serving from 21 March 1950 to 19 December 1958.<https://www.eci.gov.in/former-cec-ec>
- Behari Lal Gupta, ICS, His legal brief on judicial racial inequality directly inspired the historic Ilbert Bill
- Bibek Debroy, Chaired both the Indian Prime Minister's Economic Advisory Council and a Finance Ministry expert committee on infrastructure, contributing significantly to game theory, economic theory, and the study of income and social inequalities, law reforms and railway reforms
- Alapan Bandyopadhyay, Indian Administrative Service, Chief Secretary of State for the Government of West Bengal

== Social Reformers ==
- Ramgopal Ghosh, leader of the Young Bengal Group, a successful businessman, orator and social reformer. He is called the 'Demosthenes of India'.
- Raja Ram Mohan Roy,Indian reformer,writer and one of the founders of the Hindu College.
- Babu Mathurmohan Biswas, Indian Zamindar, businessman, philanthropist and the son-in-law of Rani Rashmoni, he was one of the chief disciples of Shri Ramakrishna and his patron, he was instrumental in the founding of the Dakshineswar Kali Temple, he was also responsible for founding the Annapurna Temple at Titagarh.
- Radhakanta Deb, a scholar,leader of the Calcutta conservative Hindu society and one of the founders of the Hindu College.
- David Hare, Scottish watchmaker, philanthropist, and educationist in Bengal. He founded many educational institutions in Calcutta (now Kolkata), such as the Hindu School, and Hare School and helped in founding Presidency College.
- Henry Louis Vivian Derozio,a radical thinker of his time and one of the first Indian educators to disseminate Western learning and science among the young men of Bengal.
- Mahendralal Sarkar, Bengali medical doctor (MD), the second MD graduated from the Calcutta Medical College, social reformer, and propagator of scientific studies in nineteenth-century India. He was the founder of the Indian Association for the Cultivation of Science.

== Businessmen and Industrialists ==
- Subodh Chandra Mallik, Bengali Indian industrialist, philanthropist and nationalist. Mallik is noted as a nationalist intellectual who was one of the co-founders of the Bengal National College, of which he was the principal financial supporter. He was close to Aurobindo Ghosh and financed the latter's nationalist publications, including Bande Mataram.
- Basant Kumar Birla, Indian industrialist and philanthropist of the Birla family.
- Sankar Das Gupta, eminent scientist, inventor, entrepreneur, and philanthropist. Presidency, Imperial College, and D.Sc. (Honoris Causa) from RKMVERI. Founder, Electrovaya, a NASDAQ-listed battery company; Proprietor, Process Research Ortech, a critical materials company; Professor at University of Toronto and Ramakrishna Mission Vivekananda Educational and Research Institute; focus on wealth creation in Bengal utilizing science.
- Ramnath Goenka, Indian newspaper publisher. He bought the majority stake of The Indian Express in 1930s.
- Gagan Chandra Biswas, industrialist and landlord, one of the longest serving members of the Bengal Legislative Council, Co-founder of Martin Burn.

== Faculty Members ==
- Dipak Banerjee, former Head of the Department of Economics of Presidency College, Kolkata
- Henry Louis Vivian Derozio, radical thinker of his time and one of the first Indian educators to disseminate Western learning and science among the young men of Bengal.
- Charles Henry Tawney, English educator and scholar, primarily known for his translations of Sanskrit classics into English.

== Judiciary & Law ==
- Sir Sarat Kumar Ghosh, I.C.S, Chief Justice of Jaipur and Kashmir.
- Gooroodas Banerjee, a judge of the Calcutta High Court in British India. In 1890, he also became the first Indian Vice-Chancellor of University of Calcutta.
- Altamas Kabir, Indian lawyer and judge who served as the 39th Chief Justice of India.
- Sarat Chandra Bose, Indian barrister and independence activist.
- Chittaranjan Das, popularly called Deshbandhu (friend of the country), was an Indian freedom fighter, political activist and lawyer during the Indian Independence Movement and the political guru of Indian freedom fighter Netaji Subhas Chandra Bose. He was the founder-leader of the Swaraj Party in undivided Bengal during the period of British Colonial rule in India. His name is abbreviated as C. R. Das.
- Subimal Chandra Roy, Indian jurist who served on the Supreme Court of India.
- Abu Sadat Mohammad Sayem, Bangladeshi jurist, statesman, Chief Justice of Bangladesh from 1972 to 1975 and the President of Bangladesh from 1975 to 1977.
- Gnanendramohan Tagore, first Bengali, Indian or Asian to be called to the bar in England, in 1862.
- Radhabinod Pal, Indian jurist who was a member of the United Nations' International Law Commission from 1952 to 1966.

== Politicians and Independence Activists ==
- Subhas Chandra Bose, Freedom Fighter, Commander of INA, First Leader of Free Indian Territory, Mayor of Calcutta; 53rd President of the Indian National Congress; founder of the All India Forward Bloc;
- Rajendra Prasad, Indian politician, lawyer, journalist and scholar who served as the first president of India from 1950 to 1962.
- Syama Prasad Mukherjee, founder of Bharatiya Jana Sangh; Industry and Supply Member, Government of India (1946–50)
- Bidhan Chandra Roy, 2nd Chief Minister of West Bengal (1948–1962); 5th Mayor of Kolkata (1931–1933)
- Ajoy Mukherjee, 4th Chief Minister of West Bengal (1 March 1967 – 21 November 1967)
- Siddhartha Shankar Ray, 5th Chief Minister of West Bengal (1972–77); Education Minister, Government of India; Governor of Punjab; Ambassador to U.S.A.
- Jyoti Basu, 6th Chief Minister of West Bengal (1977–2000)
- Buddhadeb Bhattacharya, 7th Chief Minister of West Bengal (2000–2011)
- Mahendranath Roy, lawyer, politician and the first elected chairperson of the Howrah Municipal Corporation
- Ashim Chatterjee, Communist Revolutionary
- Bishnu Ram Medhi, 2nd Chief Minister of Assam (1950–57)
- MJ Akbar, Minister of State for External Affairs, Government of India (2016–2018)
- Abdus Salam Khan, Minister of Public Works and Communication (1955–1956) in the East Pakistan provincial cabinet
- Md. Hafizur Rahman, Minister of Food and Agriculture of Pakistan (1958–1960); Minister of Commerce of Pakistan (1960–1962); Provincial Minister of Finance and Planning of East Pakistan (1962–1965)
- Amit Mitra, Finance Minister of West Bengal (2011–21)
- Gagan Chandra Biswas, industrialist and landlord, one of the longest serving members of the Bengal Legislative Council
- Maharajadhiraja Sir Uday Chand Mahtab, Member of the Bengal Legislative Assembly (1937–52), Member, Indian Constituent Assembly, 1946–47 & Maharajadhiraja Bahadur of Burdwan.
- Colonel H.H. Maharaja Nripendra Narayan Bhup Bahadur of Coochbehar
- Raja Narasingha Malla Deb, OBE, MP, of Jhargram Raj
- Kalyan Roy – former member of the upper house of the Parliament of India
- Shamsuddin Ahmed – Minister of pre-1947 Bengal and first Pakistani ambassador to Burma.
- Ullaskar Dutta,Indian revolutionary associated with Anushilan Samiti and Jugantar of Bengal, and was a close associate of Barindra Ghosh.
- Romesh Chunder Dutt, Indian civil servant, economic historian, translator of Ramayana and Mahabharata and the president of Indian National Congress in 1899 and a member of the Bengal Legislative Council.
- Mohammad Ali Bogra, Pakistani politician and diplomat who served as the third prime minister of Pakistan from 1953 to 1955.
- Humayun Kabir (Bengal politician), Indian educationist and politician. He was also a poet, essayist and novelist in the Bengali-language.
- Kiran Shankar Roy, Indian politician, academic, and freedom fighter.
- Asim Dasgupta, Indian economist and politician affiliated to Communist Party of India (Marxist) and Minister of Finance and Excise in the Left Front ministry in the Indian state of West Bengal (1987-2011).
- Somnath Chatterjee, Indian politician who was associated with the Communist Party of India (Marxist) and the Speaker of the Lok Sabha (House of the People) from 2004 to 2009.
- Prafulla Chandra Ghosh, the first Premier of West Bengal, India from 15 August 1947 to 14 August 1948 and served as the Chief Minister of West Bengal in the "Progressive Democratic Alliance Front" government from 21 November 1967 to 20 February 1968.
- Pratap Chandra Chunder, union minister of India, educationist and writer.
- Basanta Kumar Das, Independence activist, politician, one of the drafters of the Constitution of India
- Munawwar Ali, lawyer, poet and politician who was minister of Assam and first speaker of the East Bengal Legislative Assembly.
- Bashiruddin Ahmad Majmadar, government official and politician who was provincial minister of East Pakistan.

== Religious leader ==
- Swami Vivekananda, the great Nationalist Indian Hindu monk, a chief disciple of the 19th-century Indian teacher Ramakrishna, key figure in the introduction of the Indian philosophies of Vedanta and Yoga to the Western world and is credited with raising interfaith awareness, bringing Hinduism to the status of a major world religion during the late 19th century and founded the Ramakrishna Math and the Ramakrishna Mission.
- Babu Mathurmohan Biswas, Indian Zamindar, businessman, philanthropist and the son-in-law of Rani Rashmoni, he was one of the chief disciples of Shri Ramakrishna and his patron, he was instrumental in the founding of the Dakshineswar Kali Temple, he was also responsible for founding the Annapurna Temple at Titagarh.
- Mahendranath Gupta, disciple of Ramakrishna and a mystic himself.

== Sports ==
- Atiquzzaman Khan, Bangladeshi cricketer, studied history at Presidency College, Calcutta during 1936–1940
- Vece Paes, Indian Hockey Player, studied Pre-Medical at Presidency College, Calcutta during 1964–65
- Abbas Mirza, Football Player, Captain of Kolkata Mohammedan during 1935–39

== Writers ==
- Bankim Chandra Chattopadhyay,Indian Bengali novelist, poet, essayist.
- Jyotirindranath Tagore, Bengali playwright, musician, editor, and painter.
- Rabindranath Tagore, Bengali polymath who worked as a poet, writer, playwright, composer, philosopher, social reformer, and painter of the Bengal Renaissance. He attended classes at Presidency College for a single day.
- Manik Bandyopadhyay, author regarded as one of the major figures of 20th century Bengali literature.
- Rajshekhar Basu, Bengali chemist, author and lexicographer. He was chiefly known for his comic and satirical short stories, and is considered the greatest Bengali humorist of the 20th century.
- Ratan Lal Basu, economist and English fiction author.
- Shakti Chattopadhyay, poet and writer who wrote in Bengali, known for his realistic depictions of rural life. He was a green poet, many of his poems raised the issue of nature in crisis.
- Henry Louis Vivan Derozio, poet
- Michael Madhusudan Dutt, Poet, Dramatist
- Sankha Ghosh, Indian poet and literary critic.
- Binoy Majumdar, Bengali poet who received the Sahitya Akademi Award in 2005.
- Pritish Nandy, Indian poet, painter, journalist, politician, media and television personality, animal activist and maker of films, television and streaming content.
- Satyajit Ray, Fiction Author and fim director.
- Bibek Debroy, Scholar, Translator, Economist
- Ketaki Kushari Dyson, Bengali-born poet, novelist, playwright, translator and critic,diaspora writer and scholar.
- Alokeranjan Dasgupta, Bengali poet who was the author of over 20 books of poetry. He translated Bengali and Santal poetry and plays into English and German, and also translated literature from German and French into Bengali.
- Sukumar Ray, Bengali writer and poet from British India. He is remembered mainly for his writings for children.
- Upendrakishore Ray Chowdhury, Bengali writer, painter and entrepreneur.
- Nabaneeta Dev Sen, Indian writer and academic.
- Jibanananda Das, often called the Rupashi Banglar Kabi (lit. Poet of Beautiful Bengal), he was an Indian poet, writer, novelist and essayist in the Bengali language.
- Dinabandhu Mitra, Bengali-language writer and dramatist, notable for his play 'Nil Darpan' based on the atrocities inflicted by the British Indigo planters on the farmers of Bengal.
- Nabinchandra Sen, poet and writer, often considered one of the greatest poets prior to the arrival of Rabindranath Tagore.
- Dwijendralal Ray, Indian Bengali poet, playwright, and musician
- Upendrakishore Ray Chowdhury, writer, painter and entrepreneur. Did not complete his studies from Presidency College

== Musician ==
- Pritam, Music Director
