= David Arnold (historian) =

British historian

David Arnold (born 1 October 1946) is a British historian and academic who specializes in the history of modern South Asia, with a particular interest in colonialism, science and medicine, environmental history, technology, and the history of disease. He is currently Professor Emeritus of History at the University of Warwick, having previously been Professor of South Asian History at the School of Oriental and African Studies (SOAS), University of London.

== Early life and education ==
Arnold was born in London on 1 October 1946. He attended the Coopers’ Company’s School before studying history at the University of Exeter, where he graduated with a first-class BA Honours degree in 1968. He subsequently held a Commonwealth Scholarship at the University of Madras from 1968 to 1970 and, having worked under the supervision of Professor D. A. Low, received a DPhil from the University of Sussex in 1973.

== Academic career ==
Arnold began his academic career as a lecturer in the Department of History at the University of Dar es Salaam in Tanzania from 1972 to 1975. He was then a Social Science Research Fellow at Flinders University in South Australia from 1975 to 1977 and a Research Fellow at the School of Oriental and African Studies, University of London, from 1977 to 1978.

From 1979 to 1988, Arnold held a lectureship in the Department of History at the University of Lancaster. In 1988 he joined SOAS as Professor of South Asian History, a position he held until 2006. At SOAS, Arnold served as Head of the History Department from 1992 to 1996 and Pro-Director for Research from 1999 to 2002. He was appointed Professor of Asian and Global History at the University of Warwick in 2006 and remained at Warwick until 2011, when he retired as a professor emeritus.

== Research ==
Arnold’s research has primarily addressed the political, scientific, and environmental history of India under British rule, especially through the changing relationship between society, state, science, medicine, and technology. His early research focused on nationalism and political organization in South India, and then on colonial policing. His later work has examined various subjects including epidemic disease, environmental change, “everyday technology,” poisoning, and pandemics. His most recent research has explored the remaking of India’s cattle under colonial rule.

His best-known book, Colonizing the Body: State Medicine and Epidemic Disease in Nineteenth-Century India (1993), explored the development of state medicine and responses to epidemic disease in colonial India. Among other widely cited works, The Problem of Nature: Environment, Culture and the Expansion of Europe (1996) examined changing European conceptions of nature and the emergence of ideas of “tropicality” in relation to imperial expansion. Science, Technology and Medicine in Colonial India (2000) provided an overview of the development of scientific, technological, and medical ideas and practices in colonial India. Arnold also published a study of Gandhi’s career and political leadership in 2001 and in 1984 an essay on the Italian Marxist Antonio Gramsci and his views of the peasantry as applied to India.

Arnold’s subsequent work has investigated travel, landscape and scientific observation in nineteenth-century India in The Tropics and the Traveling Gaze: India, Landscape, and Science, 1800–1856 (2005). His wide-ranging research on technology and modernity led to Everyday Technology: Machines and the Making of India’s Modernity (2013), while Toxic Histories: Poison and Pollution in Modern India (2016) examined the historical development of pollution and toxicity in India.

His more recent publications include Burning the Dead: Hindu Nationhood and the Global Construction of Indian Tradition (2021), a historical study of cremation practices in India, and Pandemic India: From Cholera to Covid-19 (2022), which traces the history of epidemic disease in India and the representation of India from the early nineteenth century to the COVID-19 pandemic.

In a series of book chapters and scholarly articles, Arnold has also written about poor Europeans, crime and popular protest, botany and agriculture, food and famine, colonial policing and penology, photography and visual culture, and, latterly, cattle.

Arnold was a founder member of the Subaltern Studies collective of historians, contributing essays to five of the published volumes of Subaltern Studies and with David Hardiman he edited a collection of essays honoring Ranajit Guha in 1994. Arnold was a founder of the British Association for South Asian Studies and served as its secretary from 1986 to 1992. He was a member of several British Academy committees and chaired its South Asia Area Studies Panel from 2010 to 2014. He also served on assessment and commissioning panels for the Arts and Humanities Research Council. Support for his research came from several sources including the Wellcome Trust, the British Academy, the Nuffield Foundation, the Leverhulme Trust, and the Arts and Humanities Research Council.

== Selected publications ==
Books

- The Congress in Tamilnad: Nationalist Politics in South India, 1919–1937 (1977)
- The Age of Discovery, 1400–1600 (1983)
- Police Power and Colonial Rule: Madras, 1859–1947 (1986)
- Famine: Social Crisis and Historical Change (1988)
- Colonizing the Body: State Medicine and Epidemic Disease in Nineteenth-Century India (1993)
- The Problem of Nature: Environment, Culture and the Expansion of Europe (1996)
- Science, Technology and Medicine in Colonial India (2000)
- Gandhi (2001)
- The Tropics and the Traveling Gaze: India, Landscape, and Science, 1800–1856 (2005)
- Südasien (2012)
- Everyday Technology: Machines and the Making of India’s Modernity (2013)
- Toxic Histories: Poison and Pollution in Modern India (2016)
- Burning the Dead: Hindu Nationhood and the Global Construction of Indian Tradition (2021)
- Pandemic India: From Cholera to Covid-19 (2022)

Arnold has edited or co-edited several collections of essays, including Imperial Medicine and Indigenous Societies (1988), Nature, Culture, Imperialism: Essays on the Environmental History of South Asia (1995), Warm Climates and Western Medicine: The Emergence of Tropical Medicine, 1500–1900 (1996), and Telling Lives in India: Biography, Autobiography, and Life History (2004).

== Honours ==
Arnold was elected a Fellow of the British Academy in 2004 becoming an emeritus fellow in 2018. He was George Lurcy Distinguished Visiting Professor at the University of Chicago in 2008 and a visiting professor at ETH Zürich in 2013.

== See also ==
- Science and technology studies in India
