= Ileana Rodríguez =

Nicaraguan academic

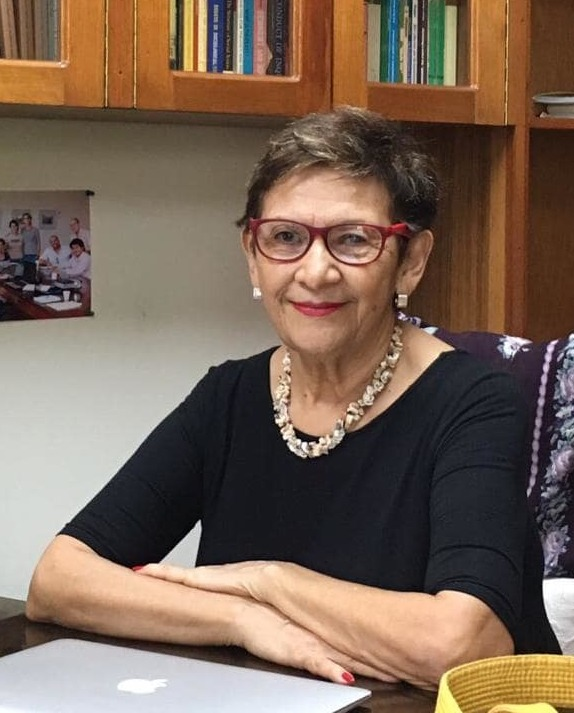
Ileana Rodríguez in 2017

Ileana Rodríguez (born October 8, 1939 in Chinandega, Nicaragua) is Distinguished Professor Emeritus in Latin American Literatures and Cultures at the Ohio State University, and she is also affiliated with the Instituto de Historia de Nicaragua y Centroamérica (IHNCA).

Rodríguez obtained a B.A. in Philosophy from the Universidad Nacional Autónoma de México in 1963, and a second B.A. in Philosophy from the University of California, San Diego in 1970. She obtained a Ph.D. in Spanish Literature from the University of California, San Diego in 1976.

Her areas of research fall within Latin American literatures and cultures, more precisely post-colonial theory and feminist and subaltern studies, with a focus on literatures from Central America and the Caribbean. The aim of her work is to comment on gender and ethnicity and reveal how language reflects the state of politics and society in Latin America.

== Early life ==
At the age of five, she migrated with her mother to Mexico City. She studied her elementary and high schools at public institutions, and in 1959 entered the Mexican National University where she studied the first two years of college before coming to study at the University of California, San Diego.

== Academic career ==
Rodríguez obtained a B.A. in Philosophy from the University of California, San Diego in 1970, and a Ph.D. in Spanish Literature from the same university in 1976. She studied under the direction of Carlos Blanco Aguinaga.

Her first post as Assistant Professor was at the University of Minnesota, Twin Cities, where she obtained her tenure, but she has also worked at the University of Maryland, College Park, University of Oregon at Eugene, University of Michigan, East Lansing, and Harvard. After her tenure she travelled to Nicaragua after the victory of the Sandinista Revolution and she worked at the Ministry of Culture under the direction of Ernesto Cardenal and taught at the Universidad Nacional Autónoma de Managua. She was the National Librarian and she is also affiliated with the Instituto de Historia de Nicaragua y Centroamérica (IHNCA).

== Academic Appointments ==
- Academic director of the Maestría en Estudios Culturales. Instituto de Historia de Nicaragua y Centroamérica (IHNCA), Universidad Centroamericana, Managua, Nicaragua 2014–2015.
- Michigan State University; Visiting Professor (Fall).
- Department of Romance Languages. Harvard University, 2005; Visiting Professor (Spring).
- Department of Romance Languages. Michigan State University, 2003; Visiting Associate Professor (Fall).
- Department of Romance Languages. University of Oregon. Eugene, OR 1997; Visiting Associate Professor (Summer).
- Literature Department, University of California, San Diego, La Jolla. CA, 1997.
- Literature Department, University of California, San Diego. La Jolla, CA, 1989; Visiting Professor.
- Universidad Nacional Autónoma de Managua, Nicaragua, 1983–85; Associate Professor.
- Department of Spanish and Portuguese, University of Minnesota. Minneapolis, MN, 1980–85; Visiting Assistant Professor (Winter).

== University politics ==
Latin American and Subaltern Studies; Studies of women, gender, sexuality; revolutions and transitions. Her areas of research fall within Latin American literatures and cultures, more precisely post-colonial theory and feminist and subaltern studies, with a focus on literatures from Central America and the Caribbean. The aim of her work is to comment on gender and ethnicity and reveal how language reflects the state of politics and society in Latin America.

== Bibliography ==
- Modalidades de memoria y archivos afectivos: Cine de mujeres en Centroamérica. (San José: Universidad de Costa Rica. CALAS. Maria Sibylla Merian Center, 2020
- La Prosa de la Contrainsurgencia. Naturaleza de ‘lo político’: ‘Lo Político’ durante la Restauración Neo-Liberal en Nicaragua. (North Carolina, Contracorriente, 2019
- Gender Violence in Failed and Democratic States: Besieging Perverse Masculinities. Palgrave McMillan, 2016
- The Cambridge History of Latin American Women's Literature. With Mónica Szurmuk. Cambridge UP, 2016;
- Imaginario Criollo, Estudios Transatlánticos Postcoloniales. Vol.III. With Josebe Martínez. Barcelona: Anthropos, 2013; Estudios Transatlánticos Postcoloniales.
- ol. II Mito, archivo, disciplina: cartografías culturales. With Josebe Martínez. Barcelona: Anthropos, 2011;
- Hombres de empresa, saber y poder en Centroamérica: Identidades regionales/Modernidades periféricas. Managua: IHNCA, 2011.
- Debates Culturales y Agendas de Campo: Estudios Culturales, Postcoloniales, Subalternos, Transatlánticos, Transoceánicos. Santiago de Chile: Cuarto Propio, 2011.
- Estudios Transatlánticos: Narrativas Comando/Sistemas Mundos: Colonialidad/Modernidad. (Editor, with Josebe Martínez). Barcelona: Anthropos, 2010.
- Liberalism at its Limits: Crime and Terror in the Latin American Cultural Text. Pittsburgh: University of Pittsburgh Press, 2009.
- Transatlantic Topographies: Island, Highlands, Jungle. Minneapolis y Londres: University of Minnesota Press, 2005.
- Convergencia de tiempos: Estudios Subalternos/Contextos Latinoamericanos—Estado, Cultura, Subalternidad. (Editor). Amsterdam: Rodopi, 2001.
- Latin American Subaltern Studies Reader. (Editor). Durham: Duke University Press, 2001.
- Cánones literarios masculinos y relecturas transculturales. Lo transfemenino/masculino/queer. (Editor). Barcelona: Anthropos, 2001.
- Women Guerrillas, and Love: Understanding War in Central America. Minneapolis y Londres: University of Minnesota Press, 1996.
- House/Garden/Nation: Space, Gender, and Ethnicity in Post-Colonia Latin American Literatures by Women. Durham y Londres: Duke University Press, 1994.
- Registradas en la historia: 10 años del quehacer feminista en Nicaragua. Managua: Editorial Vanguardia, 1990.
- Primer inventario del invasor. Managua: Editorial Nueva Nicaragua, 1984.
- Process of Unity in Caribbean Society: Ideologies and Literature. (Editor, with Marc Zimmerman). Minneapolis: Institute for the Study of Ideologies and Literature, 1983.
- Nicaragua in Revolution: The Poets Speak./Nicaragua en Revolución: Los poetas hablan. (Editor, with Bridget Aldaraca, Edward Baker y Marc Zimmerman). 2nd ed. Minneapolis: Marxist Educational Press, 1981.
- Marxism and New Left Ideology. (Editor, with William L. Rowe). Studies in Marxism. Minneapolis: Marxist Educational Press, 1977.
