= Partha Chatterjee =

Partha Chatterjee may refer to:

- Partha Chatterjee (scholar) (born 1947), Indian scholar of political science, anthropology and history.
- Partha Chatterjee (politician), Indian politician from West Bengal.
