= Walter King =

Walter King may refer to:

- Walter Woolf King (1899–1984), American actor and singer
- Walter Gawen King (1851–1935), British Indian army surgeon
- King Fleming (Walter "King" Fleming, 1922–2014), American musician
- Walter King Stapleton (born 1934), United States federal judge
- Walter King Venning (1882–1964), British Army general
- Walter K. Wilson Jr. (Walter King Wilson, Jr., 1906–1985), U.S. Army general
- Walter K. Wilson Sr. (Walter King Wilson Sr., 1880–1954), US Army general
- Gilbert Walter King (1871–1937), British judge who served in China
