= David Hardiman =

Pakistani-English historian of modern India

David Hardiman is a historian of modern India and a founding member of the subaltern studies group. Born in Rawalpindi in Pakistan, Hardiman was brought up in England where he graduated from the London School of Economics in 1970 and received his D.Phil. in South Asian History from the University of Sussex in 1975. He is an Emeritus professor of the Department of History at the University of Warwick.

== Selected publications ==
- Noncooperation in India: Nonviolent Strategy and Protest 1920-22, Hurst, London 2020.
- The Nonviolent Struggle for Indian Freedom 1905–19, Hurst, London 2018.
- Medical Marginality in South Asia: Situating Subaltern Therapeutics, (edited with Projit Mukharji ), Routledge, 2012. ISBN 978-0-415-50241-2
- Missionaries and their Medicine: A Christian Modernity for Tribal India, Manchester University press, Manchester, 2008. ISBN 978-0-7190-9539-9
- Gandhi in his Time and Ours, Permanent Black, New Delhi, 2003; Hurst, London, Columbia University Press, New York and Natal University Press, Durban, 2004. ISBN 8178240548 / ISBN 9788178240541
- Peasant Resistance in India (edited collection with long introductory essay by D.H.), Oxford University Press, New Delhi 1992 (paperback edition 1994). ISBN 0195633903 / ISBN 978-0195633900
- Subaltern Studies VIII: Essays in Honour of Ranajit Guha (edited with David Arnold), Oxford University Press, New Delhi 1994 (paperback editions 1996, 1997, 1999). ISBN 0195637216 / ISBN 978-0195637212
