= C. Christine Fair =

American political scientist and professor

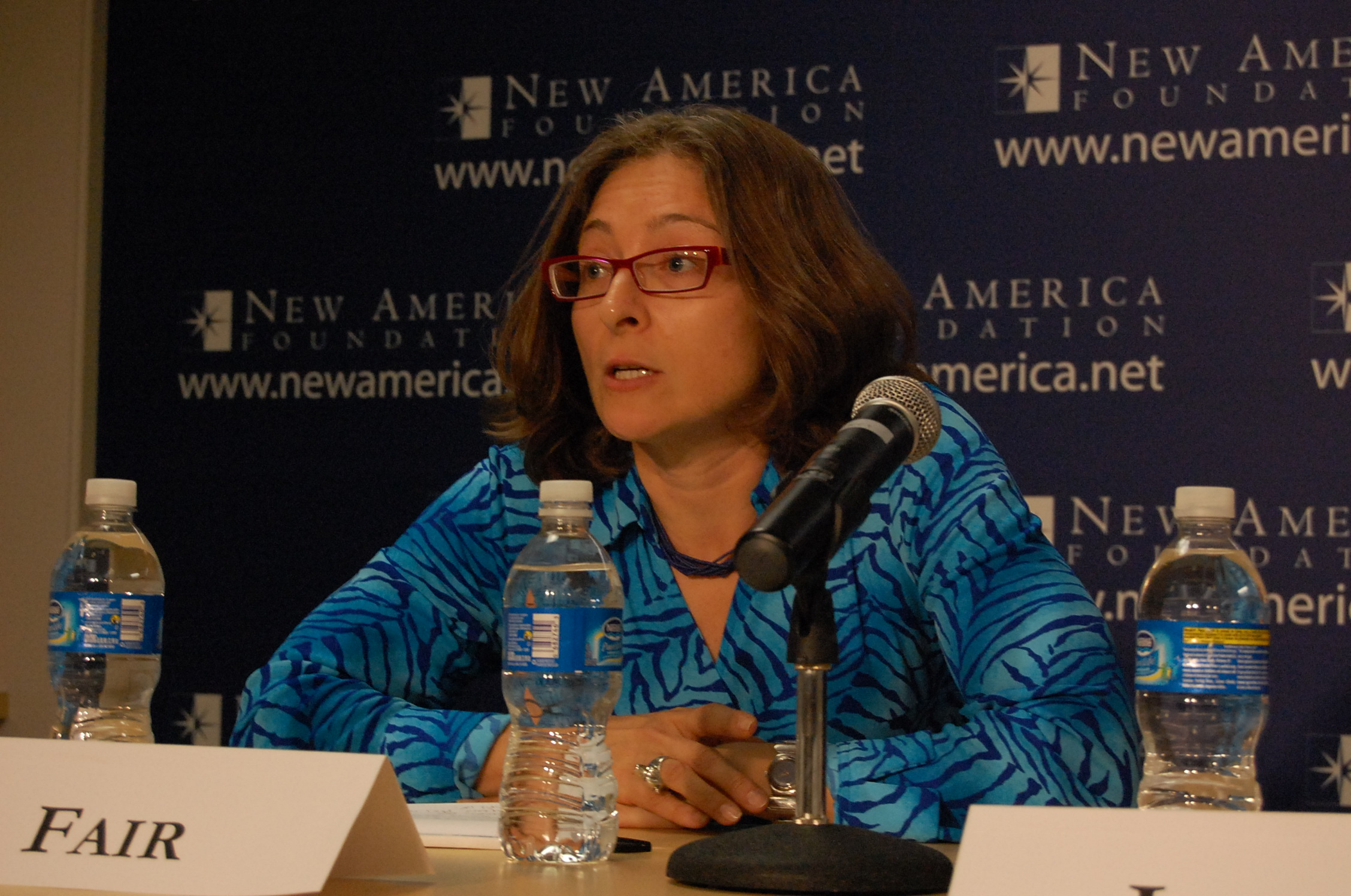
- C. Christine Fair at New America event "Afghanistan Eight Years On" in 2009
- Born: Carol Christine Fair; 1968 (age 57–58)

Academic background
- Education: University of Chicago (PhD, MA, BS)

Academic work
- Institutions: Georgetown University

Carol Christine Fair (born 1968) is an American political scientist. She is a professor in the Security Studies Program within the Edmund A. Walsh School of Foreign Service at Georgetown University. Her work is primarily focused on counter-terrorism and South Asian topics.

== Academic career ==
Fair received her PhD from the Department of South Asian Languages and Civilization at the University of Chicago in 2004. Previously, she received a masters of arts and Bachelor of Science from the same university.

Fair served as a senior political scientist with the RAND Corporation, political officer with the UN Assistance Mission to Afghanistan, and a senior research associate with the United States Institute of Peace. She specializes in political and military affairs in South Asia. She has served as a senior fellow at West Point's Combating Terrorism Center, a senior resident fellow at the Institute of Defense Studies and Analyses (New Delhi), and took a Reagan–Fascell Democracy Fellowship in the spring of 2017.

== Academic controversies ==
Fair's work and viewpoints have been the subject of criticism. In 2015, journalist Glenn Greenwald dismissed Fair's arguments in support of drone strikes as "rank propaganda", arguing there are "enormous amounts of evidence" showing drones are counterproductive, pointing to mass civilian casualties and independent studies. Commenting on her debate with Greenwald, Brookings Institution senior fellow Shadi Hamid called Fair's arguments "surprisingly weak". In 2010, Fair denied the notion that drones caused any civilian deaths, alleging Pakistani media reports were responsible for creating this perception. Jeremy Scahill wrote that Fair's statement was "simply false" and contradicted by New America's detailed study on drone casualties. Fair later said that casualties are caused by the UAVs, but maintains they are the most effective tool for fighting terrorism.

Writing for The Atlantic, Conor Friedersdorf challenged Fair's co-authored narrative that the U.S. could legitimize support in Pakistan for its drone program using 'education' and 'public diplomacy'; he called it an "example of interventionist hubris and naivete" built upon flawed interpretation of public opinion data. An article in the Middle East Research and Information Project called the work "some of the most propagandistic writing in support of President Barack Obama’s targeted kill lists to date." It censured the view that Pakistanis needed to be informed by the U.S. what is "good for them" as fraught with imperialist condescension; or the assumption that the Urdu press was less informed than the English press – because the latter was sometimes less critical of the U.S.

Fair's journalistic sources have been questioned for their credibility and she has been accused of having a conflict of interest due to her past work with U.S. government think tanks, as well as the CIA. In 2011 and 2012, she received funding from the U.S. embassy in Islamabad to conduct a survey on public opinion concerning militancy. However, Fair states most of the grants went to a survey firm and that it had no influence on her research. Pakistani media analysts have dismissed Fair's views as hawkish rhetoric, riddled with factual inaccuracies, lack of objectivity, and being selectively biased. She has been accused by the Pakistani government of double standards, partisanship towards India, and has been criticized for her contacts with dissident leaders from Balochistan, a link which they claim "raises serious questions if her interest in Pakistan is merely academic."

== Personal controversies ==
In January 2017, Fair was involved in a Twitter dispute with Asra Q. Nomani. In response to Nomani's tweet that as a Muslim, she voted for President Trump, Fair tweeted that she had "written [Nomani] off as a human being" and that Nomani had "pimped herself out to all media outlets." Nomani responded by filing a complaint with Georgetown University, Fair's employer, alleging discrimination and harassment.

In May 2017, Fair began an altercation with white nationalist Richard B. Spencer at a gym in Alexandria, Virginia. While the two were working out, Fair approached Spencer and accused him of being a Nazi, along with a number of other accusations, leading a third gym patron to intervene on his behalf while "apparently unaware of who he was". This incident resulted in Spencer's membership being terminated by the manager of the gym.

In January 2018, Fair was involved in an incident at Frankfurt Airport in Germany. When her bag was flagged for possibly containing explosives, it was searched and German Federal Police instructed Fair that she would have to dispose of a liquid deodorant or transfer it to her checked bag. German police stated that Fair was uncooperative, that she accused them of sexism and of being Nazis and thugs, and directed expletives at them. Fair was charged with slander under Germany's defamation law. She subsequently published an article on HuffPost partially rejecting the police account of the incident.

In the midst of the Brett Kavanaugh Supreme Court nomination hearings in September 2018, Fair tweeted that Republican members of the Senate Judiciary Committee were "entitled white men justifying a serial rapists' arrogated entitlement" and that they "deserve miserable deaths while feminists laugh as they take their last gasps." She made additional comments expressing support for post-mortem castration and corpse desecration of the senators. At least one student expressed the fear that Fair's comments would cause students who hold opposing views to feel threatened. Georgetown University responded by saying that her expressions did not violate the university's policies. The university later responded by moving up her scheduled international research leave.

Fair has accused the historian Dipesh Chakrabarty of sexual harassment. Following a legal defamation suit, Fair issued a public apology for several allegations against Chakrabarty and his wife. Fair also charged historian Rochona Majumdar for sexual exploitation and plagiarism. Upon being sued and subsequent defeat in the lawsuit, Fair issued an unconditional public apology for the vilification and retracted her statements.

== Works ==
Books

- Cuisines of the Axis of Evil and Other Irritating States: A Dinner Party Approach to International Relations (The Lyons Press, 2008). ISBN 978-1599212869.
- Fighting to the End: The Pakistan Army's Way of War (Oxford University Press, 2014). ISBN 978-0-19-989271-6.
- In Their Own Words: Understanding Lashkar-e-Tayyaba (Oxford University Press, 2019).

Edited collections

- Treading on Hallowed Ground: Counterinsurgency Operations in Sacred Spaces (with Sumit Ganguly, Oxford University Press, 2008). ISBN 978-0-19-971189-5.
- Islam and Governance in Bangladesh (with Ali Riaz, Routledge, 2010). ISBN 978-1-136-92623-5.
- Pakistan in National and Regional Change: State and Society in Flux (with Shaun Gregory, Routledge, 2013). ISBN 978-0-415-83134-5.
