= Sekhar Bandyopadhyay =

Indian historian

- শেখর বন্দ্যোপাধ্যায়
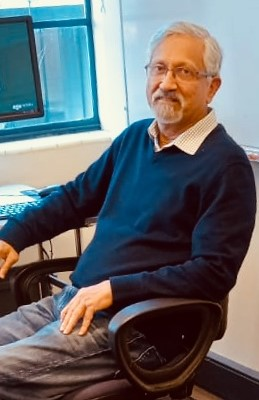
- Born: 7 July 1952 (age 74); Chunchura, West Bengal, India
- Awards: Rabindra Puraskar Rabindranath Tagore Memorial Prize

Academic background
- Education: Presidency College; University of Calcutta

Academic work
- Discipline: History
- Sub-discipline: Caste system in India, Bengal, nationalism, postcolonialism, Indian diaspora

Sekhar Bandyopadhyay (born 7 July 1952) is an Indian historian and a Fellow of the Royal Society Te Apārangi. Bandyopadhyay is known for his research on the Dalit caste of Bengal.

== Life ==
Bandyopadhyay was born to Nanigopal Bandyopadhyay, a professor of Bengali and Pratima Bandyopadhyay. Bandyopadhyay earned his B.A. degree in History at Presidency College and an M.A. degree at the University of Calcutta. He was awarded a doctorate at the University of Calcutta. His doctoral advisor was Professor Amales Tripathi.He is married to Srilekha Bandyopadhyay and lives in Wellington with his wife.

== Career ==
Bandyopadhyay is Emeritus Professor at Victoria University of Wellington and was the founding director of the New Zealand India Research Institute. He has also taught at the Ramakrishna Mission Residential College, Narendrapur, University of Kalyani, and the University of Calcutta. Bandyopadhyay was the first recipient of the Charles Wallace Postdoctoral Fellowship at the Centre for South Asian Studies, SOAS University of London. He has also held visiting fellowships at the University of Chicago, National University of Singapore, International Institute for Asian Studies, Curtin University, Australian National University and Rabindra Bharati University. From 2009 to 2010, Bandyopadhyay served as the President of the New Zealand Asian Studies Society and currently co-edits its journal, the New Zealand Journal of Asian Studies. In 2009, Bandyopadhyay was awarded the Rabindra Smriti Puraskar (Rabindranath Tagore Memorial Prize), given by the Government of West Bengal, for his monograph Decolonisation in South Asia: Meanings of Freedom in Post-Independence Bengal 1947-52. Bandyopadhyay has been a recipient of a Marsden grant of the Royal Society of New Zealand.

Since 2021, the Sekhar Bandyopadhyay Prize has been awarded annually by the Department of History at Victoria University of Wellington to the student submitting the best essay or thesis on an aspect of Indian history or the history of colonialism or nationalism. The award 'acknowledges and celebrates the distinguished career of Professor Sekhar Bandyopadhyay, Professor of History at Victoria University of Wellington'.

== Awards ==
- Rabindra Puraskar (Rabindranath Tagore Memorial Prize)
- Fellow, Royal Society Te Apārangi
- Inaugural Fellow, New Zealand Academy of Humanities

== Select works ==
=== Monographs ===
- Burma To-day: Economic Development and Political Control since 1962 (1987)
- Caste, Politics and the Raj: Bengal 1872–1937 (1990)
- Caste, Protest and Identity in Colonial India: The Namasudras of Bengal, 1872–1947 (1997; Second Edition 2011)
- Caste, Culture and Hegemony: Social Dominance in Colonial Bengal (2004)
- From Plassey to Partition and After: A History of Modern India (2004; Second Revised and Enlarged Edition 2015)
- Decolonization in South Asia: Meanings of Freedom in Post-independence West Bengal, 1947–52 (2009/2012)
- Caste and Partition in Bengal: The Story of Dalit Refugees, 1946–1961 (2022, With Anasua Basu Raychaudhury)

=== Edited collections ===
- Bengal: Rethinking History. Essays in Historiography (2001)
- Nationalist Movement in India: A Reader (2009)
- India in New Zealand: Local Identities, Global Relations (2010)
- Decolonization and Politics of Transition in South Asia (2016)

=== Co-edited collections ===
- Caste and Communal Politics in South Asia (1993, with Suranjan Das)
- Bengal: Communities, Development and States (1994, with Abhijit Dasgupta and William Van Schendel)
- People of India: West Bengal, 2 volumes (2008, with T. Bagchi and R.K. Bhattacharya)
- China, India and the End of Development Models (2011, with X. Huang and A.C. Tan)
- Globalization and Challenges of Development in Contemporary India (2016, with Sita Venkateshwar)
- Religion and Modernity in India (2016, with Aloka Parashar Sen)
- Calcutta: The Stormy Decades (2015, with Tanika Sarkar)
- Indians and the Antipodes: Networks, Boundaries and Circulation (2018, with Jane Buckingham)
- Caste in Bengal: Histories of Hierarchy, Exclusion and Resistance (2022, with Tanika Sarkar)

=== Books in Bengali ===
- Ashtadas Sataker Mughal Sankat O Adhunik Itihas Chinta [Eighteenth-Century Mughal Crisis and Modern Historical Thinking] (1995)
- Jati, Varna O Bangali Samaj [Caste, Varna and Bengali Society] (1998, co-edited with Abhijit Dasgupta)

=== Journal articles ===
- "Caste, Nation and Modernity: Indian Nationalism's Unresolved Dilemma" [A.R. Davis Memorial Lecture, Sydney, 2016], The Journal of the Oriental Society of Australia, 48 (2016), pp. 5–24.
- "India-New Zealand Relations in the New Century: A Historical Narrative of Changing Perceptions and Shifting Priorities", India Quarterly, 69(4) (2013), pp. 317–333.
- "Rabindranath Tagore, Indian Nation and Its Outcasts", Harvard Asia Quarterly, 15 (1) (Spring 2013), pp. 28–33.
- "Partition and the Ruptures in Dalit Identity Politics in Bengal", Asian Studies Review, 33 (4) (2009), pp. 455–467.
- "A History of Small Numbers: Indians in New Zealand, c.1890s–1990s", New Zealand Journal of History, 43 (2) (2009), pp. 150–168.
- "Freedom and its Enemies: Politics of Transition in West Bengal, 1947–1949", South Asia: Journal of South Asian Studies, XXIX (1) (April 2006), pp. 43–68.
- "Transfer of Power and the Crisis of Dalit Politics in India, 1945-47", Modern Asian Studies, 34 (4) (2000), pp. 893–942.
- "Protest and Accommodation: Two Caste Movements in Eastern and Northern Bengal, c1872–1937", The Indian Historical Review, XIV (1–2) (1990), pp. 219–33.
- "Caste in the Perception of the Raj: A Note on the Evolution of Colonial Sociology of Bengal", Bengal Past and Present, CIV, Parts I–II (198–199) (January–December 1985), pp. 56–80.
- "Caste, Class and Census: Aspects of Social Mobility in Bengal under the Raj, 1872-1931", The Calcutta Historical Journal, V (2) (January–June 1981), pp. 93–128.

=== Book chapters ===
- "Caste and Politics in Bengal: Late Nineteenth and Early Twentieth Century", in Sabyasachi Bhattacharya (Ed.) Comprehensive History of Modern Bengal 1700–1950, Volume III, Kolkata: Asiatic Society of Bengal, 2019, pp. 338–386.
- "Indian Unity and the Caste Question: Nationalist Readings of History" in S. Bhattacharya (Ed.) Rethinking the Cultural Unity of India, Kolkata: Ramakrishna Mission Institute of Culture, 2015, pp. 324–354.
- "Does Caste Matter in Bengal? Examining the Myth of Bengali Exceptionalism", in M.N. Chakraborty (Ed.) Being Bengali: At home and in the World, London and New York: Routledge, 2014, pp. 32–47.
- "Caste, Class and Culture in Colonial India", in S. Z. H. Zafri (Ed.) Recording the Progress of Indian History: Symposia Papers of the Indian History Congress 1992–2010, Delhi: Primus Books, 2012, pp. 225–239.
- "The Minorities in Post-Partition West Bengal: The Riots of 1950" in Abhijit Dasgupta et.al (Eds.) Minorities and the State: Changing Social and Political Landscape of Bengal, New Delhi, Sage Publications, 2011, pp. 3–17.
- "Caste, Widow-Remarriage, and the Reform of Popular Culture in Colonial Bengal", in Sumit Sarkar and Tanika Sarkar (Eds.) Women and Social Reform in Modern India: A Reader, Volume II, Bloomington: Indiana University Press, 2007, pp. 100–117.
- "Eighteen-Fifty-Seven and Its Many Histories", in 1857: Essays from Economic and Political Weekly, Hyderabad: Orient Longman, 2007, pp. 1–22.
- "From Subjects to Citizens: Reactions to Colonial Rule and the Changing Political Culture of Calcutta in the mid-nineteenth century", in Michael Wilding and Mabel Lee (eds.) Society and Culture: Essays in Honour of S.N. Mukherjee, New Delhi: Manohar Publishers and Distributors, 1997, pp. 9–31.
- "Popular Religion and Social Mobility in Colonial Bengal: The Matua Sect and the Namasudras", in Rajat K. Ray (Ed.) Mind, Body and Society: Life and Mentality in Colonial Bengal, Calcutta: Oxford University Press, 1995, pp. 152–192.
