= Perilous Passage =

Book by Amiya Kumar Bagchi

Perilous Passage: Mankind and the Global Ascendancy of Capital
- Author: Amiya Kumar Bagchi
- Genre: Economics
- Publication date: 2005

Perilous Passage: Mankind and the Global Ascendancy of Capital is a 2005 book by Amiya Kumar Bagchi. Bagchi explores the degree to which economic growth under capitalism is poorly correlated with human development. One reviewer said:

Bagchi analyzes this capitalist world not in terms of how much growth it made possible but how much human development it made possible, and in this regard he finds it very wanting. One of his principal services to readers is his pulling together of the demographic literature on life expectancy, the public health literature on disease prevention and cure, data on nutrition, income levels, and the various forms of labor coercion to give us a nuanced picture of human development over time and throughout the world, one that is differentiated by geography, age cohorts, and gender.
