= Brahma Prakash =

Indian writer

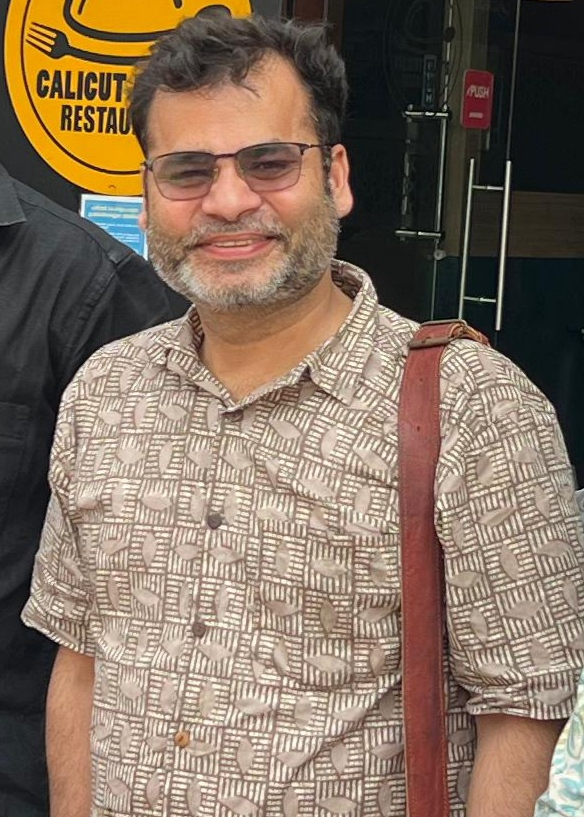
- In September 2024
- Occupations: Cultural theorist, writer, essayist, academician

Academic background
- Education: MA, PhD

Academic work
- Discipline: Arts, Culture and Aesthetics
- Institutions: Jawaharlal Nehru University, Delhi
- Notable works: Cultural Labour; Body on the Barricades
- Website: jnu.ac.in/content/bprakash

Brahma Prakash is an Indian cultural theorist, writer and academician who teaches theatre and performance studies at the School of Arts and Aesthetics, Jawaharlal Nehru University, New Delhi, India. He writes on art, culture and politics. He works on theatre and performance theories, rites, rituals and festivals, oral histories and narrative traditions, political performances, and cultural enactments.

== Education ==
Brahma Prakash completed his Ph.D. in Theatre and Performance Studies from Royal Holloway, University of London in 2014.

== Work and reception ==
Brahma Prakash is an assistant professor of theatre and performance studies at Jawaharlal Nehru University in New Delhi.

His writings have been reviewed and critically acclaimed in both popular and academic circles. While his book, Cultural Labour, has been seen as a new approach in the field of folk culture and performance studies. His book Bodies on the Barricades: Life, Art, and Resistance in Contemporary India (2023) has been mentioned by many authors. It has received positive reviews from readers, with Arundhati Roy calling it "a practical and unusual guidebook". Santosh Das considers the book a "work of passion" and a call to "get angry." According to Nivedita Menon, it has been described as a "lyrical and poignant witness to one of the darkest, but most inspiring moments in India's history."

He has worked on subaltern figures and artists such as Phoolan Devi, Telugu Balladeer Gaddar, and Bhikhari Thakur.

=== Folk performances in India ===
The book "Cultural Labour: Conceptualizing the 'Folk Performance' in India" by Brahma Prakash examines the relationship between culture and labour through the lens of folk performances in India. It explores how rituals, theatre, and enactments create meanings and behaviors within communities. Brahma Prakash provides a conceptual framework for understanding the politics and aesthetics of folk performance, drawing on extensive ethnography and his personal experiences.

=== Art and resistance ===
In his work, "Body on the Barricades Life, Art and Resistance in Contemporary India." Brahma Prakash explores the profound connection between art and resistance. He views art as a powerful medium for expressing dissent and challenging oppressive systems. Through his analysis of various forms of cultural and political resistance, Prakash highlighted how art serves as a means for marginalized communities to establish their identities, voice their struggles, and resist authoritarian forces. His insights emphasize the transformative potential of art in fostering social justice and creating spaces for resistance and solidarity.

=== The Epical subalterns ===
Brahma Prakash uses the term "Epical Subalterns" in his work titled "The Epical Subalterns: Imagining the ‘Impossible’ in India and South Asia." to describe the imaginative and performative practices of subaltern communities in India. These communities create epics and narratives that reflect their moral conquests over oppressive values, playing vital roles in their everyday struggles and resistance against injustices.

=== Columns ===
He has been writing columns on art and culture occasionally appear in Outlook, Scroll, Indian Cultural Forum.the Wire,

=== Books ===
- Prakash. Brahma. Cultural Labour: Conceptualizing the 'Folk Performance' in India, 2019; Oxford University Press, New Delhi, ISBN 9780199095858
- Prakash, Brahma. Body on the Barricades: Life, Art and Resistance in Contemporary India,2023; LeftWord, ISBN 978-93-92018-10-7

=== Research papers and book chapters ===
- "Power, Performance, and the Limits of Contemporary Animism as a (De)colonial Perspective in Indian Caste Society, Caste: A Global Journal on Social Exclusion." published by Brandeish University, USA, 2024.
- "Musical unfreedom and the drummers’ dilemma: Cultural labour and the value of music in Indian Caste society, in Anna Morcom and Neelam Raina (eds), Labour, Livelihood and Creative Economies: South Asian Performers and Craftspeople," London: Routledge, 2024.
- Prakash, B. (2022). Who is Afraid of Mourning? Mourning as a site of solidarity in South Asia. Performance Research, 27(5), 35–44.
- A Writer's Radical Hope in the time of despair, In Special Issue, ART INDIA, March 2024.
- Prakash, B. (2022). The erotic power of the dancer: labour of the erotic and the bodies of the sensory in the Arkestra of North India. South Asian History and Culture, 14(2), 186–201.
- Gestures of Cultural Justice: Narrative Justice for Phoolan Devi in Epic Recounting. Economic and Political Weekly, Vol. 57, Issue 9 (2022), pp. 1–20.

== See also ==
- Cultural studies
- Performance Studies
- South Asian Studies
- Cultural Theorist
- Subaltern Studies
