= Latin American subaltern studies =

Latin American subaltern studies was a group founded in 1992 by John Beverley and Ileana Rodríguez. Inspired by the South Asian Subaltern Studies group, its aim was to apply a similar perspective to Latin American studies. It was one of the more important recent developments within Latin American cultural studies, though in the end the group folded owing to internal differences that were both scholarly and political.

The group's "Founding Statement" was published originally in the journal boundary 2, attacking "the limits of elite historiography in relation to the subaltern" (112). As Horacio Legras summarizes, the group "was largely preoccupied with the different forms in which elite practices disavowed the originality and independence of subaltern actions" (126).

The group's work resulted in a Reader, various journal special issues, and also influenced individual book projects of some of those who are among the most significant contributors to their field.

Among the group's members were:

- John Kraniauskas
- Walter Mignolo
- Alberto Moreiras
- Abdul-Karim Mustapha
- José Rabasa
- Josefina Saldana
- Javier Sanjinés
- Patricia Seed
- Gareth Williams

== See also ==
- Subaltern Studies
