= King Institute of Preventive Medicine and Research =

Indian research institute

Coordinates: 13°0′50″N 80°12′58″E

- Established: 7 November 1899
- Type: Research Institute
- Location: Chennai, Tamil Nadu
- Director: K. Kaveri
- Website: www.kipmr.org.in

King Institute of Preventive Medicine and Research is a medicine research institute located in Guindy, Chennai, India. It was established on 7 November 1899 with the aim of protecting against scourging infections and was named after Lt. Col. W. G. King, the then Sanitary Commissioner of the Madras Presidency.

The institute is located on the banks of Adyar River. The main red building that houses the Director's office has been identified as a heritage structure and has been brought under Indian Archaeological Society. The institute functions under Director of Medical Education and Department of Health and Family Welfare (Tamil Nadu).

It was one of the major institutions in India responsible for eradicating small pox by the production of vaccine. It is also one of the referral centers for bacterial and viral diseases in Tamil Nadu. Various wings at the institute include International Vaccination Centre, Board of Paramedical Education, and school of laboratory technology. Activities at the institute include quality control of schedule C and C1 drugs, manufacturing of anti–snake venom serum, diagnostic reagents (antigens and antisera), maintenance and supply of bacterial cultures, small animals, bacterial and virological diagnosis, and food sample testing.

The International vaccination centre in King Institute of Preventive Medicine and Research is one of the World Health Organization authorized centres for issuing yellow fever vaccination certificate.

== See also ==
- Heritage structures in Chennai
