= Walter Gawen King =

British Doctor in Colonial India

Colonel Walter Gawen King CIE (4 December 1851 – 4 April 1935) was a British Indian army surgeon who served in the Madras Presidency as a sanitary officer and introduced a number of public health measures for the first time in India. The King Institute of Preventive Medicine and Research in Chennai was named in his honour in 1905.

== Life ==
King was born in England, the son of J. H. King and Laura daughter of George William Marrett, engineer to the Nizam in Hyderabad. He studied medicine at the University of Aberdeen, receiving an MB and CM in 1873 and joined the Indian Medical Service in 1874. He served in the 31's and the 5th Burmah regiments and became a civil surgeon in 1877 at Madras. While posted here, he was a professor of hygiene at the Madras Medical College. During the famines of 1876-77 and 1896-97 in southern India, his services were recognized by the government. He served in Burma from 1906 to 1908. He was made CIE in 1899. He retired to England in 1910 with the rank of colonel and lived in Hendon where he died in 1935.

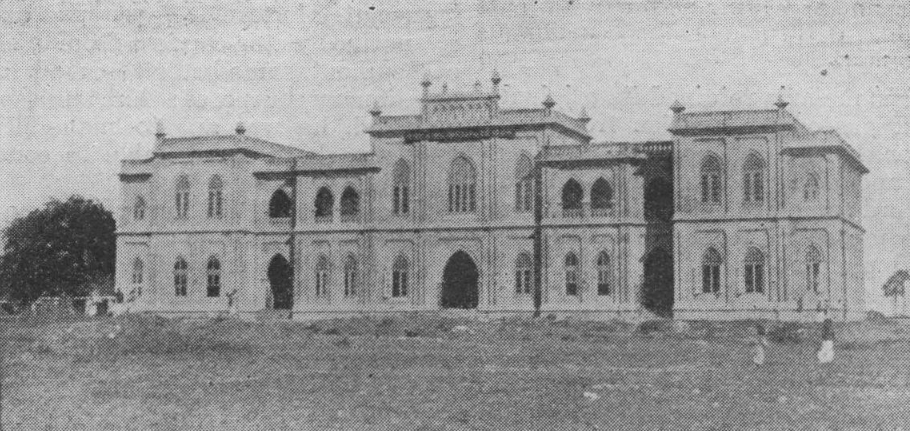
The King Institute c. 1914

King's major work was on vaccination and public health. He was involved in the introduction of rules to track movement of people during the plague outbreaks in Madras. He began research at Guindy in 1899 to produce vaccines which resulted in an institute that was formally named as the King Institute and opened on 11 March 1905.

== Vaccination and public health ==
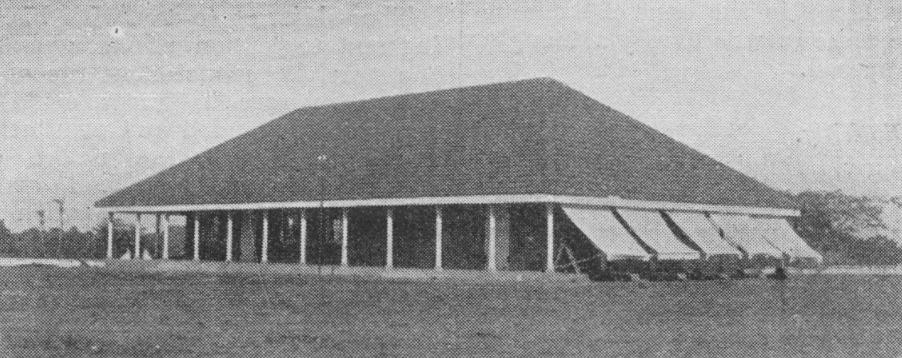
Vaccine production building at the King Institute c. 1914

King was appointed inspector of vaccination in 1890 and used lanolin and vaseline as a medium for storage of smallpox vaccine. In 1892 he became Sanitary Commissioner for Madras and served in this position until 1905. He established a department of public health and developed courses in public health and had sanitary inspectors trained at the Madras Medical College. The Madras Registration of Births and Deaths Act of 1899 was the result of a proposal from King.

== Plague management ==
In September 1896, the first case of plague in India was reported in Bombay. King immediately issued a circular to the medical officers of the port, warning them of its entrance to the Presidency and advised the local bodies in the Presidency to adopt plague passports, which would enable tracking movement of people from plague affected areas to other parts. In 1903 nearly 79500 plague passports were issued and tracked. He also produced management guidelines which included inspections of ships and transports.

== Promotion of soya ==
King recognised the nutritional value of soya beans and promoted their cultivation in India. In 1897 he provided seeds to officials in South India to introduce soya bean cultivation in India.

== Publications ==
King published numerous papers and also published annual reports on vaccination in the Madras Presidency for 1902-03, 1903-04.

- Cultivation of Animal Vaccine (1891)
- Plague Inspector's Manual (1902)
- Sanitary Rules for the Prevention of Plague in Municipalities (1903)
- Simple Sanitary Rules during Cholera Epidemics.
- King, W. G. (1912). "The prevention of plague in the Madras Presidency (Continued)". The Journal of State Medicine. 20 (4): 220–254. ISSN 2633-5468. JSTOR 45202903.
- KING, W. G. (1912). "The Prevention of Plague in the Madras Presidency". The Journal of State Medicine. 20 (2): 100–111. ISSN 2633-5468. JSTOR 45202896.
- King, W.-G. (1904). "Commonsense Policy of Plague". The Indian Medical Gazette. 39 (12): 447–450. ISSN 0019-5863. PMC 5162504. PMID 29003787.
- King, W. G.; Simpson, W. J. (1913). "Indian Sanitary Reforms". The Indian Medical Gazette. 48 (4): 163. ISSN 0019-5863. PMC 5177209. PMID 29005834.
- King, W. G. (1902-02-08). "Inoculation and the Incubation Stage of Plague". British Medical Journal. 1 (2145): 365. ISSN 0007-1447. PMC 2511965.
- King, W. G. (1900-12-15). ""Haffkinine."". British Medical Journal. 2 (2085): 1750–1751. ISSN 0007-1447. PMC 2464021.
- King, W. G. (1893). "Vaccine Lymph—Its Origin and Cultivation". The Indian Medical Gazette. 28 (3): 65–68. ISSN 0019-5863. PMC 5171965. PMID 29000968.
- King, W. G. (1896). "Extract from an Account of Experiments for the Preservation of Animal Lymph Conducted". The Indian Medical Gazette. 31 (12): 440–443. ISSN 0019-5863. PMC 5146175. PMID 29002659.
- King, W. G. (1922-02-18). "FATS AND GOITRE". British Medical Journal. 1 (3190): 287. ISSN 0007-1447. PMC 2415620.
- King, W. G. (1896). "The Preservation of Animal Lymph, Vaseline or Lanoline". The Indian Medical Gazette. 31 (12): 438–440. ISSN 0019-5863. PMC 5146173. PMID 29002657.
- King, W. G. (1893). "Animal Vaccine: Its Origin and Cultivation". The Indian Medical Gazette. 28 (7): 209–218. ISSN 0019-5863. PMC 5172071. PMID 29001031.
- King, W. G. (1898-06-25). ""Extraneous Organisms" in Preserved Vaccine". British Medical Journal. 1 (1956): 1686. ISSN 0007-1447. PMC 2412015.
- King, W. G. (1914). "Asino-Vaccine". The Indian Medical Gazette. 49 (5): 206. ISSN 0019-5863. PMC 5181488. PMID 29006394.
- King, W. G. (1904). "Sanitary Inspectors in Madras". The Indian Medical Gazette. 39 (11): 437–438. ISSN 0019-5863. PMC 5162464. PMID 29003756.
- King, W. G. (1923-12-15). "Sanitation in India". British Medical Journal. 2 (3285): 1183. ISSN 0007-1447. PMC 2317603.
- King, W. G. (1895). "Presidential Address in Public Health". The Indian Medical Gazette. 30 (1): 14–20. ISSN 0019-5863. PMC 5142931. PMID 29002019.
- King, W. G. (1911). "Sanitary Law in India". Journal of the Royal Institute of Public Health. 19 (2): 91–107. ISSN 0368-3982. JSTOR 45162845.
- King, W.G (1914). "Madras City Water-Supply". The Lancet. 183 (4720): 497–498. doi:10.1016/S0140-6736(00)54575-9.
- KING, W. G. (1910). "A Latrine for the Tropics". Journal of the Royal Institute of Public Health. 18 (7): 402–405. ISSN 0368-3982. JSTOR 45162187.
