= New Zealand Journal of Asian Studies =

- Discipline: Asian studies
- Language: English
- Edited by: Paola Voci and Sekhar Bandyopadhyay

Publication details
- History: 1999-present
- Publisher: New Zealand Asian Studies Society (New Zealand)
- Frequency: Biannual

Standard abbreviations
- ISO 4: N. Z. J. Asian Stud.

Indexing
- ISSN: 1174-8915
- OCLC no.: 62516390

Links
- Journal homepage

The New Zealand Journal of Asian Studies is a peer-reviewed academic journal that was founded in June 1999. It is the official journal of the New Zealand Asian Studies Society. The journal covers a broad range of Asia-related topics. It is published biannually, in June and in December. The journal contains a mixture of academic articles and reviews, from contributors both within and outside New Zealand.

The editors-in-chief are Paola Voci (University of Otago) and Sekhar Bandyopadhyay (Victoria University of Wellington).
