= Cuisines of the Axis of Evil and Other Irritating States =

- Author: C. Christine Fair
- Illustrator: James Polisky
- Cover artist: James Polisky
- Language: English
- Subject: International cuisine
- Genre: Cookbook
- Publisher: The Lyons Press
- Publication date: August 3, 2008
- Publication place: United States
- Pages: 336
- ISBN: 1-59921-286-2

Cuisines of the Axis of Evil and Other Irritating States: A Dinner Party Approach to International Relations is a political satire-based cook book written with a left-leaning point of view authored by C. Christine Fair. Inspired by George W. Bush's 2002 State of the Union address, the book utilizes recipes for dishes from the so-called Axis of Evil countries such as Iran, Iraq and North Korea as well as other nations such as Cuba, Israel and the United States mixed with political humor.

== See also ==
- War on Terror (game)
