= Ajay Skaria =

Scholar of South Asian Politics

Ajay Skaria is a scholar of South Asian Politics and History and is associated with Postcolonial and Subaltern Studies. He is currently teaching at University of Minnesota in the Department of History.

Skaria received his Masters in Medieval Indian History from Maharaja Sayajirao University and a PhD in History from Trinity College, Cambridge in 1992.

== Selected publications ==
- Shades of Wildness Tribe, Caste, and Gender in Western India , The Journal of Asian Studies, 1997
- Hybrid Histories: Forests, Frontiers and Wildness in Western India, Oxford University Press, 1999, ISBN 0-19-564310-0
- "Women, Witchcraft and Gratuitous Violence in Colonial Western India" in Past & Present no. 155, Oxford University Press, 1997
- "Writing, Orality and Power: The Dangs, 1800s-1920s" in Subaltern Studies Volume 9, 1997
- "Some Aporias of History. Time, Truth and Play in Dangs, Gujarat" in Economic and Political Weekly, Vol 34, no.15, April 10–16, 1999
- "Unconditional Equality: Gandhi's Religion of Resistance, 2016
