= John Beverley (Latin Americanist) =

American literary and cultural critic

John Randolph Beverley II is a literary and cultural critic at the University of Pittsburgh, where he is a professor of Spanish and Latin American Literature and Cultural Studies as well as an adjunct professor in the English and communication departments. He was influential in co-founding the Latin American subaltern studies group as well as a founding member of the Graduate Program in Cultural Studies at the University of Pittsburgh.

Beverley has written a number of texts on the testimonio, which can concern popular representation in literature and politics. He has taken the position that Latin America's own ideological structures have prevented the area's most progressive intellectuals from grasping their own reality. With the end of the cold war, the defeat of the Sandinistas and the full emergence of postmodern perspectives in Latin Americanist discourse, he produced a collection entitled The Post-Modern Debate in Latin America. While working on that text, he along with Ileana Rodríguez and others, co-founded the Latin American Subaltern Studies group, seeking a new post-cold war/post-sandinista post/postmodedrn theorization of the relations between culture, literature and political possibility, which he and other members (following Ernesto Laclau and others involved in cultural studies theory, but above all the South Asian Subaltern studies Group—at first through Gayatri Spivack and then more directly through R. Guha and others) saw as centered not directly on social classes but on the social groups and movements that struggled for empowerment and expression in the Americas.

In Against Literature, he writes from a subalternist perspective, and considers literature and existing literary studies (even leftwing versions) as implicated in hegemonic modernization projects at odds with subaltern positions. This view, now developed in relation to developing Latin American cultural studies discourse and in relation to the full emergence of globalization as the new macro-narrative of the post-postmodern period, became the subject of Subalternity and Representation (1999). The Latin American subaltern group dissolved early in the 21st century, but Beverley has continued working, co-developing a Pittsburgh University Press book series called “Illuminations: Cultural Formations of the Americas,” publishing a new collection on Cuban literature, re-publishing his book with Hugo Achugar on testimonio, and completing Testimonio: The Politics of Truth (2004). In Latin Americanism after 9/11 (2014), he argues for a new situation for Latin America in the emerging global order, especially in view of Hugo Chávez, Evo Morales and other new left figures who have challenged older paradigms of left and right of previous decades. He critiques what he considers the failed politics of Zapatismo, and the “neo-conservative turn.”

== List of works ==
- The Failure of Latin America: Postcolonialism in Bad Times. (2019).
- Latin Americanism after 9/11. (2014).
- (ed.) From Cuba (2002)
- (ed.) La voz del otro: Testimonio, subalternidad y verdad narrativa (new edition; 2002)
- Subalternity and Representation, Arguments in Cultural Theory (1999)
- Una modernidad obsoleta: estudios sobre el barroco (1998)
- Against Literature (1993)
- "Aspects of Gongora's 'Soledades'" (1980)
- "Del Lazarillo al Sandinismo" (1987)
- "Literature and Politics in the Central American Revolutions" (1990)
