= Ranajit Guha =

Indian historian (1923–2023)

- Born: 23 May 1923; Siddhakati, Bengal Presidency, British India
- Died: 28 April 2023 (aged 99); Vienna Woods, Austria
- Known for: Pioneering the Subaltern Studies Group

Academic background
- Education: Presidency College, Calcutta; Calcutta University

Academic work
- Institutions: University of Sussex; Australian National University
- Notable students: Dipesh Chakrabarty; Partha Chatterjee; Gayatri Chakravorty Spivak

Ranajit Guha FAHA (23 May 1923 – 28 April 2023) was an Indian historian and the founder of the Subaltern Studies Collective. Guha's scholarship challenged traditional elite-centered narratives, emphasising the agency of peasants and subaltern communities in shaping historical processes. His influential works, including Elementary Aspects of Peasant Insurgency in independent India, have left a lasting impact on the fields of South Asian history, postcolonial studies, and historiography. Guha was nominated an Honorary Fellow of the Australian Academy of the Humanities in 1996.

== Early life and career ==
Born on 23 May 1923 in Siddhakatti, Backergunge District of British India (present-day Bangladesh), Guha hailed from a lineage of khas taluqdars. His grandfather was a revenue official, and his father, Radhika Ranjan Guha, was an advocate, who later became a judge of the Dacca High Court. Guha's elder brother, Deba Prasad, was a notable scholar of Pali in Rangoon and Banaras.

Guha pursued his education at the Mitra Institution and subsequently earned his undergraduate degree from Presidency College, Calcutta. His academic trajectory continued with postgraduate studies in history at the University of Calcutta. During his formative years, Guha found inspiration in the works of Indian historian Susobhan Sarkar. He also acknowledged his affluent family background and upbringing in East Bengal, and some of his early influences including writers D. H. Lawrence, Fyodor Dostoevsky, and the Bengali poet Michael Madhusudan Dutt.

Engaging in political activism during the 1940s, Guha affiliated with the Communist Party of India, represented the party at the World Federation of Democratic Youth in London. Following his return to India in 1953, he distanced himself from political engagements after the Soviet invasion of Hungary in 1956.

Commencing his teaching career at Chandernagore Government College in 1953, Guha faced suspension from the Bengal Educational Services due to scrutiny of his political history. Subsequently, he was employed by Jadavpur University. In 1959, Guha embarked on a migration to the United Kingdom, securing a fellowship at the University of Manchester to complete his doctoral thesis. In 1962, he assumed the position of a Reader in history at the University of Sussex. Noteworthy is his departure from Sussex in 1981, when he accepted a position at the Australian National University, where he concluded his distinguished career, retiring in 1988.

== Research ==
=== Subaltern Studies Group ===
In the 1980s, Ranajit Guha was instrumental in developing an alternative approach to the study of the South Asian past. Criticising the elitist focus of existing historical scholarship, he highlighted the experiences and agency of marginalised groups and people. This approach gave rise to Subaltern Studies, or the Subaltern Study Group, which became an influential strand of postcolonial and post-Marxist historiography.

Guha's Elementary Aspects is considered a seminal work in the field. In the first volume of Subaltern Studies, he defined the "subaltern" as those outside the elite sectors of Indian society, a concept borrowed from Italian Marxist theorist Antonio Gramsci to emphasise the importance of marginalised voices of the peasants, independent of the dominant groups. The Subaltern Studies framework encouraged scholars to examine the roles of class, caste, and gender in shaping historical narratives.

Guha influenced a generation of scholars, including Partha Chatterjee, Gayatri Chakravorty Spivak, and Dipesh Chakrabarty.

== Personal life ==
Residing in Purkersdorf, Austria, situated on the periphery of the Vienna Woods, Ranajit Guha lived with his partner Mechthild Guha (née Jungwirth), a German-born scholar. The couple first met each other at the University of Sussex in the early 1960s, a period during which Guha attained prominence, subsequently relocating to the Australian National University, where their scholarly endeavours persisted. Guha died at home on 28 April 2023 at the age of 99.

== Select bibliography ==
=== Author ===
- A rule of property for Bengal: an essay on the idea of permanent settlement, Paris [etc.]: Mouton & Co., 1963; new edition, Duke University Press, ISBN 0-8223-1761-3
- Elementary Aspects of Peasant Insurgency in Colonial India, Oxford University Press, Delhi, 1983; new edition, Duke University Press, 1999, ISBN 0-8223-2348-6
- "History at the Limit of World-History" (Italian Academy Lectures), Columbia University Press, 2002
- An Indian Historiography of India: A Nineteenth Century Agenda & Its Implications. Calcutta: K.P. Bagchi & Company. 1988.
- Dominance without Hegemony: History and Power in Colonial India, Harvard University Press, 1998
- The Small Voice of History, Permanent Black, 2009, (Collection of essays, edited by Partha Chatterjee).

=== Editor ===
- Subaltern Studies I: Writings on South Asian History and Society. New Delhi, Oxford University Press, 1982.
- Subaltern Studies II: Writings on South Asian History and Society. New Delhi, Oxford University Press, 1983.
- Subaltern Studies III: Writings on South Asian History and Society. New Delhi, Oxford University Press, 1984.
- Subaltern Studies IV: Writings on South Asian History and Society. New Delhi, Oxford University Press, 1985.
- Subaltern Studies V: Writings on South Asian History and Society. New Delhi, Oxford University Press, 1987.
- Selected Subaltern Studies. New York: Oxford University Press, 1988, (co-edited with Gayatri Chakravorty Spivak).
- Subaltern Studies VI: Writings on South Asian History and Society. New Delhi, Oxford University Press, 1989.
- A Subaltern Studies Reader,1986–1995. University of Minnesota Press, 1997, ISBN 0-8166-2758-4

== Select works about Guha ==
- Sathyamurthy, T. V. (1990). "Indian peasant historiography: A critical perspective on Ranajit Guha's work". The Journal of Peasant Studies, 18(1), 92–144. doi:10.1080/03066159008438445
- Arnold, David; Hardiman, David. (1994). Subaltern Studies VIII: Essays in Honour of Ranajit Guha. Delhi: Oxford University Press.

== See also ==
- Subaltern Studies
- Partha Chatterjee
- Dipesh Chakrabarty
- Gayatri Spivak
