= Sudipta Kaviraj =

Indian academic

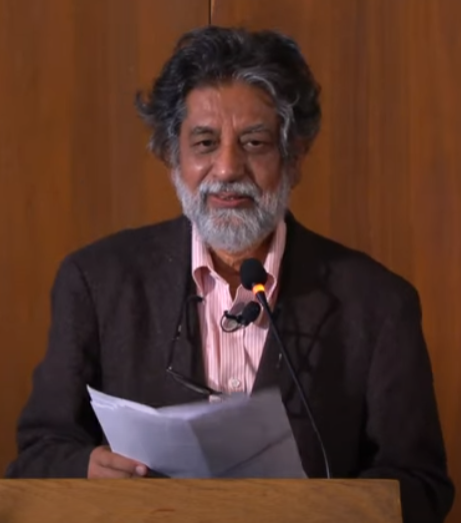
- Giving the lecture "The Search for Paradise" at UC Berkeley in 2024
- Born: 1945 (age 80–81)
- Education: Presidency College; Jawaharlal Nehru University
- Occupation: Academic
- Employer: Columbia University

Sudipta Kaviraj (born 1945) is a scholar of South Asian Politics and Intellectual History, often associated with Postcolonial and Subaltern Studies. He is currently teaching at Columbia University in the department of Middle Eastern, South Asian and African Studies.

== Education ==
Sudipta Kaviraj was a student of Political Science at the Presidency College of the University of Calcutta. He received his Ph.D. from Jawaharlal Nehru University, New Delhi.

== Career ==
He is a Professor of South Asian Politics and South Asian Intellectual History, as well as the former department chair of the Middle Eastern, South Asian, and African Studies department at Columbia University. Prior to joining Columbia University, he was a Professor in Politics in the Department of Politics at the School of Oriental and African Studies at the University of London. He was also Associate Professor of Political Science at JNU, New Delhi. He also held a Visiting Fellowship at St Antony's College, Oxford.

He was a founding member of the Subaltern Studies Collective.

== Selected publications ==
- 'Indira Gandhi and Indian Politics', Economic and Political Weekly, 21(38-39), 1697-1708. 1986.
- 'The Imaginary Institution of India', Subaltern Studies, VII, pp.1-39. 1993.
- 'Crisis of the nation-state in India', Political Studies, 42(1_suppl), 115-129. 1994
- The Unhappy Consciousness: Bankimchandra Chattopadhyay and the Formation of Nationalist Discourse in India, 1995, ISBN 0-19-564585-5
- Politics in India, Oxford University Press, 1999. (Edited anthology) ISBN 0-19-564873-0
- Civil Society: History and Possibilities, Cambridge University Press, 2001. (Edited with Sunil Khilnani) ISBN 0-521-63344-3
- The Imaginary Institution of India. Columbia University Press/Permanent Black, 2010, ISBN 81-7824-357-1
- The Invention of Private Life: Literature and Ideas. Columbia University Press, 2015.
