= Subaltern Studies =

Group of South Asian scholars of postcolonial and post-imperial underclasses

The Subaltern Studies Group (SSG) or Subaltern Studies Collective is a group of South Asian scholars interested in postcolonial and post-imperial societies. The term Subaltern Studies is sometimes also applied more broadly to others who share many of their views. Subaltern Studies is often considered to be "exemplary of postcolonial studies" and as one of the most influential movements in the field. Their anti-essentialist approach is one of history from below, focused more on what happens among the masses at the base levels of society than among the elite.

== Definition ==
The term "subaltern" in this context is an allusion to the work of Italian Marxist Antonio Gramsci (1891–1937). The term's semantic range has evolved from its first usage by Ranajit Guha, following Gramsci, to refer solely to peasants who had not been integrated into the industrial capitalist system. It now refers to any person or group of inferior rank or station, whether because of race, class, gender, sexual orientation, ethnicity, or religion.

The SSG arose in the 1980s, influenced by the scholarship of Eric Stokes and Ranajit Guha, to attempt to formulate a new narrative of the history of India and South Asia. The group started at the University of Sussex, then continued and spread, mainly through Guha's students. The narrative strategy of subaltern studies, inspired by the writings of Gramsci, was explicated in the writings of their mentor Ranajit Guha, most clearly in his "manifesto" in Subaltern Studies I and also in his classic monograph The Elementary Aspects of Peasant Insurgency. Although the scholars associated with the Subaltern Studies Group are, in a sense, on the left, they are very critical of the traditional Marxist narrative of Indian history, in which semi-feudal India was colonized by the British, became politicized, and earned its independence. In particular, they are critical of the focus of this narrative on the political consciousness of elites, who in turn inspire the masses to resistance and rebellion against the British.

Instead, they focus on non-elites, subalterns, as agents of political and social change. They have had a particular interest in the discourses and rhetoric of emerging political and social movements, as against only highly visible actions like demonstrations and uprisings.

== Criticism ==
One of the group's early contributors, Sumit Sarkar, later began to critique it. He entitled one of his essays "Decline of the Subaltern in Subaltern Studies", criticizing the turn to Foucauldian studies of power-knowledge that left behind many of the empiricist and Marxist efforts of the first two volumes of Subaltern Studies. He writes that the socialist inspiration behind the early volumes led to a greater impact in India itself, while the later volumes' focus on western discourse reified the subaltern-colonizer divide and then rose in prominence mainly in western academia. Even Gayatri Spivak, one of the most prominent names associated with the movement, has called herself a critic of "metropolitan post-colonialism".

American sociologist Vivek Chibber has criticized the premise of Subaltern Studies for its obfuscation of class struggle and class formation in its analysis and accused it of excising class exploitation from the story of the oppression of the subaltern. His critique, explained in his book Postcolonial Theory and the Specter of Capital, is focused on the works of two Indian scholars: Ranajit Guha and Dipesh Chakrabarty. According to Chibber, subaltern scholars tend to recreate the Orient as a place where cultural differences negate analyses based on Western experience.

== Bibliography of Subaltern Studies ==
| Edition | Publication date | Editors | Title | Pages | Publisher |
|---|---|---|---|---|---|
| 1 | 1982 | Ranajit Guha | Writings on South Asian History and Society | 231 | Delhi: Oxford University Press |
| 2 | 1983 | Ranajit Guha | Writings on South Asian History and Society | 358 | Delhi: Oxford University Press |
| 3 | 1984 | Ranajit Guha | Writings on South Asian History and Society | 327 | Delhi: Oxford University Press |
| 4 | 1985 | Ranajit Guha | Writings on South Asian History and Society | 383 | Delhi: Oxford University Press |
| 5 | 1987 | Ranajit Guha | Writings on South Asian History and Society | 296 | Delhi: Oxford University Press |
| 6 | 1989 | Ranajit Guha | Writings on South Asian History and Society | 335 | Delhi: Oxford University Press |
| 7 | 1993 | Partha Chatterjee and Gyanendra Pandey | Writings on South Asian History and Society | 272 | Delhi: Oxford University Press |
| 8 | 1994 | David Arnold and David Hardiman | Writings on South Asian History and Society | 240 | Delhi: Oxford University Press |
| 9 | 1996 | Shahid Amin and Dipesh Chakrabarty | Writings on South Asian History and Society | 248 | Delhi: Oxford University Press |
| 10 | 1999 | Gautam Bhadra, Gyan Prakash, and Susie Tharu | Writings on South Asian History and Society | 252 | Delhi: Oxford University Press |
| 11 | 2000 | Partha Chatterjee and Pradeep Jeganathan | Community, Gender and Violence | 347 | New York: Columbia University Press |
| 12 | 2005 | Shail Mayaram, M. S. S. Pandian, and Ajay Skaria | Muslims, Dalits, and the Fabrications of History | 322 | New Delhi: Permanent Black and Ravi Dayal Publisher |
| 13 | 2019 | Brahma Prakash | Cultural Labour: Conceptualizing the 'Folk Performance' in India | 352 | Delhi: Oxford University Press |

== People associated with Subaltern Studies ==
Scholars associated with Subaltern Studies include:

- Shahid Amin
- David Arnold
- Gautam Bhadra
- Dipesh Chakrabarty
- Partha Chatterjee
- Ranajit Guha
- David Hardiman
- Sudipta Kaviraj
- Gyanendra Pandey
- M.S.S. Pandian
- Gyan Prakash
- Sarojini Sahoo
- Ajay Skaria
- Gayatri Chakravorty Spivak
- Susie Tharu
- Brahma Prakash

== See also ==
- Latin American subaltern studies
- Latino philosophy
- Orientalism
- Edward Said
- Howard Zinn
