= Tanika Sarkar =

Indian historian

Tanika Sarkar is a historian of modern India based at the Jawaharlal Nehru University. Sarkar's work focuses on the intersections of religion, gender, and politics in both colonial and postcolonial South Asia, in particular on women and the Hindu right.

== Life and education ==
Tanikar Sarkar was born to Amal Bhattacharya, professor of English at Presidency College, and Sukumari Bhattacharji, Sanskritist and scholar on early Indian culture. She was married to fellow historian, Sumit Sarkar.

Sarkar earned a B.A. in History from the Presidency College, University of Calcutta, in 1972. She also earned a degree in Modern History from the University of Calcutta in 1974. She received her PhD from the University of Delhi in 1981.

== Career ==
She retired as a professor of history at the Jawaharlal Nehru University, New Delhi.

She had also taught at the St. Stephen's College, the Indraprastha College, and the University of Chicago.

== Publications ==
- Bengal 1928-1934: The Politics of Protest (Oxford University Press India, 1987), ISBN 978-0195620764.
- Words to Win: A Modern Autobiography (Kali for Women, 1999), ISBN 978-81-85107-44-8.
- Khaki Shorts and Saffron Flags: A Critique of the Hindu Right (co-authored with Tapan Basu, Pradip Datta, Sumit Sarkar and Sambuddha Sen; Orient Longman, 1993), ISBN 978-0863113833.
- Women and the Hindu Right (co-edited with Urvashi Butalia; Kali for Women, 1995), ISBN 978-8185107677.
- Women and Right-Wing Movement: Indian Experiences (co-edited with Urvashi Butalia; Zed Books, 1995), ISBN 978-1856492898.
- Hindu Wife, Hindu Nation: Community, Religion, Cultural Nationalism (Hurst, 2001), ISBN 978-1850655824.
- Women and Social Reform in Modern India: A Reader (co-edited with Sumit Sarkar; Indiana University Press, 2008), ISBN 978-0253220493.
- Rebels, Wives, Saints: Designing Selves and Nations in Colonial Times (University of Chicago Press, 2009), ISBN 978-1906497293.
- Caste in Modern India: A Reader (two volumes, co-edited with Sumit Sarkar; Permanent Black, 2013), ISBN 978-81-7824-369-6.
- Words to Win: The Making of a Modern Autobiography (Zubaan Books, 2014), ISBN 978-9381017906.
- Calcutta: The Stormy Decades (co-edited with Sekhar Bandyopadhyay; Social Science Press, 2015), ISBN 978-93-83166-07-7.

== Recognition ==
In 2004, she received the Rabindra Puraskar from the Paschimbanga Bangla Akademi, the highest literary award given in West Bengal. She returned it in protest over the police firing in Nandigram in March 2007.
