= Sumit Sarkar =

Indian historian of modern India (1939–2026)

- Born: 1939
- Died: 13 August 2026 (aged 87)
- Education: University of Calcutta; Presidency College
- Occupation: Historian
- Writing career
- Notable awards: Rabindra Puraskar (2004)

Sumit Sarkar (1939 – 13 August 2026) was an Indian historian. He was the author of Swadeshi Movement in Bengal, 1903-1908 (1973), Modern India (1989), and Writing Social History (1998), among others. Sarkar was a founding member of the Subaltern Studies Group as well as one of its most important critics.

== Life and career ==
Sarkar was born in 1939 into a Brahmo family to Susobhan Sarkar. His uncle Rupankar Sarkar was a famous ornithologist. His maternal uncle was Prasanta Chandra Mahalanobis.

He completed his BA (Honours) in History at Presidency College, Calcutta and MA and Ph.D. in the same subject at the University of Calcutta. He taught for many years as a lecturer at the University of Calcutta, and later as a reader at the University of Burdwan. He completed his postdoctoral fellowship at Wolfson College, Oxford. He was professor of history at the University of Delhi between 1974 and 2004.

Sarkar died on 13 August 2026, at the age of 87.

== Works ==
Sarkar's significance in South Asian historiography lay in his role in shaping our understanding of the Swadeshi movement.

== Awards ==
Sarkar was awarded the Rabindra Puraskar literary award for his book Writing Social History by the West Bengal government in 2004. He returned the award in 2007 in protest against the expulsion of farmers from their land by the erstwhile state government ran by the CPI(M) led Left Front (West Bengal).

== Controversy ==
Sarkar was one of the founding members of the Subaltern Studies Collective, but later distanced himself from the project. He noted that arguments made in the later issues of the journal as well as in books by Partha Chatterjee blanketly criticized Enlightenment, the nation-state and secularism lined up with indigenist critiques that were at home with the Hindu right. In his view this error was traceable to a basic confusion in the early project that posed an absolute separation between the elite and subaltern domains.

He contributed a volume to the Towards Freedom project of the Indian Council of Historical Research (ICHR), publication of which was blocked in 2000 by the ICHR under the influence of then Indian government administered by the Bharatiya Janata Party as alleged by Sarkar. The publication of the volume was eventually allowed by the Government of India once the Congress party came to power after the general election of 2004.

== Publications ==
- Modern Times (Ranikhet, 2014)
- Towards Freedom: Documents on the Movement for Independence in India, 1946 (New Delhi, 2007)
- A Critique of Colonial India (Papyrus, 2000)
- Beyond Nationalist Frames: Post-Modernism, Hindu Fundamentalism, History (Delhi, 2002)
- Writing Social History (Delhi, 1998)
- Khaki Shorts and Saffron Flags: A Critique of the Hindu Right, (with Tapan Basu, Pradip Datta, Tanika Sarkar and Sambuddha Sen; Orient Longman, 1993). ISBN 0863113834.
- Modern India: 1885-1947, (Basingstoke, 1989)
- The Swadeshi Movement in Bengal, 1903-1908 (New Delhi, 1973)
- Women and Social Reform in Modern India: A Reader, edited with Tanika Sarkar (Indiana University Press, 2008)
- Women and Social Reform in Modern India, edited with Tanika Sarkar (Ranikhet, 2011)
- Caste in Modern India, edited with Tanika Sarkar (Ranikhet, 2015)
- Essays Of A Lifetime: Reformers, Nationalists, Subalterns (Ranikhet, 2017)
- Uncollected Writings, Compiled by Tanika Sarkar; Introduction by Ravi Ahuja (Ranikhet, 2025)
