= Institute of History of Nicaragua and Central America =

Nicaraguan-based research institute

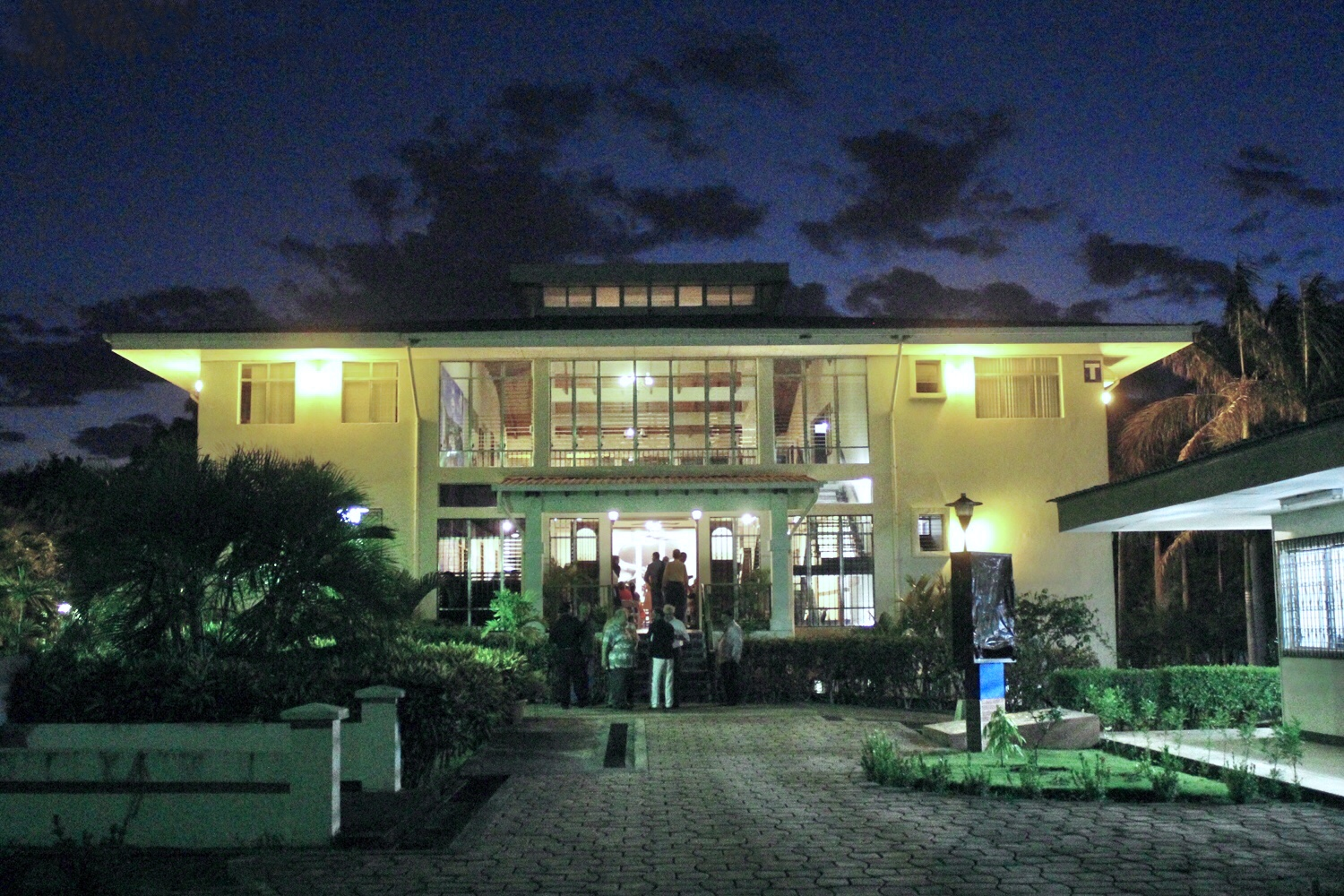
Instituto of History of Nicaragua and Central America (IHNCA) at the Central American University (UCA) in Managua, Nicaragua.

The Institute of History of Nicaragua and Central America (Spanish: Instituto de Historia de Nicaragua y Centroamérica, IHNCA) is a research institute that is connected to the Central American University in Nicaragua.

The institute is settled at the campus of the university in Managua. The building has several halls and rooms for lectures, research, documentation, and expositions.

The IHNCA originates out of a merger in 1997 of the Library of the Central-American Historical Institute (Biblioteca del Instituto Histórico Centroamericano) and the Institute of History of Nicaragua (Instituto de Historia de Nicaragua). These institutes were founded in 1934 and 1987 respectively.

The institute is dedicated to the research, spread of knowledge on history, and the administration of historical heritage. It has executed thorough research and looks after an archive of more than 50,000 books, many papers, audio recordings, films, video's, maps and collections of paintings, masks and other artifacts

In 2009, the institute received one of the Prince Claus Awards from the Netherlands.
