= Amiya Kumar Bagchi =

Indian economic historian (1936–2024)

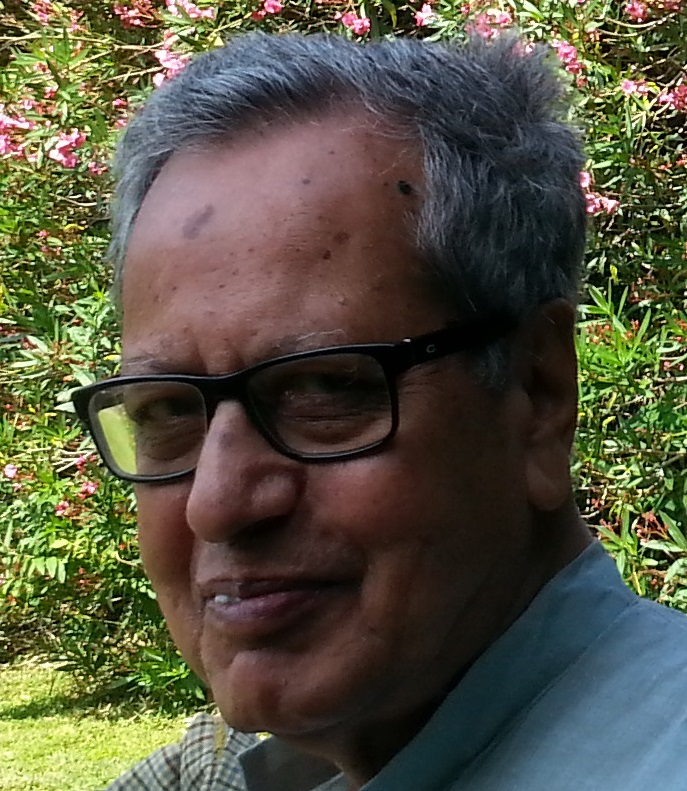
- Born: 1936
- Died: 28 November 2024 (aged 87–88)

Academic work
- Discipline: Economics
- Sub-discipline: Economic history
- Institutions: Cambridge University; Centre for Studies in Social Sciences, Calcutta; Institute of Development Studies, Kolkata

Amiya Kumar Bagchi (1936 – 28 November 2024) was an Indian economic historian.

== Life and career ==
Bagchi earned his masters in economics at Presidency College, Kolkata, and his PhD from Trinity College, Cambridge in 1963. His teaching career began at Presidency College, followed by a stint in the Faculty of Economics at the University of Cambridge in the 1960s, where he was a Fellow of Jesus College. He resigned his post in 1969 to return to Presidency College.

In 1974 he joined the newly founded Centre for Studies in Social Sciences, Calcutta.

Bagchi specialised in the history of Indian banking and finance, and acted as official historian of the State Bank of India until 1997.

After retiring in 2001 as Reserve Bank of India Chair Professor from the Centre for Studies in Social Sciences, Calcutta, he became the founder-director of the Institute of Development Studies, Kolkata.

Bagchi died on 28 November 2024.

== Awards and honours ==
In 2005, Bagchi was awarded the Padma Shri.

== Bibliography ==
Bagchi authored over 250 academic articles and authored and edited numerous books and monographs.

The books he authored included:

- 2010 Colonialism and Indian Economy, Oxford University Press
- 2005 Perilous Passage: Mankind and the Global Ascendancy of Capital, Rowman & Littlefield Publishers
- 2004 The Developmental State in History and in the Twentieth Century, New Delhi: Regency
- 2002 Capital and Labour Redefined: India and the Third World, Anthem Press
- 1997 The Evolution of the State Bank of India: The Era of the Presidency Banks 1876–1920, Sage Publications
- 1989 The Presidency Banks and the Indian Economy 1876–1914, Bombay: Oxford University Press
- 1987 Public Intervention and Industrial Restructuring in China, India and Republic of Korea, New Delhi: ILO-ARTEP
- 1987, reissued 2006 The Evolution of the State Bank of India. The Roots, 1806–1876, Oxford University Press; reissued by Penguin Portfolio
- 1982 The Political Economy of Underdevelopment, Cambridge University Press
- 1972 Private Investment in India 1900–1939, Cambridge University Press

=== Edited and co-edited volumes ===
- 2013 Transformation and Development: The Political Economy of Transition in China and India (with Anthony P. D'Costa) New Delhi: Oxford University Press
- 2007 Capture and Exclude: Developing Economies and the Poor in Global Finance (with Gary A. Dymski) New Delhi: Tulika
- 2005 Webs of History: Information, Communication and Technology from Early to Post-Colonial India (with D. Sinha and B. Bagchi), New Delhi: Manohar
- 2005 Maladies, Preventives, and Curatives: Debates in Public Health in India (with K. Soman), New Delhi: Tulika
- 2003 Economy and the Quality of Life: Essays in Memory of Ashok Rudra (with M. Chattopadhyay and R. Khasnabis), Kolkata: Dasgupta & Co.
- 2002 Money and Credit in Indian History since Early Medieval Times, New Delhi: Tulika
- 1999 Multiculturalism, Liberalism and Democracy (with R. Bhargava and R. Sudarshan), Oxford University Press
- 1999 Economy and Organization: Indian Institutions under the Neoliberal Regime, Sage Publications
- 1995 Democracy and Development: Proceedings of the IEA Conference Held in Barcelona, Spain, Palgrave Macmillan
- 1995 New Technology and the Workers’ Response: Microelectronics, Labour and Society, Sage Publications
- 1988 Economy, Society and Polity: Essays in the Political Economy of Indian Planning in Honour of Professor Bhabatosh Datta, Oxford University Press

=== Chapters in books ===
- Bagchi, Amiya Kumar (2009), "The capability approach and the political economy of human development", in Kanbur, Ravi; Basu, Kaushik (eds.), Arguments for a better world: essays in honor of Amartya Sen | Volume II: Society, institutions and development, Oxford New York: Oxford University Press, pp. 31–47, ISBN 9780199239979.
