= Institute of Development Studies, Kolkata =

Indian research institute

Institute of Development Studies Kolkata
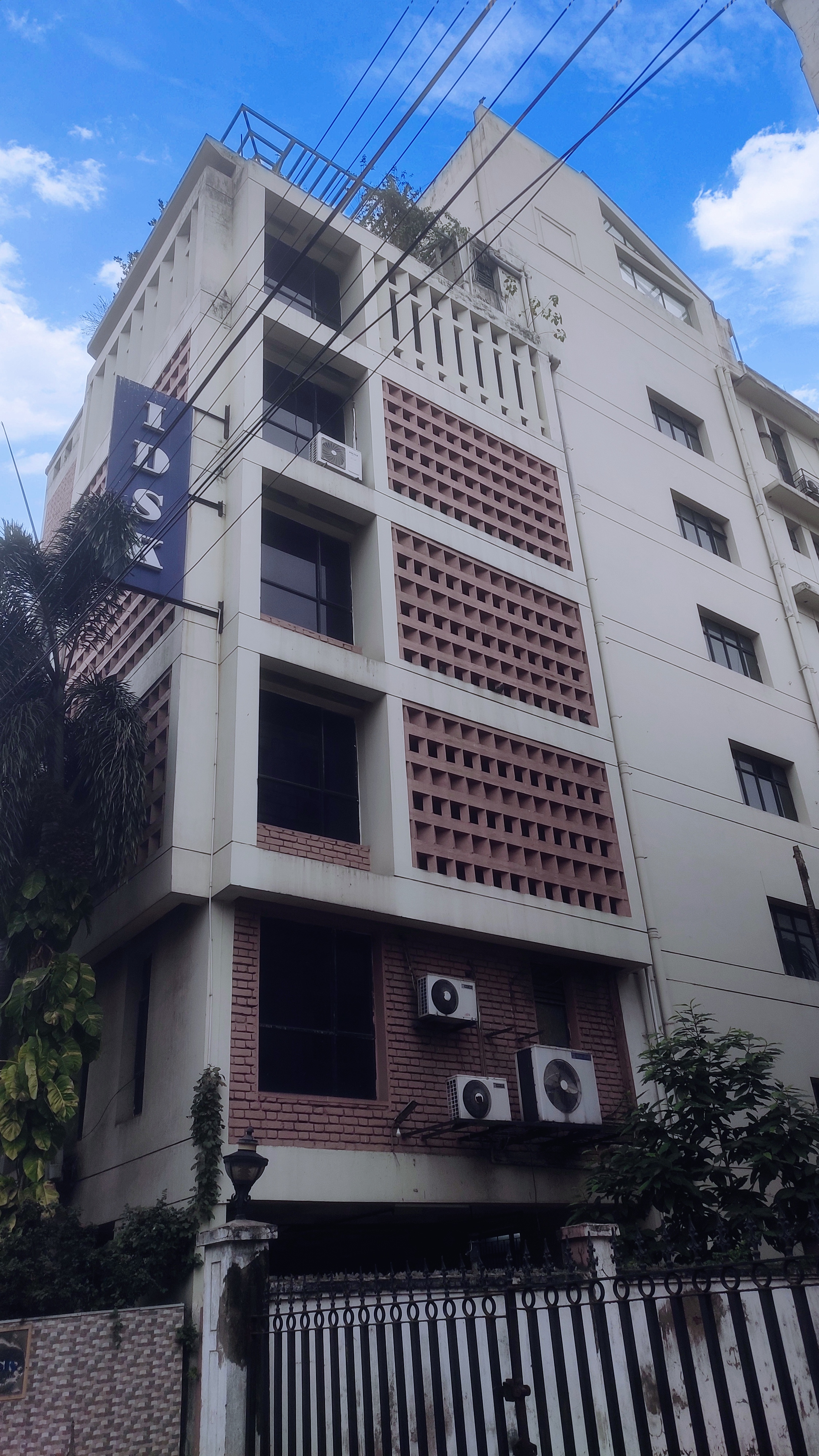
- Type: Autonomous research institute
- Established: 2002
- Affiliations: University of Calcutta
- President: Sabyasachi Basu Ray Chaudhury
- Director: Indrani Chakraborty
- Location: DD Block, Sector 1, Bidhannagar, West Bengal, India; 22.589950°N 88.410478°E
- Campus: urban
- Website: idsk.edu.in

- Location within Kolkata Location within India

The Institute of Development Studies Kolkata (IDSK) is an autonomous research institute dedicated for development studies and related subfields in Bidhannagar, West Bengal, India. Established in 2002 as a centre of excellence in social sciences, the institute is funded by the Government of West Bengal and recognised by the Indian Council of Social Science Research (ICSSR).

== History ==
The IDSK was set up in 2002 by the Government of West Bengal as an autonomous centre of excellence in social sciences. Economist Amiya Kumar Bagchi was appointed as its Founder Director; he was later bestowed with the designation of Emeritus Professor of Economics at the institute.

The multidisciplinary MPhil in Development Studies course at the institute was introduced in 2006, while the PhD in Development Studies course started in 2016, both under the auspices of the University of Calcutta.

In 2014, IDSK was recognised by the Indian Council of Social Science Research (ICSSR) under the 'New Category of ICSSR Recognized Institutes'.

== Collaborations ==
IDSK has collaborated with the following institutions:

- University of Calcutta: The M.Phil. and PhD programme is offered by IDSK in collaboration with the Centre for Social Sciences and Humanities of the University of Calcutta; the degrees are conferred by the university. The two institutions have jointly set up the Rabindranath Tagore Centre for Human Development Studies (RTCHDS).
- Department of Economics, University of Siena
- Monash University
- School of Public Affairs, Zhejiang University
- Roma Tre University

Scholars like Amartya Sen and Joseph Stiglitz have been associated with the institute.

== Departments ==
IDSK has 6 departments:

- Department of Development Studies
- Department of Regional Development
- Department of Economics
- Department of History
- Department of Sociology and Anthropology
- University Library

== See also ==
- Education in India
