= Gautam Bhadra =

Indian historian

Gautam Bhadra (Bengali: গৌতম ভদ্র; born 1948 in Kolkata) is a historian of South Asia and was a member of the erstwhile Subaltern Studies collective.He favoured bringing to light the lower sections of the Indian people till recently neglected by writing of history.

== Career ==
His original home is Uthali village in Satkhira district of Bangladesh. obtained education at Chetla Boys School, Presidency College (Bengali: প্রেসিডেন্সি কলেজ, কলকাতা), thereafter from Jadavpur University and Jawaharlal Nehru University (Bengali: জওহরলাল নেহরু বিশ্ববিদ্যালয়). He started teaching at the Department of History, University of Calcutta (Bengali: কলিকাতা বিশ্ববিদ্যালয়) and continued there for more than 15 years. After that, he became the professor of history at Centre for Studies in Social Sciences, Calcutta (Bengali: সেন্টার ফর স্টাডিজ ইন সোশাল সায়েন্সেস) (1996-2010). He was the second Tagore National Fellow at the National Library in Kolkata. Currently he is Honorary Professor at the Centre for Studies in Social Sciences (Jadunath Bhavan Museum and Resource Centre).

== Awards and honours ==
In 2011, Bhadra was conferred with the Bengali literary award, Ananda Puraskar (Bengali: আনন্দ পুরস্কার), for his book 'Nyara Bot-tolaye Jai Ko-bar?' (Bengali: ন্যাড়া বটতলায় যায় কবার?).

== Books ==
- Bangalar Bhakti Andolone Paribartaner Dhara
- Jaal Rajar Kotha: Bardhamaner Pratapchand
- Nimnabarger Itihas (edited)
- Charlie Chaplin O Tatkalin Markin Samaj
- Iman O Nishan
- Munshi Abdul Karim Sahityabisharad O Attosattar Rajniti
- Parbantar
- Nyara Battalay Jay Kobar
- Mughal Juge Krishi Arthoniti O Krishak Bidroho
- On Modern Indian Sensibilities
