= Susobhan Sarkar =

Indian historian (1900–1982)

Susobhan Chandra Sarkar
- Born: 19 August 1900; Dhaka, Bengal Presidency, British India
- Died: 26 August 1982 (aged 82); Calcutta, West Bengal, India
- Education: Presidency College, Calcutta, Jesus College, Oxford
- Occupation: Historian

Susobhan Chandra Sarkar (1900–1982) was an Indian historian.

== Background and education ==
Sarkar, son of Suresh Chandra Sarkar, was born into a Brahmo family of Dhaka. He attended Dhaka Collegiate School, studied history at Presidency College, Calcutta and continued his higher education at Jesus College, Oxford, from 1923 to 1925. His daughter Sipra Sarkar was a professor of history at Jadavpur University, Calcutta and Sumit Sarkar was professor of history at Delhi University.

== Career ==
He returned to India as a Lecturer in History at Calcutta University before being appointed Reader in History at Dhaka University in 1927. Through the 1920s he was involved in the administration of Visva-Bharati, Santiniketan, still under the active tutelage of its founder, Rabindranath Tagore. In 1932, he was appointed Professor of History at Presidency College, Calcutta. He will be remembered as a long serving professor of the college who inspired generations of students from both science and arts streams.

He moved to Jadavpur University as Professor in 1956. He returned to Calcutta University for his final academic post from 1961 to 1967.

Sarkar, whose work was influenced by his Marxist and Gramscian ideas, taught the history of modern Europe, particularly the development of constitutional history in Britain and political thought in Western Europe. He also wrote from the 1930s about the Bengal Renaissance. His Notes on Bengal Renaissance sparked an interest in nationalist Indian historiography. He also wrote the manifesto of the CPI.

His student, Sabyasachi Bhattacharya writes, "Beyond the walls of the Presidency College and the two Universities he served in Calcutta, Professor Sarkar is known to historians through his writing- on the Bengal Renaissance (a theme to which he returned time and again, as if to his own roots), on historiography, on contemporary history, and, in a more specialised way, on the seamy commercial underside of the expanding British empire in eighteenth century South Asia. Further, as an interpreter of Marxism to a wider audience, he offered a new perspective on history in a series of essay in Bengali, of which one became a locus classicus, the, essay Itihaser Dhara (Calcutta, 1944). Yet the essential Sarkar is not to be found in what he left behind in his writings. It was to be found in the life he led, like some others of his generation, dedicated to a vocation and an ideology. It was the moral integrity in this dedication which left its mark on the minds of his students."

== Bibliography ==
1. Sushobhan C. Sarkar, 'A Note on Puran Giri Gosain', Bengal Past & Present, Vol. 43, April–June 1932, pp. 83–87.
2. S.C. Sarkar and K.K. Datta, 'Text-book of modern Indian history (from 1526 to the present day), Vol. II', Patna: Bihar Publishing House, 1934.
3. Susobhan Chandra Sarkar, 'Mahayuddher Par Iurop' (Europe Since the Great War), Calcutta: Calcutta University, 1938. (Bengali)
4. Susobhan Chandra Sarkar, 'Samāja o itihāsa', Calcutta: Bak, 1957.
5. Susobhan C. Sarkar, 'Derozio and Young Bengal' in A.C. Gupta (ed.), Studies in Bengal Renaissance (Calcutta, 1958), p. 486.
6. S.C. Sarkar, 'The Norris embassy to Aurangzib: (1699-1702)' by Harihar Das (condensed and rearranged), Calcutta: Firma K.L. Mukhopadhyay, 1959.
7. Susobhan Chandra Sarkar, 'Rammohun Roy on Indian Economy' (ed.), Calcutta: Socio-Economic Research Institute, 1965.
8. Susobhan Sarkar, 'Bengal Renaissance and Other Essays', New Delhi: People's Publishing House, 1970.
9. Sushobhan Sarkar, 'Itihasher Dhara', Calcutta: Manisha Granthalaya, 1975. (Bengali)
10. Susobhan Sarkar, 'A Marxian glimpse of history', New Delhi: People's Publishing House, 1975.
11. Essays in Honour for Professor S.C. Sarkar, New Delhi: People's Publishing House, 1976.
12. Susobhan Sarkar, 'On the Bengal Renaissance', Calcutta: Papyrus: 1979.
13. Sushobhan Sarkar, 'Prasanga Rabindrasangīta', Calcutta: Ānanda Publishers, 1982. (Bengali)
14. Sushobhan Sarkar, 'Prasanga Rabīndranātha', Calcutta: Ānanda Publishers, 1983. (Bengali)
15. Susobhan Chandra Sarkar, 'Itihāsacarcā', Calcutta: Nabarka, 1985. (Bengali)

== Legacy ==
The Paschimbanga Itihas Samsad, in collaboration with Presidency University, Kolkata (erstwhile Presidency College), has been organizing a lecture series in Sarkar's memory since 1994.
