= Plague in India =

Plague and famine have been recurrent features of life in the South Asian subcontinent countries of India, Pakistan, Sri Lanka and Bangladesh. The two health disasters often go hand-in-hand. That failures to scientifically examine the remains of disaster victims can lead to misidentifications and misinterpretations is now recognised in the research literature. While forensic dentistry is taught in India, the use of odontology to help explain historical problems is in its infancy.

== 400 BCE or before Vesali ==
The earliest known plague in India is documented by the Ratana Sutta which records an outbreak in the time of the Buddha that occurred in the north Indian city of Vesali. As he came into the city the sutta was recited and the plague subsided. This text has long been used as a paritta or protective text, one of the early instances of texts used in this manner mentioned in the Milindapanha.

== 525-26 Anuradhapura ==
According to the Pali historical sources, a plague and famine assailed Sri Lanka in the time of Upatissa II of Anuradhapura (reg. 525 – 526). Following the precedent set in the time of the Buddha, the king ordered the Ratana Sutta to be recited by monks while walking the streets of the city. In the words of the Culavamsa:

"He instituted a great alms-giving Ceremony and established security (of life) for all living creatures. Then after that he adorned the town (so that it was) as the world of the gods, he descended and was surrounded by all the bhikkhus dwelling in the Island, to the principal street. Then the bhikkhus who had gathered there reciting the Ratana Sutta and pouring out water, walked about the street, not far from the royal palace, near the wall, round which they walked with their right side towards it in three watches of the night. When morning dawned a great cloud poured rain on the earth and all who had suffered from those diseases, held a high festival... the Lord of men decreed: 'When there shall be on the Island an evil such as famine, plague or the like, thus shall it be done'."

This event in Sri Lanka anticipates the Plague of Justinian.

== 930s South India and Sri Lanka ==
The Culavamsa reports that Kassapa V of Anuradhapura (reg. 929 - 939) ordered the Sri Lankan army to withdraw from south India after he heard that troops were dying from plague. The Chola king in this encounter was Parantaka I (reg. 907 - 955).

== 1300s ==
The Black Death spread across the world in the 14th century with devastating effect. For India, accounts of this pandemic are anecdotal, with clear testimony for bubonic plague found only from the 17th century. This has led some to think the disease did not reach India in the 1300s, a premature conclusion given plague is mentioned in Tughlaq dynasty sources. Since 2015, new evidence has been published, and a fresh examination of historical and philological problems undertaken. In addition, archaeo-pathology research has documented the Black Death in central Asia, a region with close links to India at the time.

A number of human skeletons, possibly of the 14th century, were found during conservation work on the south side of the medieval Nīlakaṇṭheśvara temple, Udaypur, Madhya Pradesh. These were quietly disposed of for fear of stirring up controversy. Somewhat later, human remains were found at Ujjain, near the Mahākāl temple. The absence of scientific examinination led to unsubstantied speculation on the part of the press. While the date of the Ujjain remains is an open question, the site, like Udaypur, flourished under the Paramara rulers.

== 1790s Dharwad ==
A mass burial of over 600 individuals was found near Annigeri in Navalgund taluk, Dharwad district and reported widely in the press. In 2014, a report on the findings was published by the Directorate of Archaeology & Museums, Karnataka. A full account, summarising the shifting interpretations, was prepared by K. V. Ramakrishnarao and posted on his Blog in 2020.

== Third plague pandemic 1896-1920s ==
India was hard hit during the third plague pandemic, which had started in China in the 1850s and reached Bombay (now Mumbai) in 1896. This Bombay plague epidemic spread to the rest of the country, causing at least 10 million deaths in British India before ending in the early 1920s.

== 1994 north India ==
In September 1994, India experienced an outbreak of plague that killed over 50 people and caused travel to New Delhi by air to be suspended until the outbreak was brought under control. The outbreak was feared to be much worse because the plague superficially resembles other common diseases such as influenza and bronchitis; over 200 people that had been quarantined were released when they did not test positive for the plague. Cases were detected in Maharashtra (488 cases), Gujarat (77 cases), Karnataka (46 cases), Uttar Pradesh (10 cases), Madhya Pradesh (4 cases) and New Delhi (68 cases).

== See also ==
- Black Death in the Middle East
- Famine in India
- COVID-19 pandemic in India
