= Dipesh Chakrabarty =

Indian historian (born 1948)

- দীপেশ চক্রবর্তী
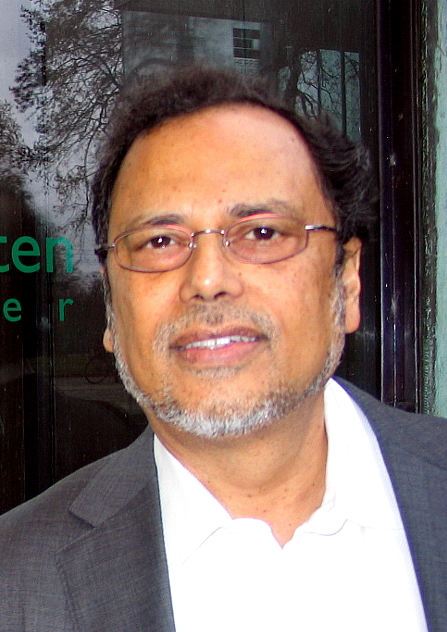
- Born: 1948 (age 77–78); Kolkata, India
- Spouse: Rochona Majumdar
- Awards: Toynbee Prize

Academic background
- Education: Presidency College; Indian Institute of Management Calcutta; Australian National University

Academic work
- Main interests: Subaltern Studies, Postcolonialism

Dipesh Chakrabarty (born 1948 in Kolkata, India) is an Indian historian and leading scholar of postcolonial theory and subaltern studies. He is the Lawrence A. Kimpton Distinguished Service Professor in history at the University of Chicago, and is the recipient of the 2014 Toynbee Prize, which recognizes social scientists for significant academic and public contributions to humanity. He is the author of the book Provincializing Europe: Postcolonial Thought and Historical Difference (2000) and of the essay "The Climate of History: Four Theses" (2009).

== Education ==
Dipesh Chakrabarty attended Presidency College, Kolkata, where he received his undergraduate degree in physics. He also received a postgraduate diploma in management (MBA) from Indian Institute of Management Calcutta. Later he attended the Australian National University in Canberra, where he earned a PhD in history.

== Career ==
Chakrabarty's academic appointments include visiting fellow at the Princeton Humanities Institute (2002); visiting professor of history at the Centre for Studies in Social Sciences, Calcutta (2003); visitor at the State University of New York Humanities Center (2004); visiting fellow at the University of Göttingen Max Planck Institute for Historical Sciences (2005); faculty at the University of California, Irvine Seminar in Experimental Critical Theory (2005); visiting research professor at the University of Technology Sydney (2005 and 2009); visitor at the Jawaharlal Nehru University Center for Historical Studies (2005); scholar-in-residence at the Pratt Institute (2005); visiting professor at the European Humanities University (2006); Ida Beam Distinguished Visiting Professor at the University of Iowa (2007); Distinguished Visitor at the University of Minnesota Institute of Advanced Study (2007); fellow at the Berlin Institute for Advanced Study (2008–09); Katz Professor in the Humanities at the University of Washington (2009); Hallsworth Visiting Professor at the University of Manchester (2009); Institute for Human Science (IWM) (2010); Lansdowne Lecturer at Victoria University, Toronto (2012); Nicholson Distinguished Visiting Scholar at the University of Illinois Urbana-Champaign (2013); Principal's Distinguished Visitor at Queen's University at Kingston; distinguished visitor at the Stony Brook University Humanities Institute; visitor at the University of Barcelona; visiting fellow at the Australian National University Humanities Research Centre (2014); and GLASS scholar at the Leiden University Institute for Area Studies (2015).

In 2014, Chakrabarty delivered the IWM Lectures in Human Sciences and a public lecture at Çankaya District. In 2015, he gave one of the Tanner Lectures on Human Values at Yale University on "The Human Condition in the Anthropocene".

He also served on the Humanities jury for the Infosys Prize from 2014 to 2016.

== Sexual harassment allegations ==
Academic C. Christine Fair accused Chakrabarty of making inappropriate sexual comments to her and others during her time as a student in 1994. The University of Chicago released a statement in 2017 inviting students to formally report such allegations. In 2021, the Graduate Employees' Organization at the University of Illinois Urbana-Champaign protested the university's decision to host Chakrabarty at a roundtable on criticism and interpretive theory, in response to Fair's allegations.

Following a defamation lawsuit, Fair retracted her allegations against Chakrabarty's wife.

== Honours ==
- 2004: Fellow of the American Academy of Arts and Sciences
- 2006: Honorary Fellow of the Australian Academy of the Humanities
- 2010: Honorary Doctor of Letters from the University of London
- 2011: Honorary Doctorate from the University of Antwerp
- 2011: Distinguished Alumnus Award from the Indian Institute of Management Calcutta
- 2014: Toynbee Prize
- 2019: Rabindra Puraskar from the Government of West Bengal for The Crisis of Civilization
- 2021: Honorary doctorate from the École normale supérieure
- 2021: Jadunath Sarkar Memorial Gold Medal from The Asiatic Society
- 2023: Prix européen de l’essai for Après le changement climatique: penser l’histoire (French translation of The Climate of History in a Planetary Age)

== Bibliography ==
=== Books ===
==== In English ====
- Rethinking Working Class History (1989)
- Provincializing Europe: Postcolonial Thought and Historical Difference (2000)
- Habitations of Modernity: Essays in the Wake of Subaltern Studies (2002)
- The Calling of History: Sir Jadunath Sarkar and His Empire of Truth (2015)
- The Crises of Civilization: Exploring on Global and Planetary Histories (2018)
- Some Aspects of Labor History of Bengal in the Nineteenth Century: Two Views (2019), written with Ranajit Dasgupta
- The Climate of History in a Planetary Age (2021)
- One Planet, Many Worlds: The Climate Parallax (2023)

==== In Bengali ====
- ইতিহাসের জনজীবন ও অন্যান্য প্রবন্ধ (আনন্দ পাবলিশার্স, 2011)
- মানবিকতা ও অ-মানবিকতা (অনুষ্টুপ, 2018)
- মনোরথের ঠিকানা (অনুষ্টুপ, 2018)
- উন্নয়ন ও আধুনিকতা: বর্তমান-সর্বস্ব এই সময় (কলিকাতা লেটারপ্রেস, 2019)
- সাম্প্রতিক ইতিহাস-ভাবনা: আমার ইতিহাসের আলপথ ধরে (তালপাতা প্রকাশনা, 2019)
- বন্ধুর চিঠি বন্ধুকে (with রাঘব বন্দ্যোপাধ্যায়) (অনুষ্টুপ, 2019)
- স্মৃতি সত্তা সংলাপ (নির্ঝর, 2020)
- জলবায়ু পরিবর্তন ও বর্তমান অতিমারি: মানুষের ইতিহাসে একটি সন্ধিক্ষণ (লৌকিক প্রকাশন, 2021)

=== Edited volumes ===
- Cosmopolitanism (2002), edited with Carol Breckenridge, Sheldon Pollock, and Homi K. Bhabha
- From the Colonial to the Postcolonial: India and Pakistan in Transition (2007), edited with Rochona Majumdar and Andrew Sartori
- Historical Teleologies in the Modern World (2015), edited with Henning Trüper and Sanjay Subrahmanyam

=== Selected articles ===
- "Postcoloniality and the Artifice of History: Who Speaks for 'Indian' Pasts?" Representations 37 (Winter 1992): 1–26.
- "The Death of History? Historical Consciousness and the Culture of Late Capitalism." Public Culture 4.2 (Spring 1992): 47–65.
- "Universalism and Belonging in the Logic of Capital." Public Culture 12.3 (Fall 2000): 653–678.
- "Where Is the Now?" Critical Inquiry 30 (Winter 2004): 458–462.
- "The Climate of History: Four Theses." Critical Inquiry 35.2 (Winter 2009): 197–222.
- "Postcolonial Studies and the Challenge of Climate Change." New Literary History 43.1 (Winter 2012): 1–18.
- "Climate and Capital: On Conjoined Histories." Critical Inquiry 41.1 (Autumn 2014): 1–23.
- "Humanities in the Anthropocene: The Crisis of an Enduring Kantian Fable." New Literary History 47.2/3 (Spring–Summer 2016): 377–397.
