= Partha Chatterjee (scholar) =

Indian academic (born 1947)

- Born: 5 November 1947 (age 78); Calcutta, West Bengal, India

Education
- Education: Presidency College, Calcutta; Calcutta University; University of Rochester

Partha Chatterjee (born 5 November 1947) is an Indian political scientist and anthropologist. He was the director of the Centre for Studies in Social Sciences, Calcutta from 1997 to 2007 and continues as an honorary professor of political science. He is also a professor of anthropology and South Asian studies at Columbia University and a member of the Subaltern Studies Collective.

Chatterjee received the Fukuoka Asian Culture Prize in 2009.

== Education ==
He completed a BA (1967) and an M.A (1970) in political science from Presidency College, Calcutta and University of Rochester respectively. He completed his Ph.D. (1972) in international relations from the University of Rochester.

== Career ==
He was the professor of political science and served as a director of the Centre for Studies in Social Sciences, Calcutta from 1997 to 2007. He is currently a professor (honorary) of the CSSSC and professor of anthropology and South Asian studies at Columbia University in New York. He was a founder-member of the Subaltern Studies Collective.

== Publications ==
Books

- 1975. Arms, Alliances and Stability: The Development of the Structure of International Politics, Macmillan.
- 1986. Nationalist Thought and the Colonial World. London: Zed Books.
- 1993. The Nation and its Fragments: Colonial and Postcolonial Histories. Princeton University Press
- 1995. Texts of Power. Minneapolis University of Minnesota Press.
- 1997. A Possible India. New Delhi: Oxford University Press.
- 1997. The Present History of West Bengal. New Delhi: Oxford University Press.
- 2003. A Princely Impostor? The Strange and Universal History of the Kumar of Bhawal. Princeton University Press.
- 2004. The Politics of the Governed: Popular Politics in Most of the World, Columbia University Press
- 2010. Empire and Nation: Selected Essays 1985-2005, Columbia University Press.
- 2011. Lineages of Political Society: Studies in Postcolonial Democracy, Columbia University Press.
- 2012. The Black Hole of Empire: History of a Global Practice of Power, Princeton University Press.
- 2020. I Am the People: Reflections on Popular Sovereignty Today, Columbia University Press.
- 2022. The Truths and Lies of Nationalism as Narrated by Charvak, State University of New York Press.
- 2025. For a Just Republic: The People of India and the State: Permanent Black

=== In Edited Volumes ===
- CHATTERJEE, PARTHA. “On Religious and Linguistic Nationalisms: The Second Partition of Bengal.” In Nation and Religion: Perspectives on Europe and Asia, edited by Peter van der Veer and Hartmut Lehmann, 112–28. Princeton University Press, 1999. https://doi.org/10.2307/j.ctv15r5dnf.9.
- Chatterjee, Partha. “Two Poets and Death: On Civil and Political Society in the Non-Christian World.” In Questions of Modernity, edited by Timothy Mitchell, NED-New edition., 11:35–48. University of Minnesota Press, 2000. http://www.jstor.org/stable/10.5749/j.ctttsqrg.6.
- Chatterjee, Partha. “Sovereign Violence and the Domain of the Political.” In Sovereign Bodies: Citizens, Migrants, and States in the Postcolonial World, edited by Thomas Blom Hansen and Finn Stepputat, 82–100. Princeton University Press, 2005. http://www.jstor.org/stable/j.ctt7sdbh.8.
- Chatterjee, Partha. “WHOSE IMAGINED COMMUNITY?” In Nations and Nationalism: A Reader, edited by Philip Spencer and Howard Wollman, 237–47. Edinburgh University Press, 2005. http://www.jstor.org/stable/10.3366/j.ctvxcrmwf.20.
- Chatterjee, Partha. “The Contradictions of Secularism.” In The Crisis of Secularism in India, edited by Anuradha Dingwaney Needham and Rajeswari Sunder Rajan, 141–56. Duke University Press, 2007. https://doi.org/10.2307/j.ctv11hpmw8.11.
- CHATTERJEE, PARTHA. “Terrorism: State Sovereignty and Militant Politics in India.” In Words in Motion: Toward a Global Lexicon, edited by Carol Gluck and Anna Lowenhaupt Tsing, 240–62. Duke University Press, 2009. https://doi.org/10.2307/j.ctv1134dkk.15.
- Chatterjee, Partha. “REFLECTIONS ON ‘CAN THE SUBALTERN SPEAK?’: SUBALTERN STUDIES AFTER SPIVAK.” In Can the Subaltern Speak?: Reflections on the History of an Idea, edited by ROSALIND C. MORRIS, 81–86. Columbia University Press, 2010. http://www.jstor.org/stable/10.7312/morr14384.6.

Other Publications

- Chatterjee, Partha. “The Classical Balance of Power Theory.” Journal of Peace Research 9, no. 1 (1972): 51–61. http://www.jstor.org/stable/422972.
- Chatterjee, Partha. “From Balance of Power to Imperialism: Analysis of a System Change in International Politics: Summary.” Proceedings of the Indian History Congress 34 (1973): 261–261. http://www.jstor.org/stable/44138728.
- Chatterjee, Partha. “On the Rational Choice Theory of Limited Strategic War.” The Indian Journal of Political Science 34, no. 2 (1973): 157–72. http://www.jstor.org/stable/41854567.
- Chatterjee, Partha. “Modern American Political Theory with Reference to Underdeveloped Nations.” Social Scientist 2, no. 12 (1974): 24–42. https://doi.org/10.2307/3516206.
- Chatterjee, Partha. “The Equilibrium Theory of Arms Races: Some Extensions.” Journal of Peace Research 11, no. 3 (1974): 203–11. http://www.jstor.org/stable/423019.
- Chatterjee, Partha. “The Equilibrium Theory of Arms Races: Reply to the Comments by F. E. Banks.” Journal of Peace Research 12, no. 3 (1975): 239–41. http://www.jstor.org/stable/422552.
- Chatterjee, Partha. “Bengal: Rise and Growth of a Nationality.” Social Scientist 4, no. 1 (1975): 67–82. https://doi.org/10.2307/3516391.
- Chatterjee, Partha. “In Birbhum after the Floods.” Economic and Political Weekly 13, no. 49 (1978): 2001–2. http://www.jstor.org/stable/4367161.
- Chatterjee, Partha. “Problems of a Marxist Political Theory: Considerations on Colletti.” Economic and Political Weekly 16, no. 42/43 (1981): PE2–8. http://www.jstor.org/stable/4370358.
- Chatterjee, Partha. “Peasants, Politics and Historiography: A Response.” Social Scientist 11, no. 5 (1983): 58–65. https://doi.org/10.2307/3517104.
- Chatterjee, Partha. “Modes of Power: Some Clarifications.” Social Scientist 13, no. 2 (1985): 53–60. https://doi.org/10.2307/3520191.
- Chatterjee, Partha. “Transferring a Political Theory: Early Nationalist Thought in India.” Economic and Political Weekly 21, no. 3 (1986): 120–28. http://www.jstor.org/stable/4375224.
- Chatterjee, Partha. “The Colonial State and Peasant Resistance in Bengal 1920-1947.” Past & Present, no. 110 (1986): 169–204. http://www.jstor.org/stable/650652.
- Chatterjee, Partha. “On Gramsci’s ‘Fundamental Mistake.’” Economic and Political Weekly 23, no. 5 (1988): PE24–26. http://www.jstor.org/stable/4378045.
- 1988. The Nationalist Resolution of the Women's Question. Centre for Studies in Social Sciences, Calcutta.
- Chatterjee, Partha. “For an Indian History of Peasant Struggle.” Social Scientist 16, no. 11 (1988): 3–17. https://doi.org/10.2307/3517458.
- Chatterjee, Partha. “Colonialism, Nationalism, and Colonialized Women: The Contest in India.” American Ethnologist 16, no. 4 (1989): 622–33. http://www.jstor.org/stable/645113.
- Chatterjee, Partha. “History and the Nationalization Of Hinduism.” Social Research 59, no. 1 (1992): 111–49. http://www.jstor.org/stable/40970686.
- Chatterjee, Partha. “Secularism and Toleration.” Economic and Political Weekly 29, no. 28 (1994): 1768–77. http://www.jstor.org/stable/4401459.
- Chatterjee, Partha. “Community in the East.” Economic and Political Weekly 33, no. 6 (1998): 277–82. http://www.jstor.org/stable/4406377.
- Chatterjee, Partha. “Five Hundred Years of Fear and Love.” Economic and Political Weekly 33, no. 22 (1998): 1330–36. http://www.jstor.org/stable/4406835.
- Chatterjee, Partha. “Beyond the Nation? Or Within?” Economic and Political Weekly 32, no. 1/2 (1997): 30–34. http://www.jstor.org/stable/4404962.
- Chatterjee, Partha. “How We Loved the Bomb and Later Rued It.” Economic and Political Weekly 33, no. 24 (1998): 1437–41. http://www.jstor.org/stable/4406875.
- Chatterjee, Partha. “Beyond the Nation? Or Within?” Social Text, no. 56 (1998): 57–69. https://doi.org/10.2307/466770.
- Chatterjee, Partha. “Anderson’s Utopia.” Diacritics 29, no. 4 (1999): 128–34. http://www.jstor.org/stable/1566381.
- Chatterjee, Partha. “Institutional Context of Social Science Research in South Asia.” Economic and Political Weekly 37, no. 35 (2002): 3604–12. http://www.jstor.org/stable/4412549.
- Chatterjee, Partha. “Shoddy Scholarship.” Economic and Political Weekly 38, no. 6 (2003): 494–576. http://www.jstor.org/stable/4413170.
- Chatterjee, Partha. “Empire after Globalisation.” Economic and Political Weekly 39, no. 37 (2004): 4155–64. http://www.jstor.org/stable/4415532.
- Chatterjee, Partha. “The Last Maverick: Ismail Merchant.” India International Centre Quarterly 32, no. 4 (2006): 29–41. http://www.jstor.org/stable/23005892.
- Chatterjee, Partha. “India’s Divide: Economic Growth and Marginalized Groups.” The Brown Journal of World Affairs 14, no. 2 (2008): 139–47. http://www.jstor.org/stable/24590720.
- Chatterjee, Partha. “The Near Future of Social Science Research in India.” Economic and Political Weekly 43, no. 5 (2008): 38–40. http://www.jstor.org/stable/40276970.
- Chatterjee, Partha. “Democracy and Economic Transformation in India.” Economic and Political Weekly 43, no. 16 (2008): 53–62. http://www.jstor.org/stable/40277640.
- Chatterjee, Partha. “Classes, Capital and Indian Democracy.” Economic and Political Weekly 43, no. 46 (2008): 89–93. http://www.jstor.org/stable/40278188.
- Chatterjee, Partha. “The Coming Crisis in West Bengal.” Economic and Political Weekly 44, no. 9 (2009): 42–45. http://www.jstor.org/stable/40278553.
- Chatterjee, Partha. “In Memoriam: Anjan Ghosh.” Economic and Political Weekly 45, no. 26/27 (2010): 37–39. http://www.jstor.org/stable/40736690.
- Partha Chatterjee. “The Movement against Politics.” Cultural Critique 81 (2012): 117–22. https://doi.org/10.5749/culturalcritique.81.2012.0117.
- Chatterjee, Partha. “Regional Bias.” Economic and Political Weekly 47, no. 3 (2012): 4–4. http://www.jstor.org/stable/41419720.
- Chatterjee, Partha. “After Subaltern Studies.” Economic and Political Weekly 47, no. 35 (2012): 44–49. http://www.jstor.org/stable/41720086.
- Chatterjee, Partha. “Indian Cinema: Then and Now.” India International Centre Quarterly 39, no. 2 (2012): 45–53. http://www.jstor.org/stable/41804040.
- Chatterjee, Partha. “Subaltern Studies and ‘Capital.’” Economic and Political Weekly 48, no. 37 (2013): 69–75. http://www.jstor.org/stable/23528277.
- Chatterjee, Partha. “Historicising Caste in Bengal Politics.” Economic and Political Weekly 47, no. 50 (2012): 69–70. http://www.jstor.org/stable/41720469.
- Chatterjee, Partha. “Remembering Asok Sen.” Economic and Political Weekly 51, no. 6 (2016): 30–32. http://www.jstor.org/stable/44004350.
- Chatterjee, Partha. “Freedom of Speech in the University.” Economic and Political Weekly 51, no. 11 (2016): 35–37. http://www.jstor.org/stable/44004098.
- Chatterjee, Partha. “Javeed Alam: A Remarkable Activist-Intellectual.” Social Scientist 45, no. 1/2 (2017): 81–86. http://www.jstor.org/stable/26380331.
- Chatterjee, Partha. “Gramsci in India: Capitalist Hegemony and Subaltern Politics.” Studi Storici 58, no. 4 (2017): 963–86. http://www.jstor.org/stable/45096710.
