= Ben Cowling =

British epidemiologist (born 1979)

Ben Cowling MBE
- Born: Benjamin John Cowling; 11 June 1979; Reading, UK
- Education: University of Warwick (BSc, PhD)
- Known for: COVID-19 research
- Children: 2 sons
- Scientific career
- Fields: Epidemiology; Medical statistics
- Institutions: University of Hong Kong; Imperial College London
- Thesis: Survival models for censored point processes (2003)
- Doctoral advisors: Jane Hutton; Ewart Shaw

Benjamin John Cowling MBE FFPH (born 11 June 1979) is a British epidemiologist and medical statistician. Cowling is Chair Professor of Epidemiology and Head of the Division of Epidemiology and Biostatistics at the University of Hong Kong Li Ka Shing Faculty of Medicine's School of Public Health.

== Early life and education ==
Cowling was raised in Sonning, England. He attended Sonning Church of England Primary School and, from 1990 to 1997, Reading School.

He obtained his BSc in mathematics, operational research, statistics, and economics (MORSE) in 2000 from the University of Warwick, and then a PhD from the same university in 2003.

== Career and research ==
After his PhD, Cowling joined Imperial College London as a postdoctoral research statistician.

He moved to Hong Kong in 2004, first as a senior research assistant at the School of Public Health of the University of Hong Kong (HKU), climbing the ranks gradually and becoming an assistant professor in 2008. He was promoted to associate professor in 2013, when he started to head the Division of Epidemiology and Biostatistics. He became Chair Professor of Epidemiology in July 2022. He now heads the World Health Organisation Collaborating Centre for Infectious Disease Epidemiology and Control at HKU.

Cowling's research is mostly about infectious disease epidemiology, including field studies of respiratory virus transmission, the effectiveness of influenza vaccines and infection immunity. During the COVID-19 pandemic, he and his team shifted the focus to the COVID-19 disease.

He also gave interviews to multiple local and global media throughout the COVID-19 pandemic.

Currently outside HKU, Cowling is the editor-in-chief of Influenza and Other Respiratory Viruses, a member of the MIDAS network (a group of global infectious disease experts that study them with computational methods), a member of the Center for Communicable Disease Dynamics at the Harvard T.H. Chan School of Public Health, Harvard University. He also sits on the Council of the International Society for Influenza and other Respiratory Virus Diseases.

== Honours and awards ==
- Fellow of the Faculty of Public Health (2014)
- Member of the Order of the British Empire (MBE) (2021)
