= 1918 flu pandemic in India =

Known in India as "Bombay Fever"

1918 flu pandemic in India was the outbreak of an unusually deadly influenza pandemic in British India between 1918 and 1920 as a part of the worldwide Spanish flu pandemic. Also referred to as the Bombay Influenza or the Bombay Fever in India, the pandemic is believed to have killed up to 17–18 million people in the country, the most among all countries. Historian David Arnold estimates at least 12 million dead, about 5% of the population. The decade between 1911 and 1921 was the only census period in which India's population fell, mostly due to devastation of the Spanish flu pandemic. The death toll in India's British-ruled districts was 13.88 million.

The pandemic broke out in Bombay in June 1918, with one of the possible routes being via ships carrying troops returning from the First World War in Europe. It hit different parts of the country in two waves, with the second wave being the highest in mortality rate.

The outbreak most severely affected younger people in the age group of 20–40, with women disproportionately impacted. According to the Sanitary Commissioner's report for 1918, the maximum death toll in a week exceeded 200 deaths in both Bombay and Madras. The spread of the disease was exacerbated by a failed monsoon and the resultant famine-like conditions, that had left people underfed and weak, and forced them to move into densely populated cities. As a result of the severity of the outbreak, the year 1919 saw a reduction of births by around 30 percent. The population growth of India during the decade of 1911–1921 was 1.2%, the lowest among all decades under the British Raj. The sanitary commissioner's report for 1918 noted that all rivers across India were clogged up with bodies, because of a shortage of firewood for cremation.

Mahatma Gandhi, leader of India's independence movement, was also infected by the virus. The pandemic had a significant influence in the freedom movement in the country. The healthcare system in the country was unable to meet the sudden increase in demands for medical attention. The consequent toll of death and misery, and economic fallout brought about by the pandemic led to an increase in emotion against colonial rule.

== History ==
=== Initial outbreak at Bombay ===
The pandemic, believed to have originated in Camp Funston, Kansas, made its way to Europe via the American expeditionary force, and soon spread across the Western front to units on both sides.

On the 29th of May, 1918, an Indian troop transport anchored at Bombay for 48 hours. While initially going unnoticed, it is believed this was the initial catalyst for the outbreak of influenza in India, having come loaded with troops returning from Europe. On the 10th of June, seven police officers, one of whom was posted at the docks, were hospitalised with influenza, in what would be India's first reported cases of Spanish flu.

From Bombay, the disease spread inland through India's roads and rails, spreading all over the country by August. The outbreak coincided with a drought affecting the central provinces in 1918, which caused a famine and left large portions of the population vulnerable to disease. Mirroring the rest of the world, the disease hit in three waves, the mild first wave hitting in the summer of 1918, the deadly second wave (where death tolls across the country peaked in the autumn of 1918), and a limited third wave in the early months of 1919.

=== First wave ===
By July 1918, death tolls in Bombay were crossing 200 people a day. Health officials in Bombay debated upon the source of the epidemic, with the Executive Health Officer of the Bombay municipality Dr. J.A. Turner, submitting a report that stated the first signs of a major epidemic came on the 22nd of June, when several bank employees, office workers, and millhands reported themselves absent due to fever. Dr. Turner said the whole city, "may be compared to huge incubator with suitable media already prepared for the dissemination of the germs of the disease, the temperature, moisture and material in suitable conditions".

The first cases in Calcutta and Karachi were reported in the middle of June, and in Madras by the end of June. By July, cases had sprung up in the United Provinces. Reports of influenza began springing up amongst troops stationed in Karachi, Lansdowne, Jabalpur, Abbottabad, Khandwa, Quetta, Dehra Dun, etc. Initially, deaths during the first wave sprung up mostly amongst the very young and old, and were overlooked. Bombay suffered 1,600 deaths in the first wave, with Bihar, Orissa, and the United Provinces having a "mild impact".

=== Second wave ===
The second wave of the pandemic saw a sharp increase in the mortality rate across all provinces. Across the country, death rates peaked from September to November 1918. In the Central Provinces alone, 791,000 deaths were reported from October to November. The flu first hit Delhi in August, with the city suffering its highest casualty rate in October. Delhi suffered 7,044 deaths in October and November, a death rate of 31.2 per mile.

Fatalities in Punjab spiked in October, with a majority of the dead being young adults. Punjab suffered more than 800,000 deaths during the second wave, with the Provincial Sanitary Commissioner stating in a report, "the hospitals were choked so that it was impossible to remove the dead quickly enough to make room for the dying; the burning ghats and burial grounds were literally swamped with corpses, whilst an even greater number awaited removal." Estimates for the dead in Punjab amount to 816,317 deaths, roughly 4.2 percent of the provincial population.

On the 6th of October, 1918, Bombay alone saw 768 deaths. An average of 326 deaths were reported per day in the Bombay presidency. The Times of India reported, "nearly every house in Bombay has some of its inmates down with fever". Overall, Bombay was hit hardest by the second wave, with an estimated total of 20,258 deaths. Madras city saw 3,481 deaths, while Bengal saw 213,098 fatalities.

The second wave of the pandemic had a major impact on the Indian populace. In his memoirs, the Hindi poet Suryakant Tripathi wrote, "Ganga was swollen with dead bodies." He himself had lost his wife and many family members to the flu, but could not find enough firewood to perform their last rites. Indian independence activist and spiritual leader Mahatma Gandhi suffered from influenza in October 1918, having written in his autobiography, "all interest in living had ceased". The healthcare system in the country was unable to meet the sudden increase in demands for medical attention.

Tensions rose between colonial authorities and the Indian populace over the former's handling of the pandemic. Despite the epidemic, Indian-grown food was still being sent overseas to aid the war effort. The poor standard of health infrastructure in the country led to a huge disparity in death rates in India, compared to the rest of the world. While colonial authorities dithered, local organizations associated with the independence movement mobilized to organize relief efforts. Science Journalist Laura Spinney lists the pandemic as the event that put India on the road to revolution, as many of these organizations finally got the grassroots support they had for long struggled for.

== Impact ==
Just prior to the pandemic, a drought in north India led to famine in many parts of the country, leaving many people underfed and weakened. With many of these rural migrants coming from isolated villages in India, and thereby lacking exposure to many of the diseases prevalent in cities, the famine left these people especially vulnerable to the flu. The Sanitary Commissioner also notes the improved transport systems, especially the railways, were a key factor in facilitating the spread of disease across the country.

Of the estimated 50 million deaths worldwide, 10 million to 20 million deaths were from India, the highest death toll worldwide. Several prominent figures in India suffered from influenza, including Charles Freer Andrews, and Mahatma Gandhi.
