= Influenza and Other Respiratory Viruses =

- Discipline: Virology
- Language: English
- Edited by: Ben Cowling

Publication details
- History: 2007-present
- Publisher: John Wiley & Sons
- Frequency: Bimonthly
- Impact factor: 4.380 (2020)

Standard abbreviations
- ISO 4: Influenza Other Respir. Viruses

Indexing
- CODEN: IORVBV
- ISSN: 1750-2640

Links
- Journal homepage; Online archive

Influenza and Other Respiratory Viruses is a peer-reviewed scientific journal covering virology, published by John Wiley & Sons for the International Society for Influenza and other Respiratory Virus Diseases. As of 2018, the editor is Benjamin Cowling. According to the Journal Citation Reports, the journal has a 2020 impact factor of 4.380.

Influenza and Other Respiratory Viruses is the first journal to specialise exclusively on influenza and other respiratory viruses and strives to play a key role in the dissemination of information in this broad and challenging field. It is aimed at laboratory and clinical scientists, public health professionals, and others around the world involved in a broad range of activities in this field. In turn, topics covered will include:

- surveillance
- epidemiology
- prevention by vaccines
- prevention and treatment by antivirals
- clinical studies
- public health & pandemic preparedness
- basic scientific research
- transmission between animals and humans
