= Prafulla Chandra Ray =

Bengali chemist, educationist, nationalist, industrialist and philanthropist

Sir Prafulla Chandra Ray CIE, FNI, FRASB, FIAS, FCS
- Born: Prafulla Chandra Ray; 2 August 1861; Paikgacha, Bengal, British India
- Died: 16 June 1944 (aged 82); Calcutta, Bengal, British India
- Education: University of Edinburgh
- Awards: Order of the Indian Empire (CIE); Knight Bachelor; Fellow of the Chemical Society (FCS); Foundation Fellow of the National Institute of Sciences of India (FNI) (Note: Prior to 1970, the Indian National Science Academy was named the "National Institute of Sciences of India", and its fellows bore the post-nominal "FNI". The post-nominal became "FNA" in 1970 when the association adopted its present name.); Fellow of the Indian Association for the Cultivation of Science (FIAS)
- Scientific career
- Fields: Inorganic chemistry; Organic chemistry; History of chemistry
- Workplaces: Presidency College, Calcutta; Calcutta University College of Science (also known as Rajabazar Science College)
- Thesis: Conjugated Sulphates of the Copper-Magnesium Group: A Study of Isomorphous Mixtures and Molecular Combinations (1887)
- Doctoral advisor: Alexander Crum Brown
- Notable students: Satyendranath Bose; Meghnad Saha; Jnanendra Nath Mukherjee; Jnan Chandra Ghosh

Sir Prafulla Chandra Ray CIE FNI FRASB FIAS FCS (also spelled Prafulla Chandra Roy; Bengali: প্রফুল্ল চন্দ্র রায় Prôphullô Côndrô Rāẏ; 2 August 1861 – 16 June 1944) was an Indian chemist, educationist, historian, industrialist and philanthropist from Bengal. He established the first modern Indian research school in chemistry (post classical age) and is regarded as the father of Indian chemistry.

The Royal Society of Chemistry honoured his life and work with the first ever chemical landmark plaque outside Europe. He was the founder of Bengal Chemicals & Pharmaceuticals, India's first pharmaceutical company. He is the author of A History of Hindu Chemistry from the Earliest Times to the Middle of the Sixteenth Century (1902).

== Biography ==
=== Family background ===
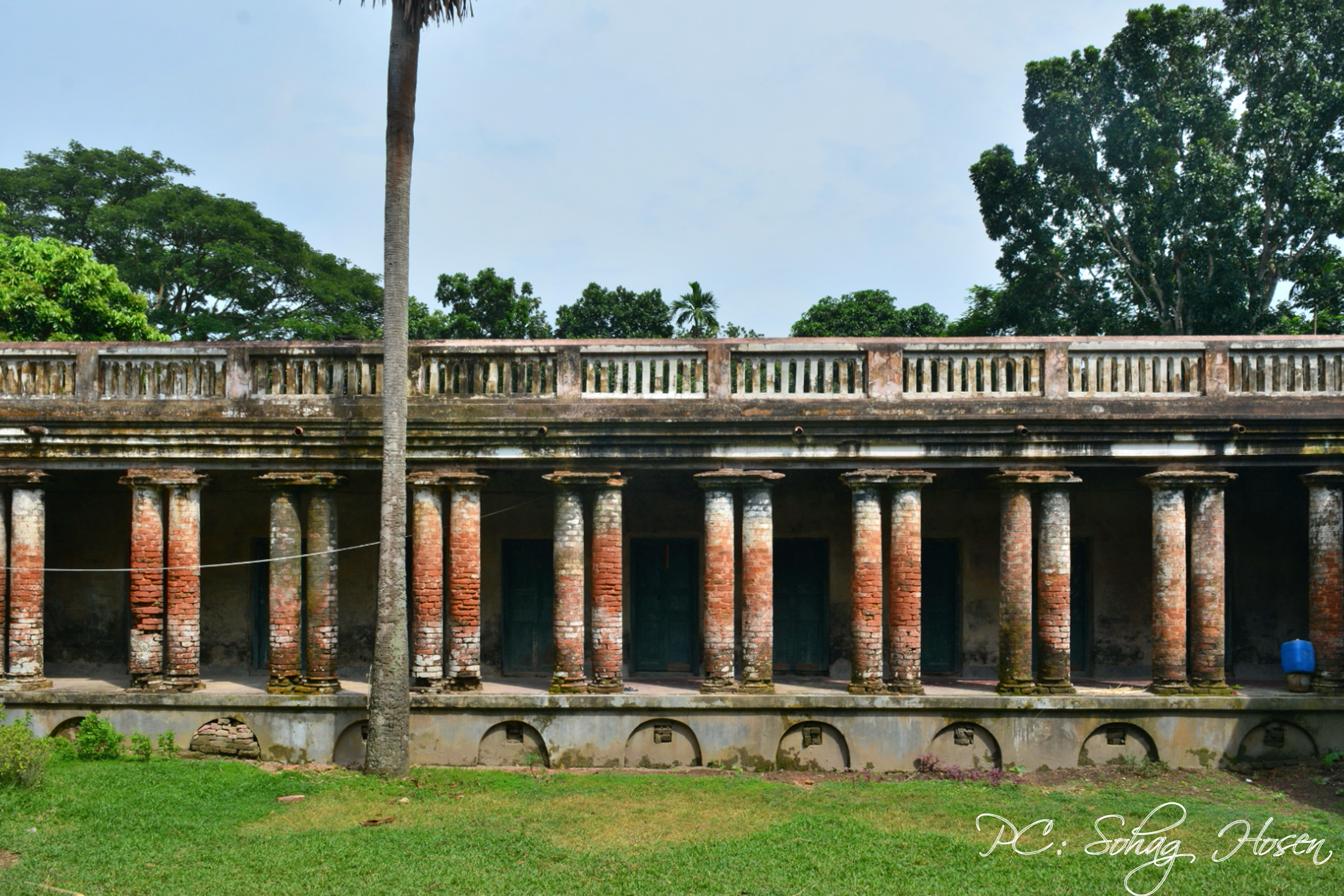
Prafulla Chandra Ray Ancestral House & Birthplace at Khulna

Prafulla Chandra Ray was born in the village of Raruli-Katipara, then in Jessore District (now Paikgachha, Khulna), in the eastern region of the Bengal Presidency of British India (now Bangladesh) to a Bengali Hindu family. He was the third child and son of Harish Chandra Raychowdhury (d. 1893), a Kayastha zamindar and his wife Bhubanmohini Devi (d. 1904), the daughter of a local taluqdar. Ray was one of seven siblings, having four brothers – Jnanendra Chandra, Nalini Kanta, Purna Chandra and Buddha Dev – and two sisters, Indumati and Belamati, both born after their brothers. All except Buddha Dev and Belamati survived to adulthood.

Ray's great-grandfather Maniklal had been a dewan under the British East India Company's district collector of Krishnanagar and Jessore, and had amassed considerable wealth in the service of the company. After succeeding to his father's post, Ray's grandfather Anandlal, a progressive man, sent his son Harish Chandra to receive a modern education at Krishnagar Government College. At the college, Harish Chandra received a thorough grounding in English, Sanskrit and Persian, though he was ultimately forced to end his studies to help support his family. Liberal and cultured, Harish Chandra pioneered English-medium education and women's education in his village, establishing both a middle school for boys and one for girls, and admitting his wife and sister to the latter. Harish Chandra was strongly associated with the Brahmo Samaj, and Ray would maintain his connections with the Samaj throughout his life.

=== Childhood and early education ===
After recovering from an illness, Ray moved to Calcutta in 1876 and was admitted to the Albert School, established by the Brahmo reformer Keshub Chandra Sen; owing to his concentrated self-study over the preceding two years, his teachers found him to have advanced much further than the rest of the students in his assigned class. During this period, he attended Sen's Sunday evening sermons and was deeply influenced by his Sulabha Samachar. In 1878, he passed the school's Entrance Examination (matriculation exams) with a First Division, and was admitted as an FA (First Arts) student to the Metropolitan Institution (later Vidyasagar College) which was established by Pandit Ishwar Chandra Vidyasagar. The English literature teacher at the Institution was Surendranath Banerjee, the prominent Indian nationalist and future president of the Indian National Congress, whose passionately held ideals, including an emphasis on the value of service and the need to continually strive for India's rejuvenation, left a definite and lasting impression on Ray, who took those values to heart. While deeply influenced by Sen, Ray preferred a more democratic environment than the mainstream Brahmo Samaj under Sen's guidance could provide; consequently, in 1879 he joined the Sadharan Brahmo Samaj, a more flexible offshoot of the original Samaj.

Though Ray had primarily focused on history and literature until this stage, chemistry was then a compulsory subject in the FA degree. As the Metropolitan Institution offered no facilities for science courses at the time, Ray attended physics and chemistry lectures as an external student at the Presidency College. He was especially drawn to the chemistry courses taught by Alexander Pedler, an inspiring lecturer and experimentalist who was among the earliest research chemists in India. Soon captivated by experimental science, Ray decided to make chemistry his career, as he recognized that his country's future would greatly depend on his progress in science. His passion for experimentation led him to set up a miniature chemistry laboratory at a classmate's lodgings and reproducing some of Pedler's demonstrations; on one occasion, he narrowly escaped injury when a faulty apparatus exploded violently. He passed the FA exam in 1881 with a second division, and was admitted to the BA (B-course) degree of the University of Calcutta as a chemistry student, with a view towards pursuing higher studies in the field. Having learnt Latin and French in addition to achieving a "fair mastery" of Sanskrit, a compulsory subject at the FA level, Ray applied for a Gilchrist Prize Scholarship while studying for his BA examination; the scholarship required a knowledge of at least four languages. After an all-India competitive examination, Ray won one of the two scholarships, and enrolled as a BSc. student at the University of Edinburgh without completing his original degree. He sailed for the United Kingdom in August 1882, aged 21.

=== Student in Britain (1882–1888) ===
At Edinburgh, Ray began his chemistry studies under Alexander Crum Brown and his demonstrator John Gibson, a former student of Brown's who had also studied under Robert Bunsen at the University of Heidelberg. He received his BSc. in 1885. During his student years at Edinburgh, Ray continued to nurture his strong interests in history and political science, reading works by prominent authors including Rousselet's L'Inde des Rajas, Lanoye's L'Inde contemporaine, Revue dex deux mondes. He also read Fawcett's book on political economy and Essays on Indian Finance. In 1885, he entered an essay competition held by the university for the best essay on "India before and after the Mutiny." His submission, which was strongly critical of the British Raj and warned the British government of the consequences of its reactionary attitudes, was nonetheless assessed as one of the best entries and was highly praised by William Muir, the recently appointed Principal of the university and a former lieutenant-governor of the North-Western Provinces in India. Ray's essay was widely publicised in Britain, with The Scotsman observing "It contains information in reference to India which will not be found elsewhere, and is deserving of the utmost notice." A copy of the paper was read by the distinguished orator and Liberal Member of Parliament for Birmingham John Bright; Bright's sympathetic reply to Ray was published in leading newspapers across Britain under the title "John Bright's Letter to an Indian Student." The following year, Ray published his paper as a booklet entitled "Essay on India," which likewise earned its author wide attention in British political circles.

After obtaining his BSc degree, Ray embarked on his doctoral studies. Although his thesis advisor Crum Brown was an organic chemist, Ray was drawn towards inorganic chemistry at a time when research in the field appeared to be making limited progress compared to organic chemistry. Following an extensive review of available inorganic chemistry literature, Ray decided to explore the specific natures of structural affinities in double salts as the subject of his thesis. Within this area, Ray chose to research metal double sulfates.

For some years, science had recognised numerous double sulfates (then also known as "vitriols") occurred in nature as mineral salts. The natural combination of sulfates of bivalent metals with monovalent metal sulfates in a 1:1 ratio results in the formation of double sulfates chemically distinct from their original constituent species. By the 1850s, a number of double sulfates had been artificially synthesized, including ammonium iron(II) sulfate or "Mohr's salt" by Karl Friedrich Mohr. Some chemists, including one Vohl, subsequently claimed to have isolated numerous double-double and multiple-double sulfates including supposed "triple-double," and "quadruple-double" structures. These were purportedly the result of two double sulfates of Type I (differing in the bivalent metal Mb) combining in definite integral proportions to yield new molecular double salts. Others who had attempted to reproduce those experiments reported their inability to do so. Prior to Ray's taking up the problem, in 1886, Percival Spencer Umfreville Pickering and Emily Aston had concluded in their paper that double-double and higher-order sulfate salts did not exist as definite structures, deeming Vohl's experimental findings inexplicable. While Ray noted such findings placed Vohl's research in doubt, he reasoned "the position was unclear and further research was called for."

Ray was awarded the Hope Prize which allowed him to work on his research for a further period of one year after completion of his doctorate. His thesis title was "Conjugated Sulphates of the Copper-magnesium Group: A Study of Isomorphous Mixtures and Molecular Combinations". While a student he was elected vice-president of the University of Edinburgh Chemical Society in 1888.

== Career ==
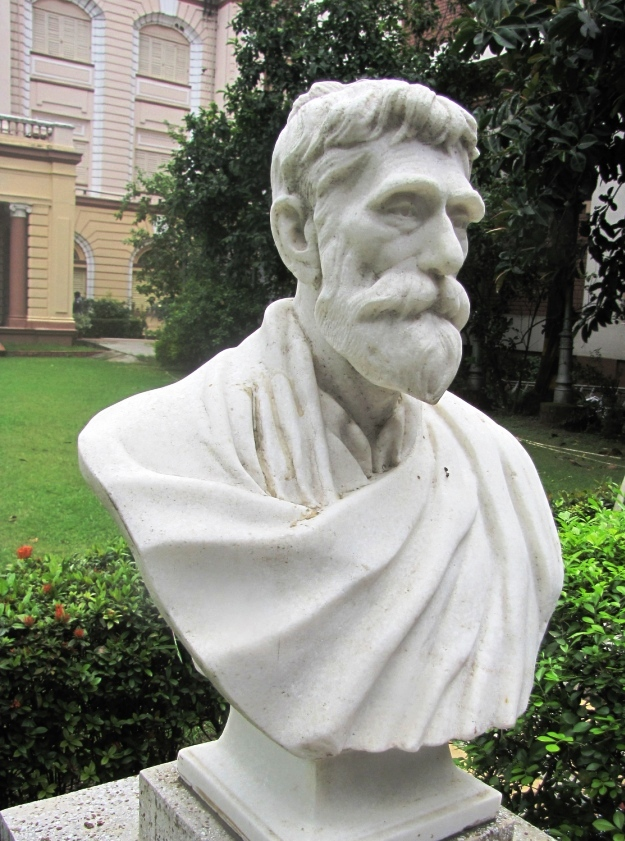
Bust of Prafulla Chandra Ray which is placed in the garden of Birla Industrial & Technological Museum, Kolkata

=== Scientific research ===
==== Mercurous nitrite ====
Around 1895 Prafulla Chandra started his work in the field of discovering nitrite chemistry which turned out to be extremely effective. In 1896, he published a paper on preparation of a new stable chemical compound: mercurous nitrite. This work made way for a large number of investigative papers on nitrites and hyponitrites of different metals, and on nitrites of ammonia and organic amines. He and his students had crumbled this field for several years, leading to a long discipline of research laboratories. Prafulla Chandra said that it was a new chapter in life that started with the unanticipated discovery of mercurous nitrite (NOT mercurous nitrate). Prafulla Chandra, in 1896, noticed the formation of a yellow crystalline solid with the reaction of excess mercury and dilute nitric acid. Unfortunately multiple sources wrongly attribute this as mercurous nitrate instead of mercurous nitrite. The ionic reactions involved are

$\ce{2Hg^0 -> Hg2^2+ + 2e^-}$ (Net reaction in presence of excess mercury)

$\ce{NO3^- + 4H^+ + 3e^- -> NO(g) + 2H2O}$

$\ce{NO3^- + 2H^+ + 2e^- -> NO2^- + H2O}$

$\ce{Hg2^2+ + 2NO2^- -> Hg2(NO2)2 (s)}$ (↓) (yellow crystals)

This result was first published in the Journal of the Asiatic Society of Bengal. That was forthwith noticed by Nature magazine on 28 May 1896.Thermodynamically unstable mercurous nitrite survives because of its kinetic stability under the experimental condition of its preparation.

==== Ammonium and alkylammonium nitrites ====
Ammonium nitrite synthesis in pure form through double displacement ammonium between chloride and silver nitrite is one of the notable contributions of P. C. Ray. He proved that the pure ammonium nitrite is indeed stable by bring to pass a lot of experiments and explained then it can be sublimed even at 60 °C without decomposition.

$$\ce{NH4Cl + AgNO2 -> NH4NO2 + AgCl}$$

On a conference of the Chemical Society in London, he submitted the result. Nobel laureate William Ramsay congratulated him for his achievement. On 15 August 1912 Nature magazine published the news of 'ammonium nitrite in tangible form' and the determination of the vapour density of 'this very fugitive salt'. The Journal of Chemical Society, London published the experimental details in the same year.

He prepared a lot of such compounds by double displacement. After that he worked on mercury alkyl- and mercury alkyl aryl-ammonium nitrites.

$$\ce{RNH3Cl + AgNO2 -> RNH3NO2 + AgCl}$$

He started a new Indian School of Chemistry in 1924. Ray was president of the 1920 session of the Indian Science Congress.

He was a synthetic Inorganic chemist with active research in organic molecules and reactions more specifically to thio-organic compounds. The initial work that made him famous was based on the chemistry of inorganic and organic nitrites, he was regarded as "Master of Nitrites". British Chemist, Henry H. Armstrong stated: 'The way in which you have gradually made yourself "master of nitrites" is very interesting and the fact that you have established that as a class they are far from being the unstable bodies, chemists had supposed, is an important addition to our knowledge.' Prafulla Chandra retired from the Presidency College in 1916, and joined the Calcutta University College of Science (also known as Rajabazar Science College) as its first "Palit Professor of Chemistry", a chair named after Taraknath Palit. Here also he got a dedicated team and he started working on compounds of gold, platinum, iridium etc. with mercaptyl radicals and organic sulphides. A number of papers were published on this work in the Journal of the Indian Chemical Society.

In 1936, at the age of 75, he retired from active service and became professor emeritus. Long before that, on the completion of his 60th year in 1921, he made a free gift of his entire salary to the Calcutta University from that date onward, to be spent for the furtherance of chemical research, and the development of the Department of Chemistry in the University College of Science.

He had written 107 papers in all branches of Chemistry by 1920.

== "Revolutionary in the garb of a Scientist" ==
P C Ray was a staunch nationalist who had observed the deterioration that Indian society had undergone due to suppression by the British. He was sympathetic towards the revolutionaries and would make arrangements for their shelter and food at his factories. After his death, many revolutionaries and his colleagues mentioned about his indirect support and help in manufacturing explosives. The government records of that time mention him as a "Revolutionary in the garb of a Scientist.

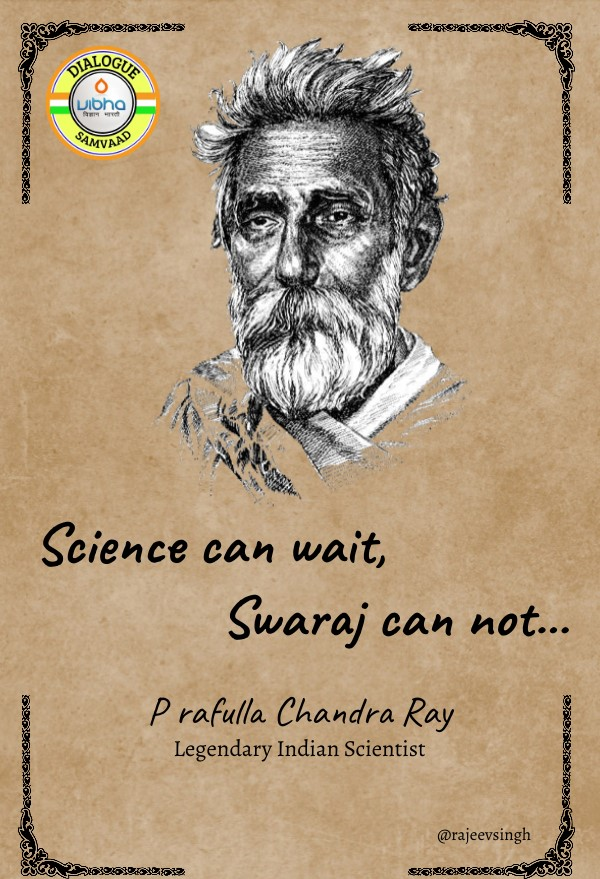

=== Literary works and interests ===
He contributed articles in Bengali to many monthly magazines, particularly on scientific topics. He published the first volume of his autobiography Life and Experience of a Bengali Chemist in 1932, and dedicated it to the youth of India. The second volume of this work was issued in 1935.

In 1902, he published the first volume of A History of Hindu Chemistry from the Earliest Times to the Middle of Sixteenth Century. The second volume was published in 1909. The work was result of many years' search through ancient Sanskrit manuscripts and through works of orientalists.

He donated money regularly towards welfare of Sadharan Brahmo Samaj, Brahmo Girls' School and Indian Chemical Society. In 1922, he donated money to establish Nagarjuna Prize to be awarded for the best work in chemistry. In 1937, another award, named after Ashutosh Mukherjee, to be awarded for the best work in zoology or botany, was established from his donation.

== Recognition and honours ==
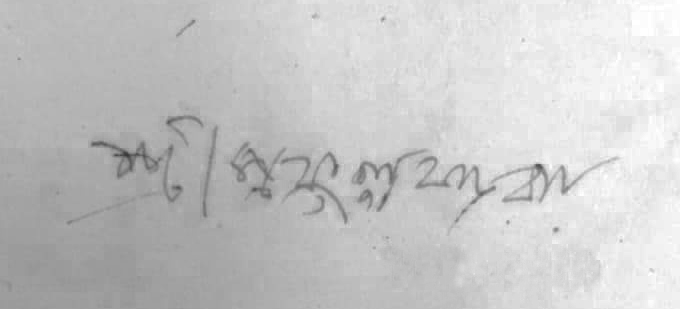
Signature of Acharya Prafulla Chandra Ray

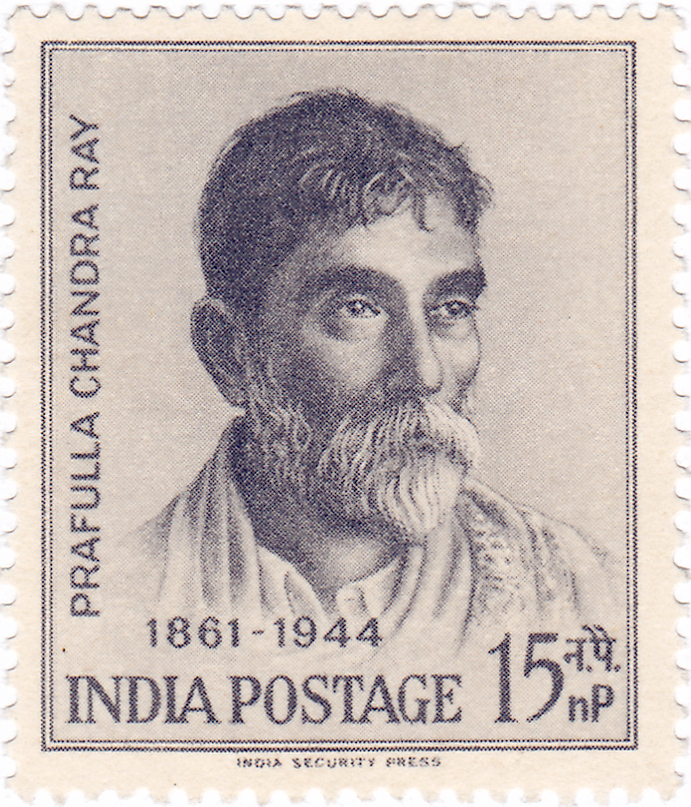
Ray on a 1961 stamp of India

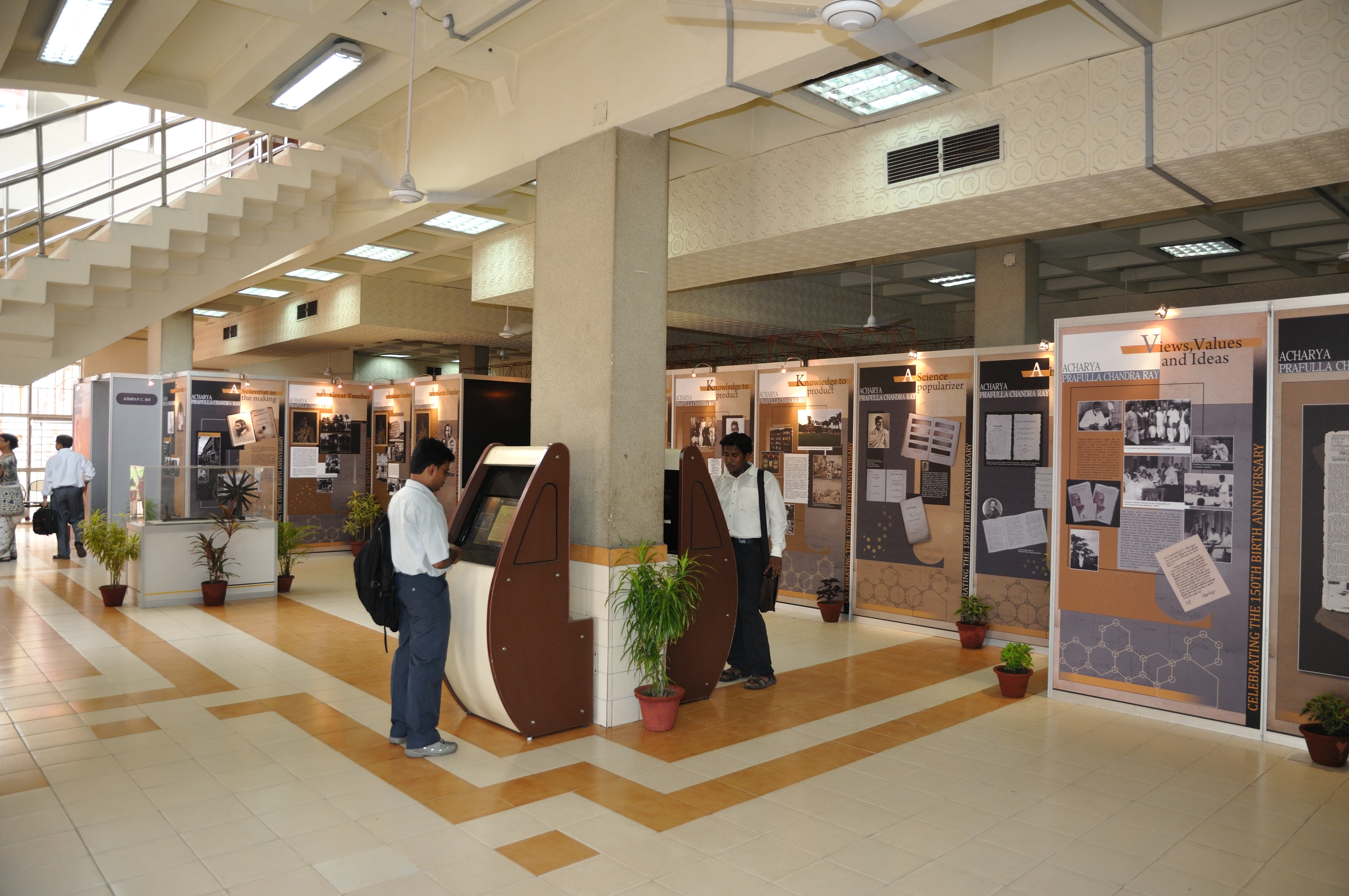
An exhibition on Prafulla Chandra Ray was held at the Science City, Kolkata on his 150th birth anniversary (2 August 2011).

=== Honours and orders ===
- Companion of the Order of the Indian Empire (CIE; 1912 Birthday Honours list)
- Knight Bachelor (1919 New Year Honours list)

=== Academic honours and fellowships ===
- Faraday Gold Medal of the University of Edinburgh (1887)
- Fellow of the Royal Asiatic Society of Bengal (FRASB)
- Fellow of the Chemical Society (FCS; 1902)
- Honorary Member of the Deutsche Akademie, Munich (1919)
- Foundation Fellow of the National Institute of Sciences of India (FNI; 1935)
- Fellow of the Indian Association for the Cultivation of Science (FIAS; 1943)

=== Honorary doctorates ===
- Honorary Doctor of Philosophy degree from the University of Calcutta (1908).
- Honorary D.Sc. degree from Durham University (1912)
- Honorary D.Sc. degree from Banaras Hindu University (1920)
- Honorary D.Sc. degree from the University of Dhaka (1920 and 28 July 1936)
- Honorary D.Sc. degree from the University of Allahabad (1937)

=== Other ===
- Felicitated by the Corporation of Calcutta on his 70th birthday (1932)
- Felicitated by the Corporation of Karachi (1933)
- Title of Jnanabaridi from Korotia College, Mymensingh (now the Government Saadat College) (1936)
- Felicitated by the Corporation of Calcutta on his 80th birthday (1941)
- Chemical Landmark Plaque of the Royal Society of Chemistry (RSC), the first to be situated outside Europe (2011).
- Indian filmmaker Harisadhan Dasgupta made Acharya Prafulla Chandra Ray, a documentary film about the chemist in 1961.

== Bibliography ==
- — (1886). Essays on India. Edinburgh: University of Edinburgh.
- — (1895). Chemical Research at the Presidency College, Calcutta. Calcutta: Hare Press. (reprinted 1897)
- — (1902). Saral Prani Bijnan (Simple Science). Calcutta: Cherry Press.
- — (1902). A History of Hindu Chemistry, Volume I. Calcutta: Bengal Chemical and Pharmaceutical Works.
- — (1909). A History of Hindu Chemistry, Volume II. Calcutta: Bengal Chemical and Pharmaceutical Works.
  For a complete list of his published scientific papers, see his obituary in the Journal of the Indian Chemical Society.

== See also ==
- Government P.C. College, Bagerhat
- Acharya Prafulla Chandra College
