= A History of Hindu Chemistry =

Nonfiction book

A History of Hindu Chemistry is a two-volume book authored by Prafulla Chandra Ray, who was Professor of Chemistry at Presidency College, Kolkata, and published in the first decade of the twentieth century. Volume 1 was published in 1902 and Volume 2 in 1909. Both volumes were published by Williams and Norgate, London. The full title of the book runs as follows: A History of Hindu Chemistry from the Earliest Times to the Middle of the Sixteenth Century AD with Sanskrit Texts, Variants, Translation and Illustrations. Both volumes are available for free download from Internet Archive.

In contemporaneous review of Volume 1 of the book that appeared in the Nature magazine, the reviewer has summed up his review thus: "Dr Ray has ably carried out his task of proving that the ancient lore of the Hindus are far in advance of the rest of the world, China excepted."

== Contents ==
Volume 1 begins with a 79-page introduction divided into six chapters which respectively deal with the alchemical ideas in the Vedas, the Ayurvedic period, the transitional period, the tantric period, the iatrochemical period and the indebtedness of the Arabians to India. The Hindu chemistry of these periods are further elaborated in Volume 1 and also in Volume 2. Both volumes contain extracts and translation of Sanskrit texts dealing with chemistry.
