= Gray - Saint-Adrien Aerodrome =

Airport in Gray, Haute-Saone, France

Coordinates: 47.4322°N 5.6214°E

Gray-Saint Adrien Aerodrome
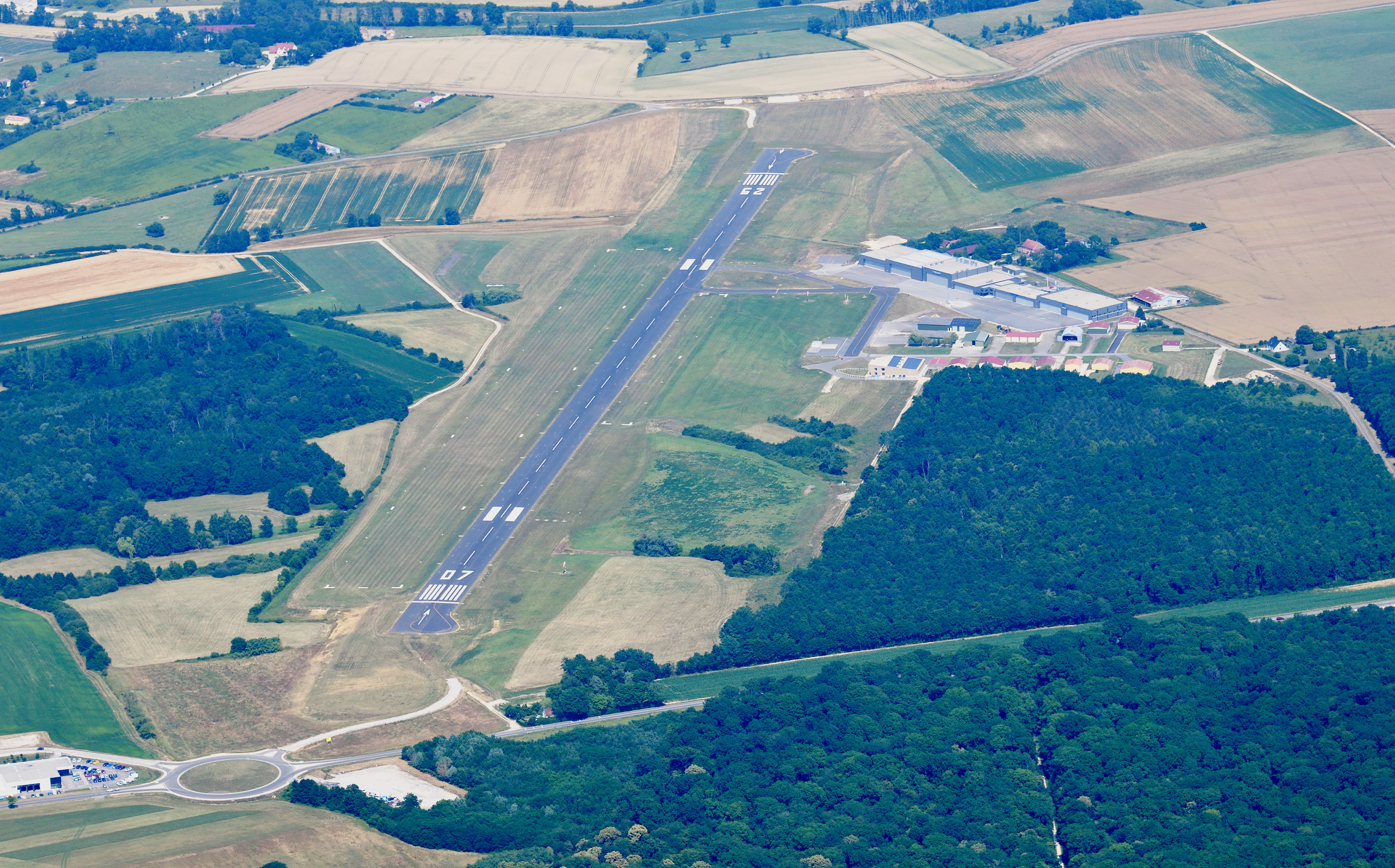
- IATA: none; ICAO: LFEV

Summary
- Airport type: Public
- Location: Gray, Haute-Saone, France
- Interactive map of Gray-Saint Adrien Aerodrome

L'aérodrome de Gray - Saint-Adrien (ICAO: LFEV) is a civilian aerodrome, open to public air traffic (CAP), located 2.5 km southeast of Gray in the Haute-Saône department in the Bourgogne-Franche-Comté region, France.

== History ==
On 8 September 1912, an accident occurred at the aerodrome during an air show. Aviator Pierre Béard failed to gain altitude and crashed into the crowd, killing four people. A monument has honored their memory since 1913.

== Installations ==
=== Runway(s) ===
The main runway was extended again from 1,025 meters to 1,265 meters and widened from 23 meters to 30 meters in 2024.

== See also ==
- Aéro-club
- Direction générale de l'Aviation civile
- Liste des aérodromes français
