= William Christopher Wordsworth =

British academic (1878–1950)

- Born: 1878
- Died: 12 December 1950 (aged 71–72); Alkham, Kent
- Education: Aberystwyth University; Jesus College, Oxford

William Christopher Wordsworth CIE (1878 – 12 December 1950) was a British academic and journalist in India.

== Life ==
Wordsworth was educated at the University College of Wales, Aberystwyth and Jesus College, Oxford. In 1905, he was appointed as a lecturer at St John's College, Battersea before joining the Indian Educational Service in 1907. University was professor of political economy at the Presidency College in Calcutta before becoming an assistant director of public instruction in Bengal, though Wordsworth returned to the Presidency College as principal in 1915. In 1917, he became director of public instruction. After his retirement, Wordsworth joined The Statesman, becoming assistant editor and also acting as the Calcutta correspondent for The Times. He was appointed a Companion of the Order of the Indian Empire. Wordsworth died at Alkham, Kent on 12 December 1950, not long after returning to England.
