= Alexander Pedler =

British chemist

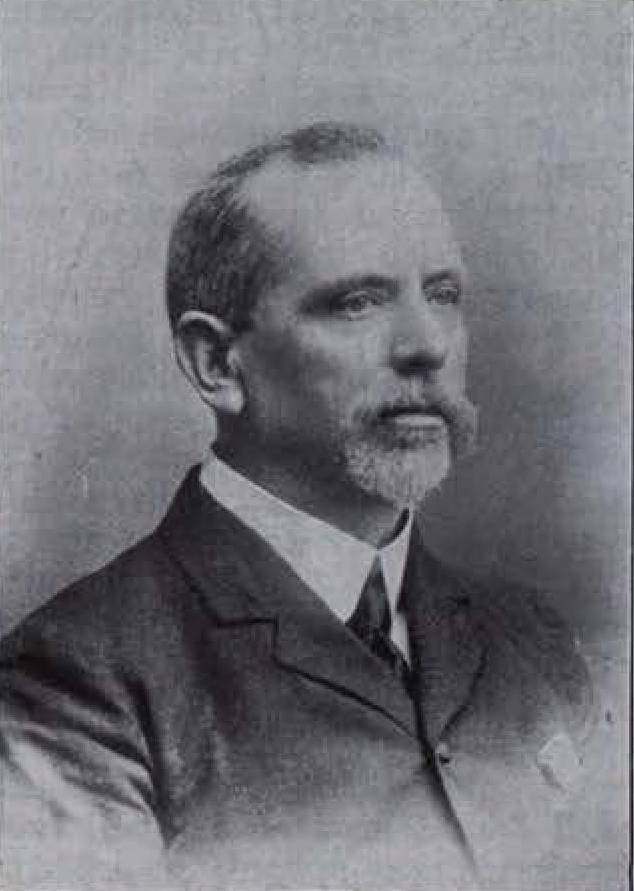
Portrait c. 1907

Sir Alexander Pedler CIE FRS (21 May 1849 – 13 May 1918) was a British civil servant and chemist who worked in the Presidency College, Calcutta where he influenced early studies in chemistry in India by working with pioneer scientists like Prafulla Chandra Ray. He helped found the Indian Association for the Cultivation of Science in Calcutta which in its early days was involved in reaching out to lay citizens interested in science.

== Biography ==
Pedler was the son of George Stanbury Pedler, a pharmacist on Fleet Street, and Hannah Rideal. He was privately schooled and educated at the City of London School. With a Bell scholarship he studied at the laboratory of the Pharmaceutical Society of Great Britain from 1866. He worked as a chemical assistant at the Royal Institution, working with Herbert McLeod, Edward Frankland, and Norman Lockyer. He worked with Lockyer examining the spectra from solar prominences in Sicily when the latter discovered helium on the earth in 1868. He also was involved in studies on chiral isomers of valeric acid with Frankland. In 1869 he visited America and on return he was a chemical examiner at the Department of Science and Art at the Royal College of Chemistry. He became a Fellow of the Chemical Society in 1870. After Herbert McLeod moved to the newly established Royal Indian Engineering College, Coopers Hill, Pedler succeeded him. On the recommendation of Edward Frankland he was offered a chair of chemistry at the Presidency College in Calcutta.

Pedler went to India aged 24 and became principal at the Presidency College, Calcutta in 1896 and also served as meteorological reporter to the Bengal Government in 1889. His major influence on Indian science was as professor of chemistry in Presidency College, then affiliated with the University of Calcutta where his lectures in the FA course first attracted Prafulla Chandra Ray to study chemistry. Following his experience at the British Association he helped found the Indian Association for the Cultivation of Science which reached out to laypersons interested in science. He also gave lectures at the Asiatic Society. Pedler was involved in chemical applications of value to India, he studied the toxins of cobra venom, corrosion of lead linings used in tea storage chests, analyzed water supplies in Calcutta and examined coal gas. He was principal of Presidency College four times from 1887, 1887–1889, again in 1889 and from 1896–1897. In 1901 he was Director of Public Instruction in Bengal, and was created a Companion of the Order of the Indian Empire (CIE) in November 1901. He was knighted in 1906 shortly after retirement. He moved to London where he lived at Stanhope Gardens. Along with Lockyer he helped establish the British Science Guild in 1907 and served as its honorary secretary.

Pedler married Elizabeth Margaret, daughter of C.K. Schmidt of Frankfurt in 1878. Elizabeth died in 1896 and in 1905 he married Mabel, daughter of William Warburton. He had no children from either marriage. He was elected a Fellow of the Royal Society in 1892. He died suddenly while attending a Committee meeting at the Ministry of Munitions on 13 May 1918. The Alexander Pedler Lecture is given annually under the auspices of the British Association in memory of his name.
