= F. J. Friend-Pereira =

F. J. Friend-Pereira (13 July 1907 – 1957) was an Anglo-Indian academic and author. From 1955 until his death in 1957 he was the Principal of Presidency College in Kolkata.

== Academic career ==
F. J. Friend-Pereira read English at Christ's College, Cambridge, where he was scholar and prizeman. He received the Diplôme d'Hautes Études from Aix-Marseilles and studied philosophy at the Catholic University of Leuven. From 1938 to 1947 he was a Professor of English in the University of Calcutta and from 12 August 1947 until 1955 he was Principal of Maulana Azad College (then Islamia College). From 1955 until his death in 1957 Friend-Pereira was Principal of Presidency College in Calcutta. In addition he was a member of the Board of Studies for English, Latin and French of the University of Calcutta, President of the Hindu School Managing Committee, a member of the University of Calcutta Senate and of the West Bengal Board of Anglo-Indian Education.

== Publications ==
F. J. Friend-Pereira published volumes of poetry including Mind's Mirror in 1941. - 224k -. He also contributed regularly to journals in India including the Modern Review, and the New Review. He translated works on the Islamic philosopher Avicenna as well as poetry from French and Latin. He corresponded with R. P. Blackmur and Sri Aurobindo on literary matters.
