= Malabika Sarkar =

Indian academic administrator

3rd Vice Chancellor of Ashoka University
- In office 1 August 2019 – 10 November 2022
- Preceded by: Prof. Pratap Bhanu Mehta
- Succeeded by: Prof. Somak Raychaudhury

2nd Vice Chancellor of Presidency University, Kolkata
- In office October 2011 – May 2014
- Preceded by: Prof. Amita Chatterjee
- Succeeded by: Prof. Anuradha Lohia

Personal details
- Born: 15 August 1948 (age 77)

Malabika Sarkar is an Indian academic, former Vice-Chancellor of Ashoka University, , former Vice-Chancellor of Presidency University, Kolkata and Mentor and Officiating Vice-Chancellor of TCG CREST. She was the first Dean of Faculty & Research at Ashoka and was the Principal Academic Advisor before succeeding Pratap Bhanu Mehta to become the 3rd Vice-Chancellor. She is a professor of English Literature and specializes in John Milton, with an added interest in the History of Science. Her book Cosmos and Character in Paradise Lost was published by Palgrave Macmillan in June 2012. She handed over the charge of Vice-Chancellorship of Ashoka University to Indian Astrophysicist Somak Raychaudhury on 1 January 2023. During her tenure, Sarkar made several appearances in the media, writing op-eds and giving one-on-one interviews to key publications. In particular, she took up the cause of women and batted for leadership roles for women in academia, becoming a national voice opining the same. In doing so, she helped enhance Ashoka's reputation on the national stage.

== Biography ==
She is an alumna of Presidency College (then under the University of Calcutta), where she was a student of English literature. She went on to complete her B.A. and M.A. from New Hall, Cambridge University. Later a graduate student at Clare Hall, she returned to Clare Hall, Cambridge University, as visiting fellow in 2002–2003 and in 2003 was elected to a life membership. She is a Fellow of the English Association (FEA), U.K..

Sarkar was earlier professor of English at Jadavpur University, Kolkata, head of the Department of English from 1999-2001, a member of the Jadavpur University Council from 1980-1985, and member of various academic bodies of the University. She was also a member of the University Grants Commission Panel of Experts in English and Foreign Languages and a panel member of NAAC.

Sarkar has presented her work at several conferences in the U.K. and North America. She combines her interest in Milton and the Renaissance with another area of interest, Romantic Studies. She is the founder President of the Centre for Studies in Romantic Literature and continues to direct its international conferences. Her publications in this area include Moneta’s Veil: Essays on 19th Century Literature (Pearson-Longman, 2010). She is on the international advisory board of the journal European Romantic Review published by Routledge. Her many publications include her article on "The Magic of Shakespeare’s Sonnets", first published in Renaissance Studies (U.K., 1998), which was reprinted in Shakespeare Criticism Yearbook 1998 (Gale Group, USA).

Sarkar is now a member of the Presidency University Governing Board.

She is also president of the Women's Coordinating Council (WCC), West Bengal, the apex women's organization in the state with representatives from more than 74 social welfare organizations.

== Publications ==
- Moneta's Veil : Essays in Nineteenth Century Literature, 2009
- Cosmos and character in Paradise Lost, 2011

Academic offices
Preceded by Amita Chatterjee	Vice-Chancellor of Presidency University, Kolkata; 2011–2014	Succeeded by Anuradha Lohia
Preceded by Pratap Bhanu Mehta	Vice-Chancellor of Ashoka University; 2019–2022	Succeeded by Somak Raychaudhury
