= Amita Chatterjee =

Indian philosopher of science and logician (born 1950)

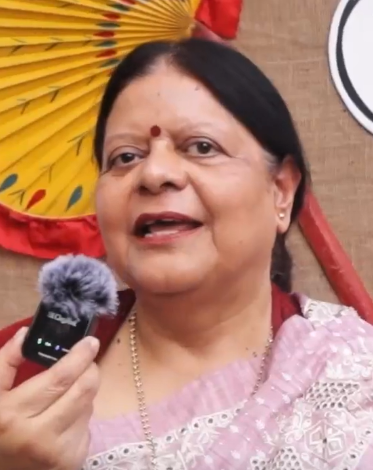
- Chatterjee in 2025

1st Vice-Chancellor of Presidency University
- In office 5 October 2010 – 5 October 2011
- Chancellor: Governor of West Bengal
- Governor: M.K. Narayanan; D. Y. Patil (additional charge); Keshari Nath Tripathi; Jagdeep Dhankhar
- Succeeded by: Prof. Malabika Sarkar

2nd Vice-President of International Union of History and Philosophy of Science
- In office 2016–2019

Personal details
- Born: 13 September 1950 (age 76)
- Education: Presidency College, Kolkata, University of Calcutta

Amita Chatterjee (born 13 September 1950) is a philosopher of science and logician, first vice-chancellor of Presidency University Kolkata and is professor emerita at the School of Cognitive Science of Jadavpur University in Kolkata, India. In 2019 her contributions to philosophy were recognized with the publication of a 2-volume festschrift in her honour: Mind and Cognition- An Interdisciplinary Sharing (Essays in Honour of Amita Chatterjee) by Kuntala Bhattacharya, Madhucchanda Sen and Smita Sirker.

== Biography ==
Chatterjee studied at Presidency College, Kolkata and she received her Ph.D. from University of Calcutta She was a professor of philosophy at Jadavpur University from 1979 to 2010. During this time, she co-ordinated the Centre for Cognitive Science at Jadavpur University and was the Head of the Department of Philosophy. From 2010 to 2011, she was the first Vice Chancellor of Presidency University, Kolkata. After this, she returned to Jadavpur University. From 2016 to 2019, she served as Second Vice President of the Division for Logic, Methodology and Philosophy of Science and Technology. She served as editor for numerous academic journals, among them Philosophy East and West, and has been an important member of the Calcutta Logic Circle a group of logicians from mathematics, philosophy and computer science in West Bengal.
