= Library of Gray =

- Bibliothèque municipale de Gray
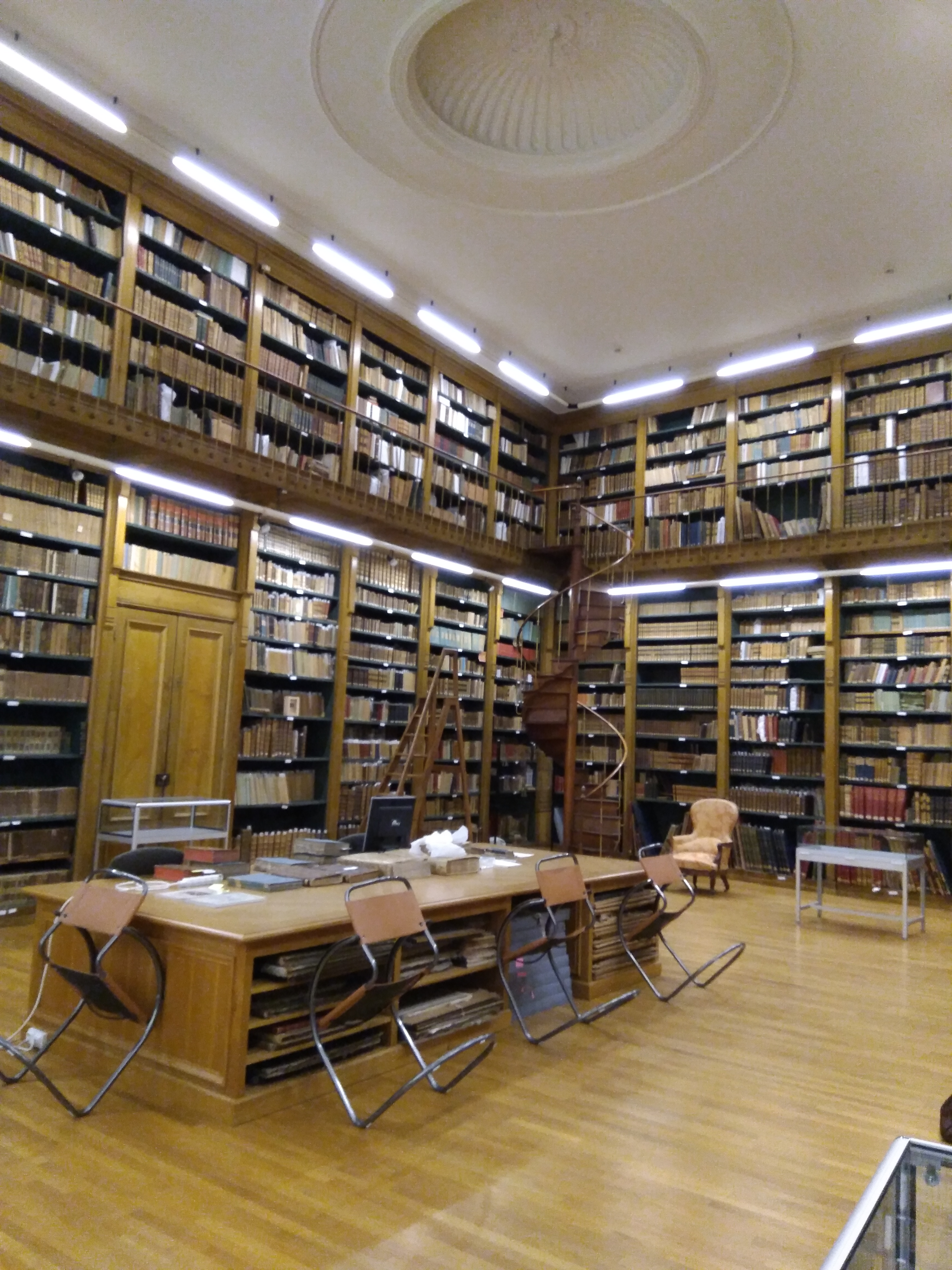
- The old fonds of the library.
- 47.445827°N 5.592569°E
- Location: Gray, France
- Type: Public library
- Established: March 30, 1799 (convent); December 6, 1859 (actual building)

Collection
- Size: 25,000 books (old fonds); 13,000 books (borrowable books)

Other information
- Website: bibliotheque-gray.fr

The Library of Gray was founded in 1799 after the confiscation of the properties of the Catholic Church. The library first opened in an old convent before moving to a proper building adjoining the city hall in 1859. The library is divided into two sections. One section stores only documents that cannot be borrowed and the second contains documents that can be borrowed by the public.

== History ==
The Library of Gray emerges after the French Revolution and the confiscation of the properties of the Catholic Church. From 1792 to 1798, the abbot Lempereur is asked to preserve the documents that comes from the nearby convents. The municipality of Gray requests the executive directorate in order to found and open a new library. The 30 March 1799, the library is founded and inaugurated in the old convent of the cordeliers. Since then, the library is open to the public. This library serves also as a kind of museum because in 1801, the curator enumerated 107 paintings, some of which are now in the Baron-Martin Museum.

=== The Great Library ===
In 1859, the municipality of Gray wants to have a proper building for the library. This new building, adjoining the city hall, is conceived as a sumptuous place with its panelling and its gallery surrounding the hall. The building is achieved in one year. The library is inaugurated the 6 December 1859 and open to the public the 1 January 1860. Since this period the new library is called "the Great Library".

Since then, the library is divided in two parts. At the ground floor, there is the part with modern books that can be borrowed and upstairs, there is the part with old books that cannot be borrowed and can only be read at library.

Nowadays, the modern part contains 13.000 books when the old part contains 25.000 books.

== Collections ==
The old part contains 18 incunabula among which there is a book of Jean Buridan about Aristotle's Ethics (1489), The Consolation of Philosophy by Boethius (1480) and also the Fasciculus temporum by Werner Rolevinck (1495).

The library hosts also many pictures from amateur photographers living in the commune of Gray. Among them, there are Eugène Noir (1855-1904) and Louis Guichard (1866-1934) who were peculiarly active during the Belle-Époque. Books from famous Gray inhabitants are also hosted by the library, like Jean-Baptiste Romé de l'Isle (mineralogist considered as one of the creators of the modern crystallography), Augustin Cournot (mathematician, economist and philosopher) and Edmond Bour (mathematician and engineer).

=== Partnership with Wikimédia France ===
In 2008, Wikimédia France made a partnership with the library of Gray in order to digitize an atlas from 1828 and some engravings of George Anson's voyage around the world.

== Exhibitions ==
Some exhibitions are organized in the library of Gray, especially for the event called Patrimoines écrits en Bourgogne-Franche-Comté.

=== 2017 ===
- Habiter son territoire : espaces intimes, espaces publics : An exhibition about the place of man in a territory, from documents of the library.

=== 2018 ===
- Le travail c'est la santé : An exhibition about the universe of work.

== See also ==
- List of libraries in France
