= Anuradha Lohia =

Indian molecular biologist (Born:1956)

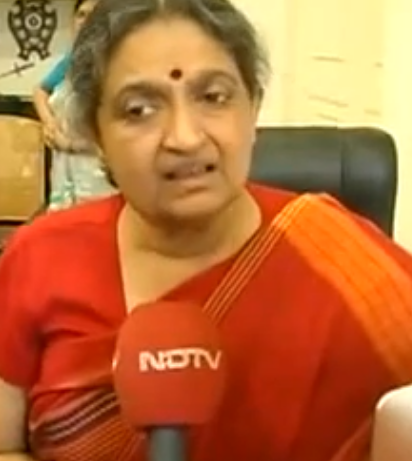
- Lohia, in 2015, being interviewed, by NDTV reporter, while she was gheraoed by students, demanding her resignation.

3rd Vice-Chancellor of Presidency University
- In office 2 May 2014 – 13 June 2023
- Chancellor: Governor of West Bengal
- Governor: M.K. Narayanan; D. Y. Patil (additional charge); Keshari Nath Tripathi; Jagdeep Dhankhar
- Preceded by: Prof. Malabika Sarkar
- Succeeded by: Subhro Kamal Mukherjee (acting)

Personal details
- Born: 11 June 1956 (age 70) Calcutta (now Kolkata), West Bengal
- Education: Presidency College (University of Calcutta); Rajabazar Science College (University of Calcutta); Indian Institute of Chemical Biology

Anuradha Lohia is a leader in scientific research and education in India. She is an eminent molecular biologist who has made seminal discoveries in the field of infectious diseases. During her tenure at Bose Institute, Kolkata, she has collaborated with leading scientists around the world. Prof. Lohia received the prestigious Rockefeller Biotechnology Career fellowship and is an elected Fellow of the Indian Academy of Sciences, Bangalore. In the year 2001, she received the National Award for Young Woman Bioscientist. In recognition of her scientific acumen and leadership, Anuradha was appointed as the first CEO of the Indo-British organisation- Wellcome Trust/DBT India Alliance in Hyderabad, India. She went on to serve as the Vice-Chancellor of Presidency University, Kolkata for 9 years. She is currently the Chairperson of Manovikas Kendra, Kolkata an institute that provides scientifically driven diagnosis and personalised therapies for children with special needs. In addition to her contributions in science and education, Anuradha is deeply committed to promotion of performing arts, having been a classical dance artist herself. She is the Vice Chancellor of the Presidency University.

== Education and career ==
Lohia was a student of the Modern High School for Girls in Calcutta. She completed B.Sc. (Hons) in physiology from Presidency College, University of Calcutta and M.Sc. in physiology from Rajabazar Science College, University of Calcutta. Her PhD in Biochemistry was focussed on Studies on the cell surface of Vibrio cholerae from the Indian Institute of Chemical Biology. She was a visiting scientist at various universities around the world. She did her postdoctoral research in New York University Medical Centre. Lohia was elected a fellow of the Indian Academy of Sciences. She was also awarded the Rockefeller Foundation Biotechnology Career Fellowship (1993-1997), National award for young woman bioscientist (2001, Govt of India); Stree Shakti award and the UNESCO Molecular and Cell Biology network grant. She has been awarded the SHE award for Education from The Telgraph t2, Kolkata in 2025.

Academic offices
Preceded by Malabika Sarkar	Vice-Chancellor of Presidency University, Kolkata since 2014	Succeeded by incumbent
