= Biens nationaux =

Properties confiscated during the French Revolution

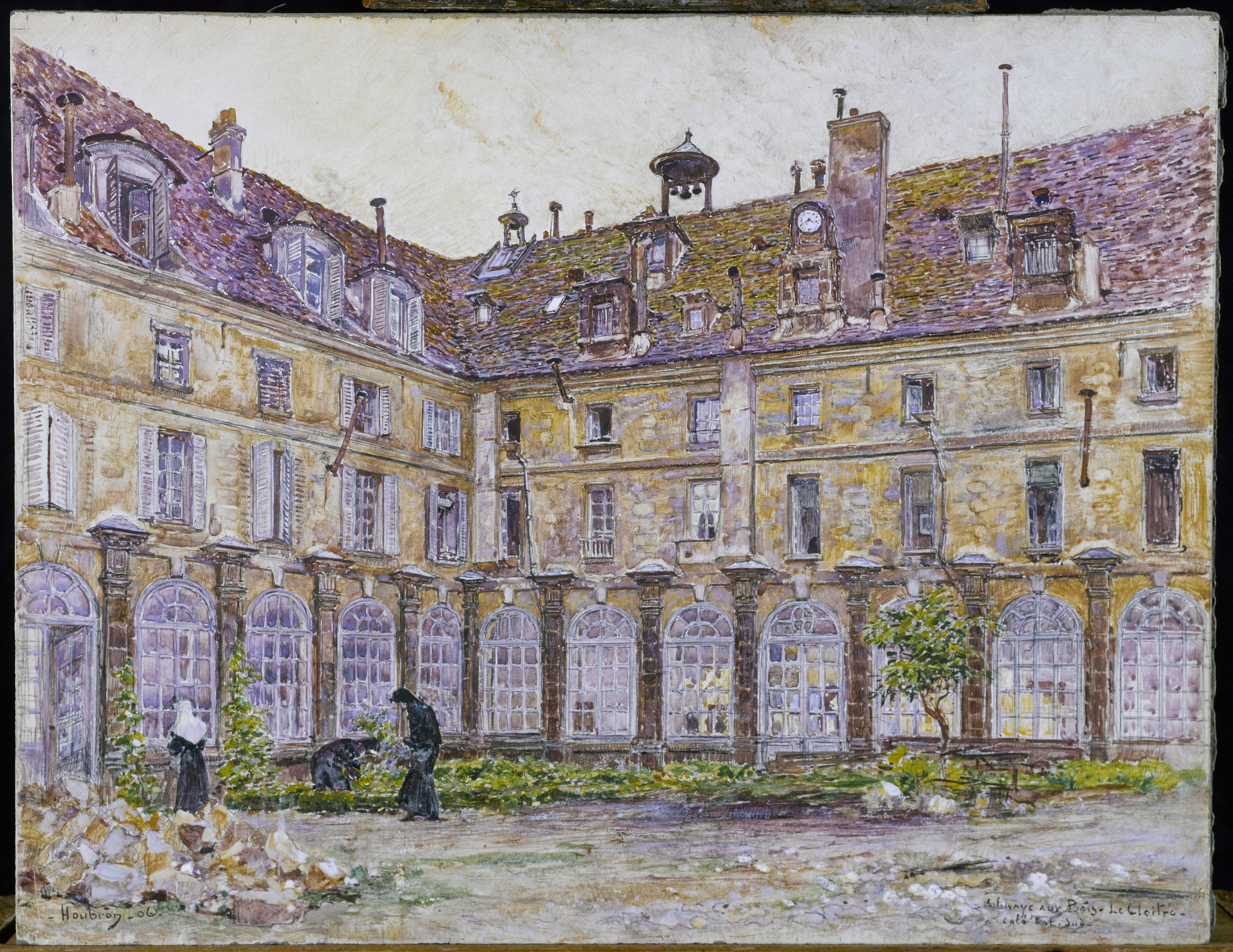
A painting of the Abbaye-aux-Bois, which after being seized by the revolutionary government as biens nationaux, was turned into a prison, before its demolition in 1907.

The biens nationaux were properties confiscated during the French Revolution from the Catholic Church, the monarchy, émigrés, and suspected counter-revolutionaries for "the good of the nation".

Biens means "goods", both in the sense of "objects" and in the sense of "benefits". Nationaux means "of the nation". This can be summarized as "things for the good of the nation", or simply "national goods".

The possessions of the Roman Catholic Church were declared national property by the decree of 2 November 1789. These were sold to resolve the financial crisis that caused the Revolution. Later, the properties of the Crown were given the same treatment.

The concept of national property was later extended to the property of the émigrés, and the suspected counter-revolutionaries, which were confiscated from 30 March 1792, and sold after the decree of 27 July.

== Confiscation of the goods of the clergy ==
A few months into the Revolution, the public purse was all but empty. To amend this fiscal problem, the deputy Talleyrand proposed nationalizing the goods of the clergy. Pursuing the proposal, on 2 November 1789, the Assemblée Nationale voted that all the goods of the clergy "will be placed at the disposal of the nation", declared to be henceforth biens nationaux, national goods, to be put out to bid at auction on behalf of the State.

== New currency ==
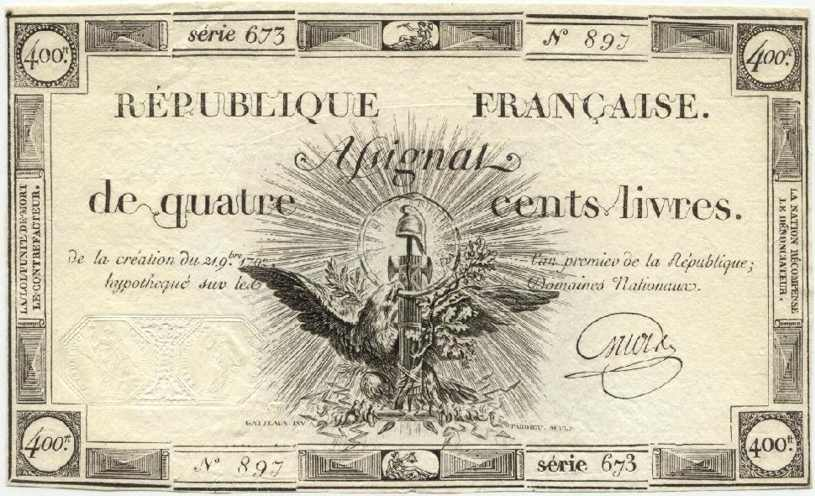
Assignat of 400 livres, issued 24 Sept, 1792, first year of the Republic

This legacy, evaluated to just about 3 billion livres, constituted a substantial improvement for public finance. The disposition of these goods was entrusted to a special office, the Caisse de l'Extraordinaire, which was formed on 19 December 1789.

The difficulty was that the sale of so many biens would take time, at least a year, while the caisses of the State were empty and national bankruptcy appeared to be immediate. Therefore, it was decided to produce, the very same day as the creation of la Caisse de l'Extraordinaire, a type of bonds called assignats. The value of these bills or bonds was based on the estimated value of the clerical properties. The assignats were issued by the National Constituent Assembly.

Initially meant as bonds, the assignats developed into a paper currency used as legal tender.

== Inflation ==
As there was no control over the amount to be printed, the value of the assignats went beyond the limits of the confiscated properties. This caused hyperinflation. In the beginning of 1792, they had lost most of their supposed value.

This hyperinflation was inspired by continual food shortages. Rather than solving the financial problems, the assignats became a cause for food riots. Insecurity continued after the abolition of the monarchy, and the situation got worse with the wars France faced. These circumstances interfered with the completion of good financial policies that would reduce debts. Bills were passed such as the Maximum Price Act (loi du maximum général) of 1793, meant to control price increases.

On 28 December 1793, the Assembly issued the legislation to confiscate the property of individuals regarded as enemies of the Revolution, which included the émigrés and fugitives, hostile priesthood, the deportees, prisoners, those sentenced to death, and the aliens from enemy countries.

When the Directoire came into power in 1795 the Maximum Price Act was lifted. High monetary inflation reemerged and in the next four years Paris was the scene of yet more riots. The assignats were becoming worthless.

France's financial problems were solved during the French Consulate when Napoleon, the First Consul, created the country's new currency, the franc germinal, by the law of 28 March 1803 (loi du 7 Germinal an XI).

== See also ==
- Library of Gray

== Notes ==
- Based on French Wikipedia.
