= Charles Henry Tawney =

British educator and translator (1837–1922)

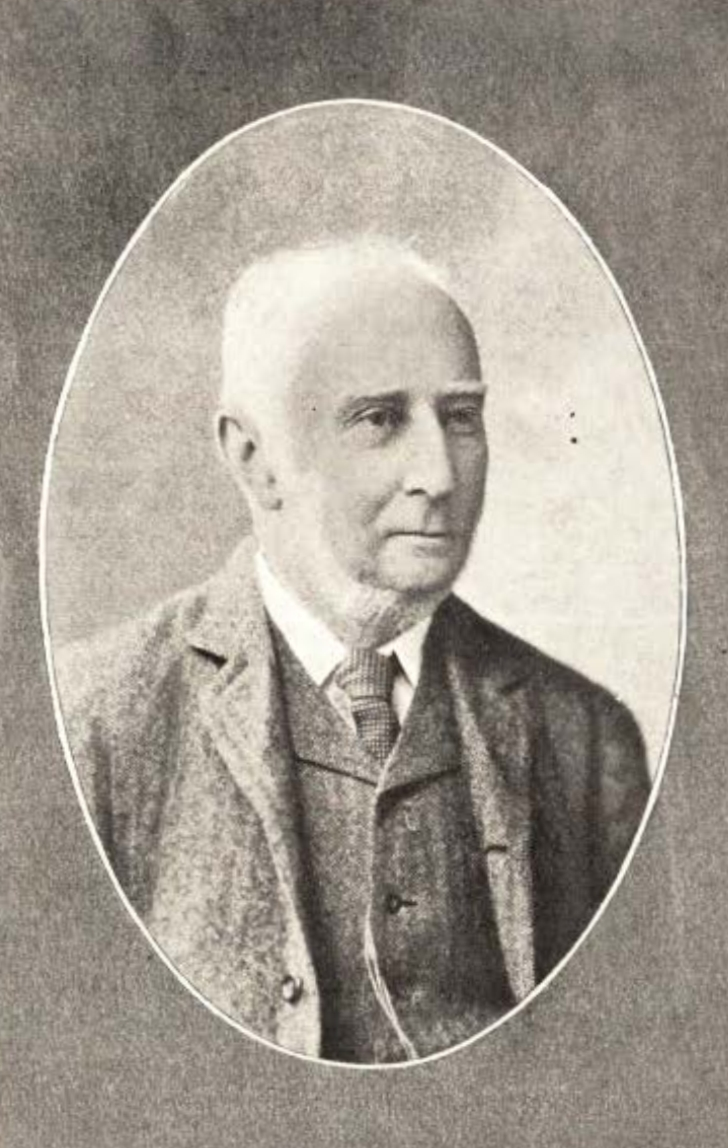
- Born: 26 December 1837
- Died: 29 July 1922 (aged 84)
- Known for: translations of Sanskrit classics

Academic background
- Education: Trinity College, Cambridge

Charles Henry Tawney CIE (26 December 1837 – 29 July 1922) was an English educator and scholar, primarily known for his translations of Sanskrit classics into English. He was fluent in German, Latin, and Greek; and in India also acquired Sanskrit, Hindi, Urdu, and Persian.

== Biography ==
Tawney was the son of Rev. Richard Tawney, and educated at Rugby School and Trinity College, Cambridge; where he was a Cambridge Apostle and worked as a fellow and tutor for four years, until he moved to India for health reasons. He married Constance Catharine Fox in 1867 and had a large family. One of his children, born 30 November 1880 in Calcutta, was Richard Henry Tawney. From 1865 to his retirement in 1892 he held various educational offices, most significantly Principal of Presidency College Calcutta, for much of the period of 1875 to 1892. His translation of Kathasaritsagara was printed by the Asiatic Society of Bengal in a small series called Bibliotheca Indica between 1880 and 1884.

One of the professors of Presidency College during Tawney's tenure was Jagadish Chandra Bose. Initially Tawney, along with the Director of Public Instruction, was reluctant to appoint Bose to the post which in those days was usually reserved for Europeans. Bose worked in a temporary post for the first three years. After this, Tawney, along with the Director of Public Instruction, Sir Alfred Croft, recognized the value of Bose's professorial work and his unyielding principles. Through their efforts Bose's position was made permanent.

After retirement, Tawney was made Librarian of the India Office.

== Translations from Sanskrit ==
Tawney translated the Mālavikāgnimitra of Kālidāsa whose first edition was published in 1875 and second edition in 1891.

His other works include:

- Bhavabhūti: Uttara-rāma-carita (1874) — a play
- Two Centuries of Bhartṛihari (1877) — two collections of ethical and philosophico-religious stanzas (online)
- Somadeva: Kathā Sarit Sāgara (1880-1884) — the massive collection of legends and tales (Vol I online) (Vol II online)
- Kathākoça (1895) — Jain stories (online)
- Merutunga: Prabandhacintāmaṇi (1899-1901) — Jain stories (online)
