= Gray, Haute-Saône =

Gray
- Commune
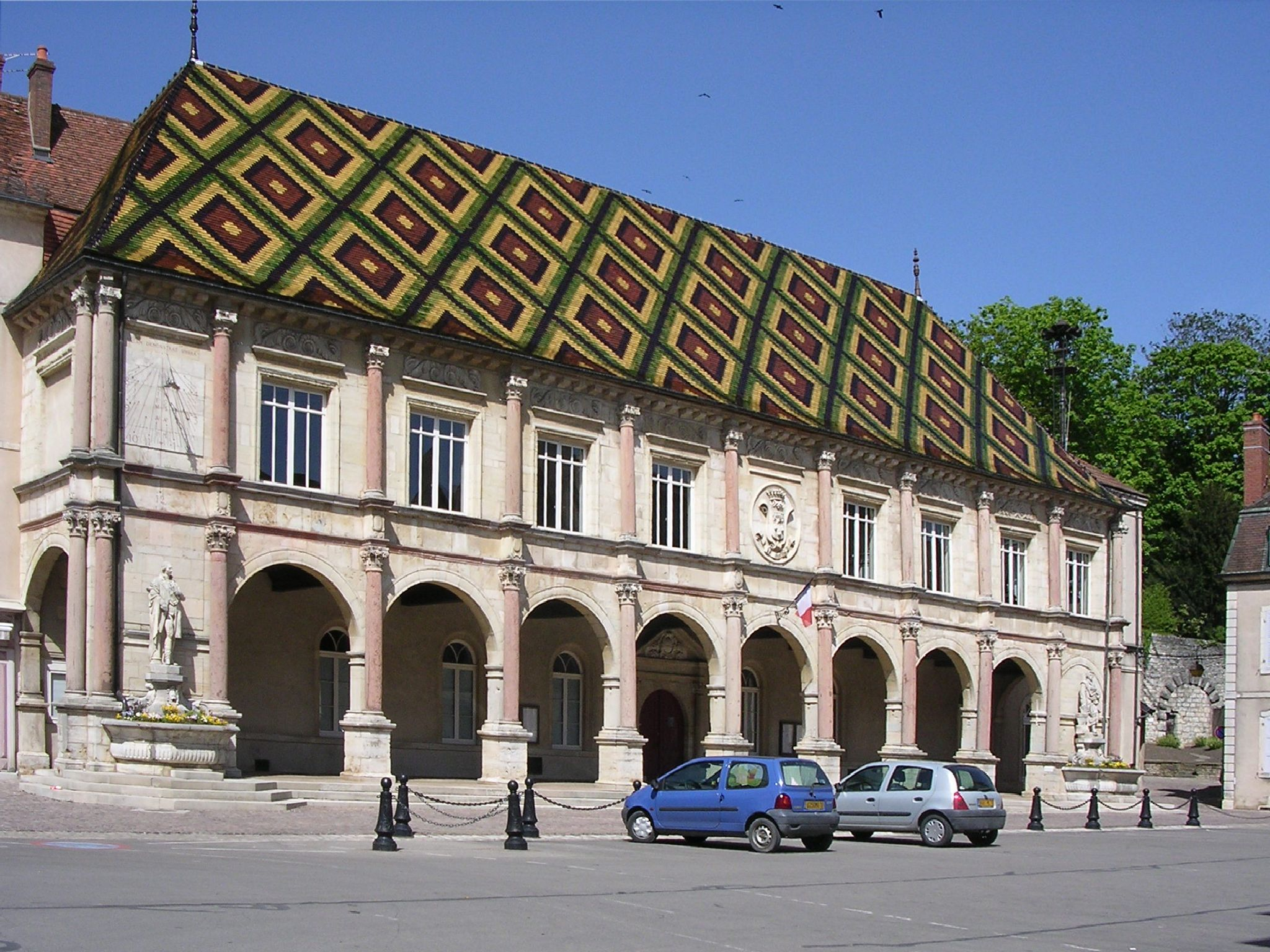
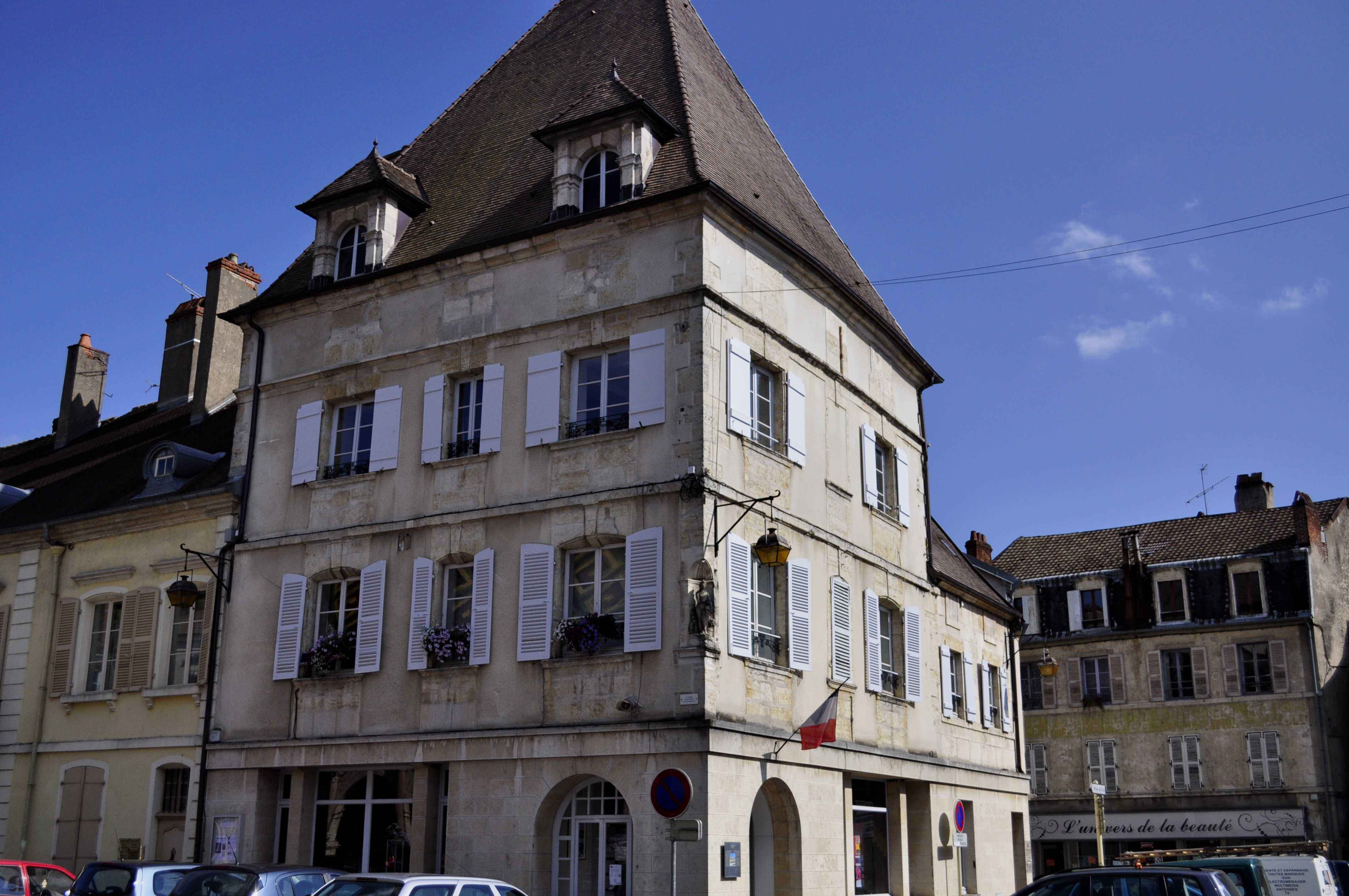
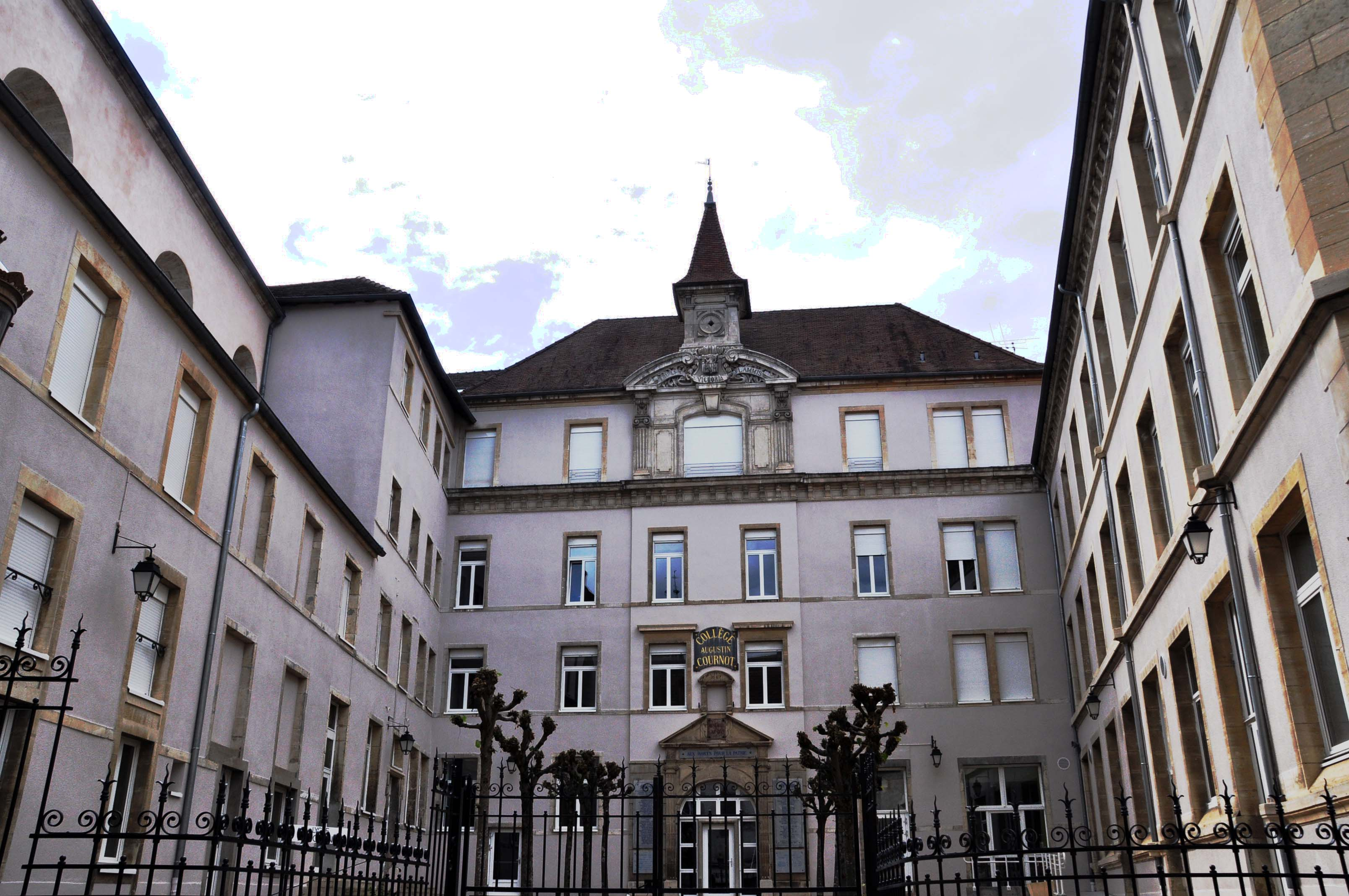
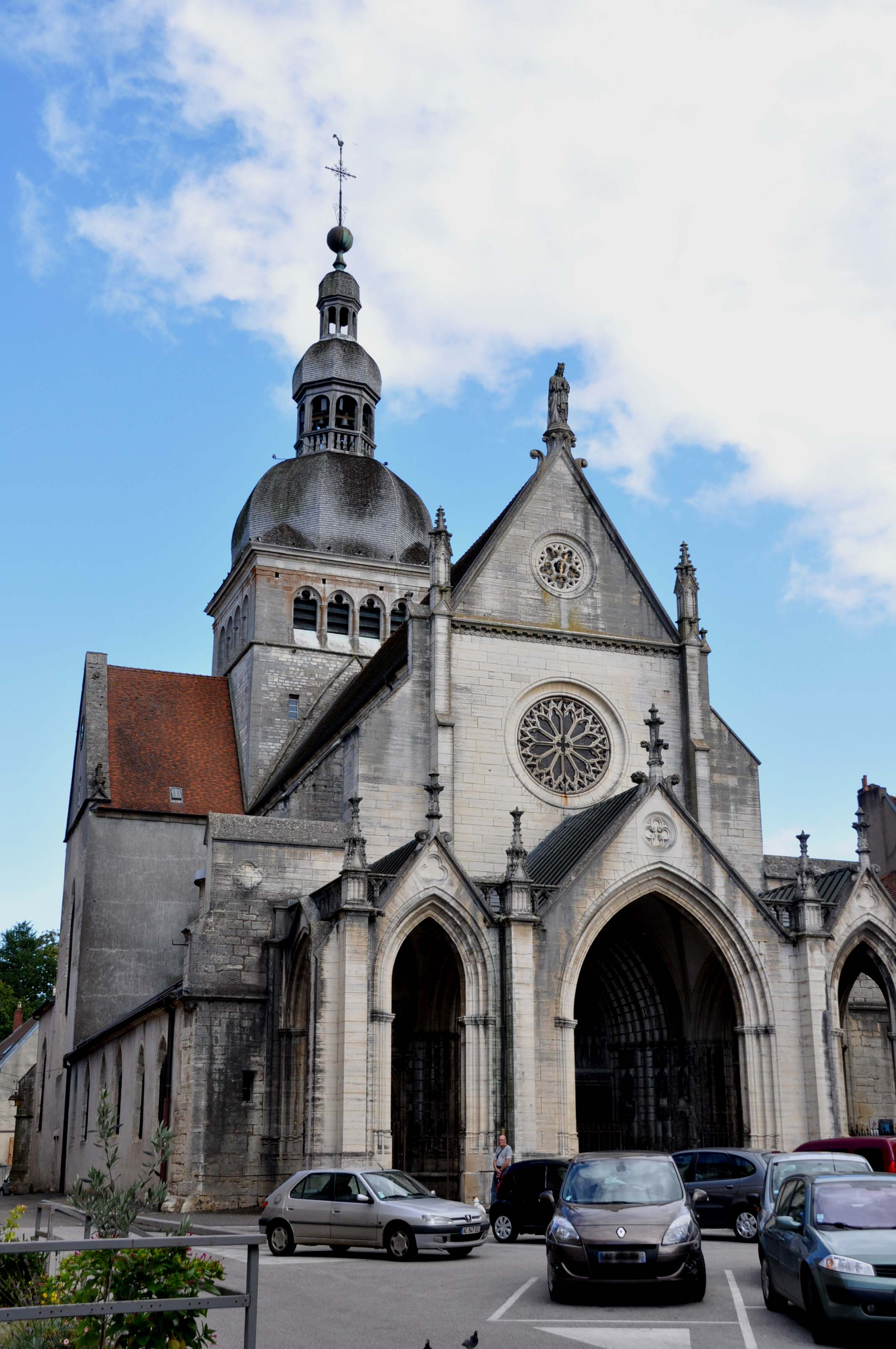
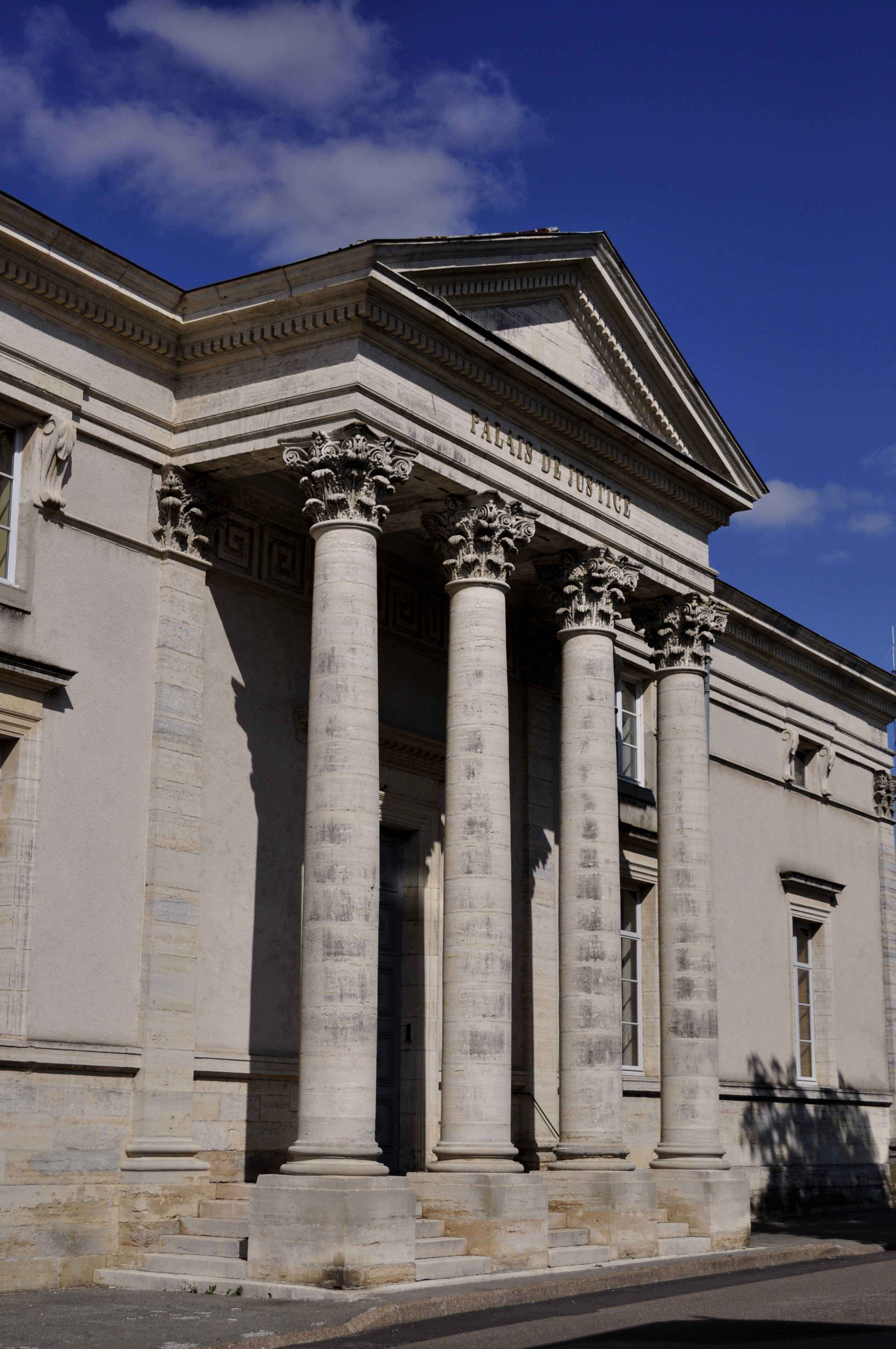
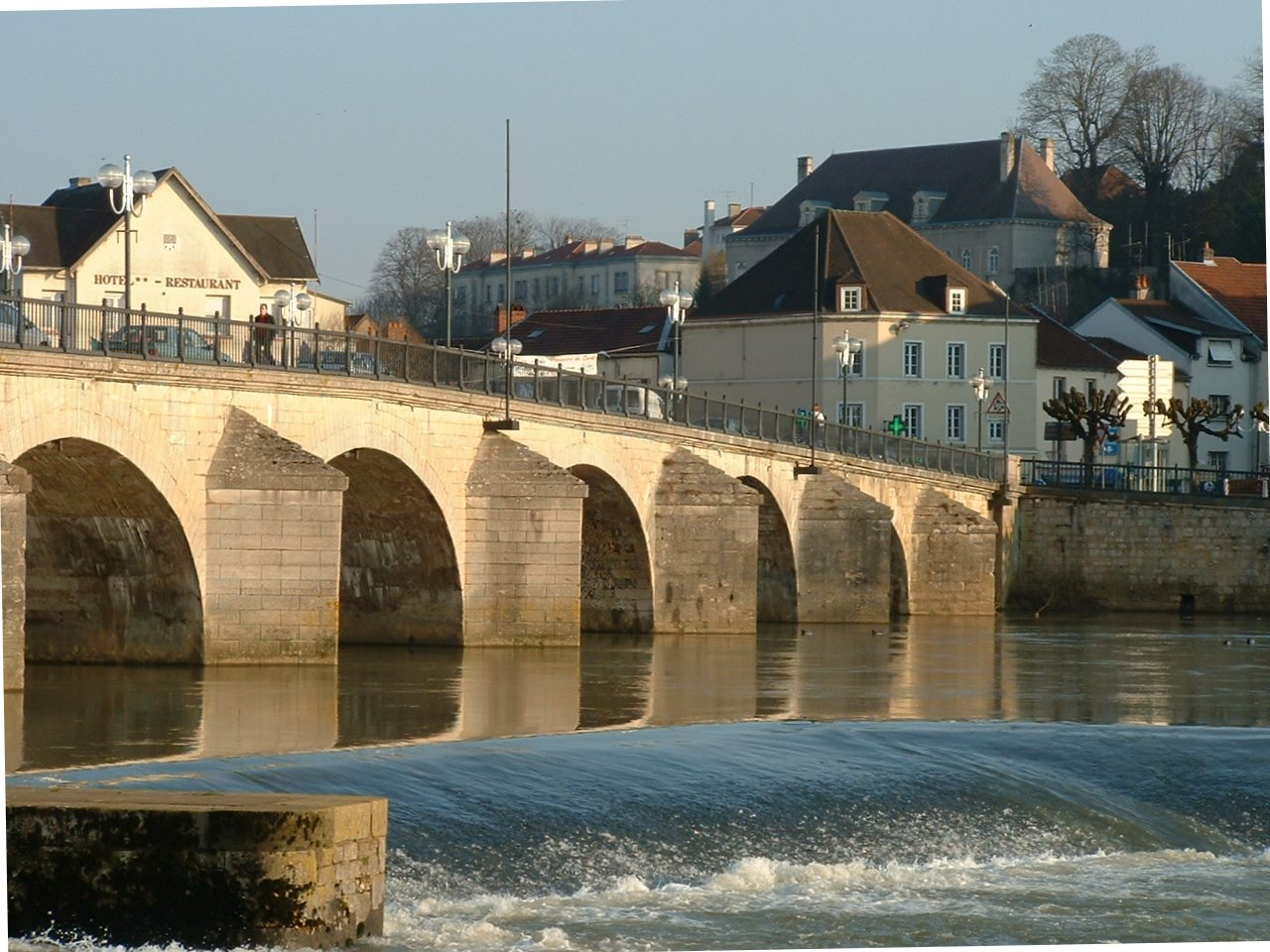

- Coat of arms
- Location of Gray
- Location within France Location within Bourgogne-Franche-Comté
- Coordinates: 47°26′42″N 5°35′32″E
- Country: France
- Region: Bourgogne-Franche-Comté
- Department: Haute-Saône
- Arrondissement: Vesoul
- Canton: Gray

Government
  - Mayor (2020–2026): Christophe Laurençot
- Area^{1}: 20.26 km^{2} (7.82 sq mi)
- Highest elevation: 249 m (817 ft)
- Lowest elevation: 187 m (614 ft)
- Population (2023): 5,365
  - Density: 264.8/km^{2} (685.8/sq mi)
- Time zone: UTC+01:00 (CET)
  - Summer (DST): UTC+02:00 (CEST)
- INSEE/Postal code: 70279 /70100
- ^{1} French Land Register data, which excludes lakes, ponds, glaciers > 1 km^{2} (0.386 sq mi or 247 acres) and river estuaries.

Gray (French pronunciation: [ɡʁe]) is a commune in the Haute-Saône department, region of Bourgogne-Franche-Comté, eastern France.

== Geography ==
Gray is situated on the banks of the river Saône. It is the last major town in Haute-Saône before the Saône flows into Côte-d'Or.

== History ==
In the Middle Ages it was an important river port and trading center in Franche-Comté.

Gray is believed to have acquired its name from an old landed estate in its vicinity owned by a family with Gallo-Roman origins bearing the name "Gradus", a cognate of the Celtic "Grady" meaning "illustrious" or "noble".

Gray was founded in the 7th century. Its fortifications were destroyed by Louis XIV. During the Franco-German War General von Werder concentrated his army corps in the town and held it for a month, making it the point d'appui of movements towards Dijon and Langres, as well as towards Besançon.

== Population ==
Historical population
Year	Pop.	±% p.a.
1968	7,789	—
1975	8,805	+1.77%
1982	7,723	−1.86%
1990	6,916	−1.37%
1999	6,773	−0.23%
2007	6,175	−1.15%
2012	5,716	−1.53%
2017	5,512	−0.72%
2023	5,365	−0.45%
Source: INSEE

== Sights ==
The town includes many old buildings. An 18th-century stone bridge spans the Saône river, connecting the main town with the settlement of Arc-lès-Gray. Gray is a popular place for fishing and various water activities.

Gray's Basilica (Basilique Notre Dame) was built from 1478 to 1559, with a bell tower typical of Franche-Comté.

An art museum, the Musée Château Baron Martin, is housed in the Château of the Count of Provence, brother of Louis XVI, which in the 18th century replaced the fortress belonging to the Dukes of Burgundy. The 12th century "Paravis Tower" is the last remnant of the fortress and offers a panoramic view of the Saône Valley. The museum displays some 1200 pieces of art from the 15th to the 20th century throughout 24 rooms.

The Carmelite chapel (Chapelle des Carmelites) was built in 1667. Since 1978, it has held eight centuries of sacred art in Haute-Saône, including paintings, sculptures, and religious objects.

Gray is the site of France's National Esperanto Museum.

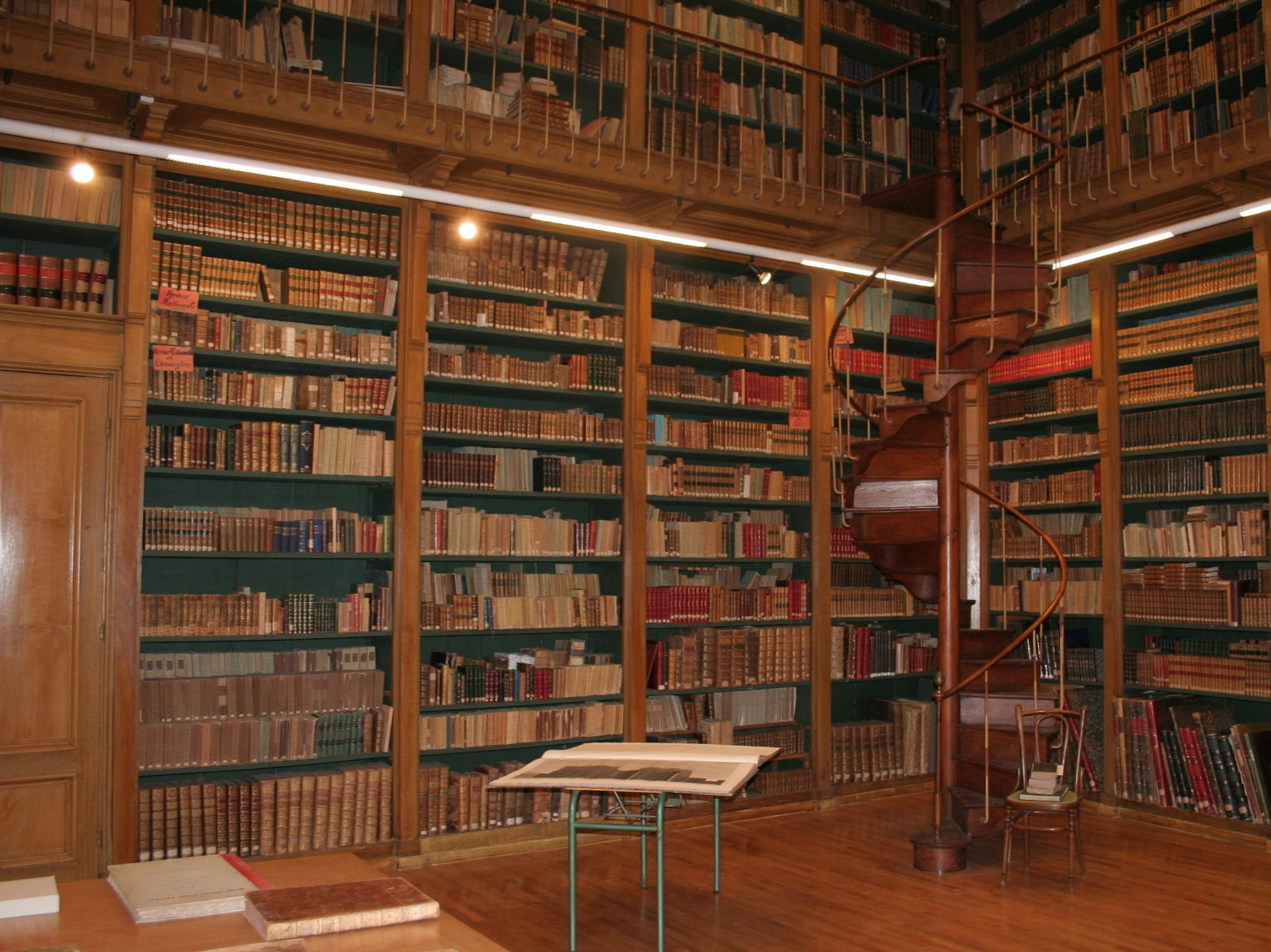
The Great Library

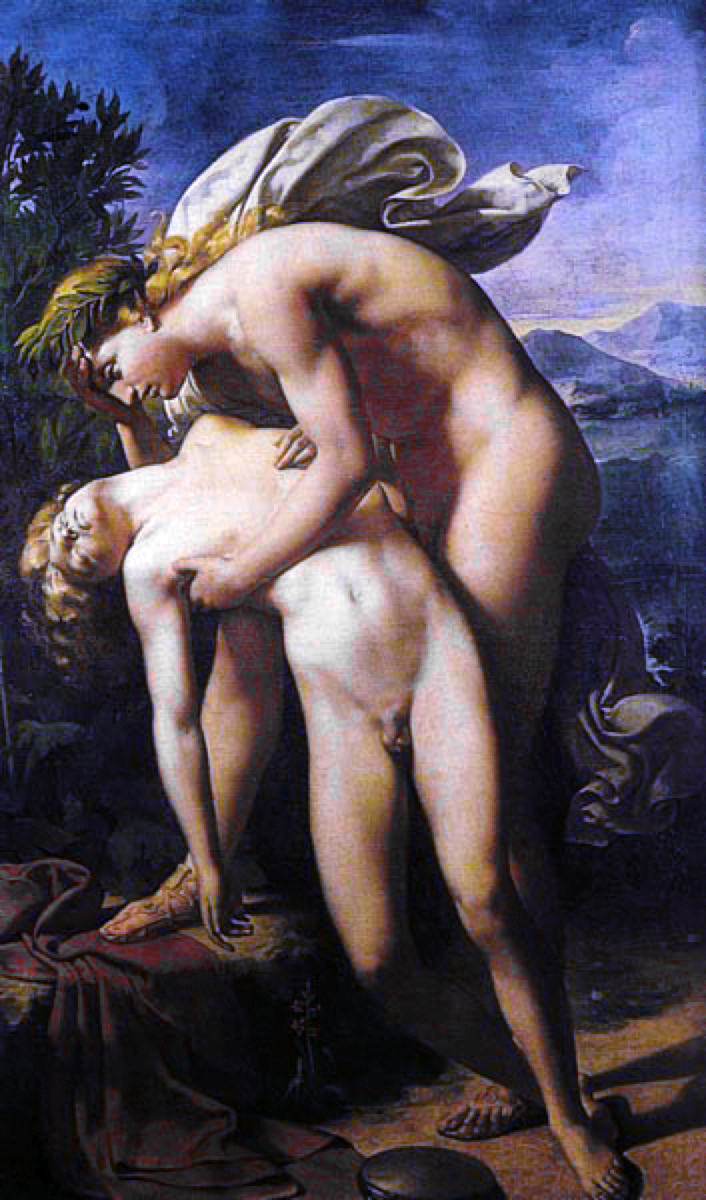
The death of Hyacinthus by Merry-Joseph Blondel, Musée Baron Martin

== Notable people ==
- Claude François Devosge (1697–1777), a sculptor and architect.
- François Devosge (1732–1811), a portraitist and history painter.
- Jean-Baptiste L. Romé de l'Isle (1736–1790), mineralogist, a creator of modern crystallography.
- Marguerite de Gourbillon (1737–1817), a noble and lady-in-waiting.
- Antoine Augustin Cournot (1801–1877), philosopher and mathematician, helped develop economics.
- Ferdinand de Lanoye (1810–1870), a writer.
- Anne Michaut (born 1972), a sprint canoeist.

== Transport ==
There is a bus station.

== See also ==
- Communes of the Haute-Saône department
