= Ferdinand de Lanoye =

French writer

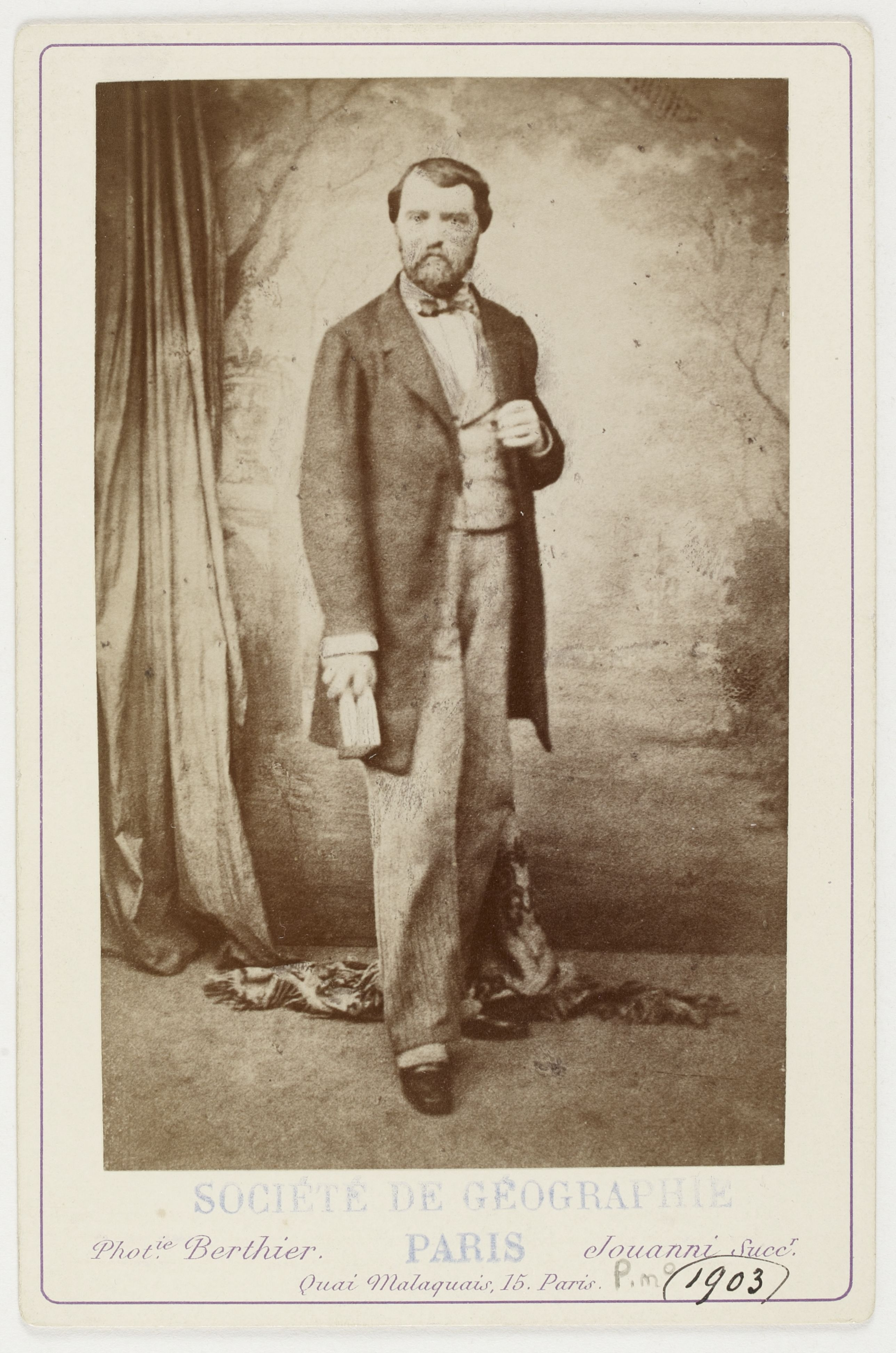
Portrait

Ferdinand Tugnot de Lanoye (1810–1870) was a French writer.

== Life ==
He was born in Gray, Haute-Saône, to a mother of Danish descent and a father who was a Napoleonic Captain. He studied in Avignon, where his history teacher was Hyacinthe Morel. Since Lanoye's father's Napoleonic associations made him unpopular in the Bourbon Restoration, Lanoye initially found it hard to start a public career. A volume of poetry, Songs and Dreams (1838) led to a friendship with Pierre-Jean de Béranger.

== Works ==
- (with A. Hervé) Voyages dans les glaces du Pôle arctique à la recherche du passage Nord-ouest: extraits des relations de Sir John Ross, Edward Parry, John Franklin, Beechey, Back, Mac Clure et autres navigateurs célèbres, 1854
- L'Inde contemporaine, 1855.
- Le Niger et les explorations de l'Afrique centrale: depuis Mungo-Park jusqu'au Docteur Barth, 1858.
- La mer Polaire : voyage de l'Érèbe et de la Terreur et expéditions à la recherche de Franklin, 1864
- La Sibérie d'après les voyageurs les plus récents, 1865
- Ramses le Grand, ou l'Egypte il y a trois mille trois cents ans, 1866. Translated as Ramses the Great, or, the Egypt of 3300 Years Ago, 1869.
- (ed.) Voyage dans les royaumes de Siam, de Cambodge, de Laos et autres parties centrales de l'Indo-Chine by Henri Mouhot, 1868.
- The sublime in nature: compiled from the descriptions of travellers and celebrated writers, 1870
- L'homme sauvage, 1873.
- La mer polaire voyage de l'Erèbe et de la Terreure et expéditions à la recherche de Franklin, 1878.
