= Presidency University, Kolkata =

Public university in Kolkata, India

Presidency University
- Latin: Universitas Praesidentialis
- Motto: Stabunt Vigilantes (Latin); Apramattaḥ Pramatteṣu (Sanskrit)
- Motto in English: Vigilant among the heedless
- Type: Public State University
- Established: c. 1817; 209 years ago
- Accreditation: NAAC
- Academic affiliations: UGC; AIU
- Budget: ₹92.86 crore (US$9.6 million) (FY2026–27 est.)
- Chancellor: Governor of West Bengal
- Vice-Chancellor: Nirmalya Narayan Chakraborty
- Faculty: 208 (2025)
- Students: 2,042 (2025)
- Undergraduates: 1,559 (2025)
- Postgraduates: 1,124 (2025)
- Doctoral students: 483 (2025)
- Location: Kolkata, West Bengal, India; 22°34′35″N 88°21′44″E
- Campus: College Street
- Other campuses: New Town; Kurseong
- Website: www.presiuniv.ac.in

Bāire Bæchākenā Shudʰu Kolāhôl
- University Anthem in 2017: file; help

The Presidency University, formerly Presidency College, is a public state university located in College Street, Kolkata. Established in 1817 as the Hindoo College, it was later renamed Presidency College in 1855 and functioned as a leading constituent college under the University of Calcutta. It is widely regarded as the oldest and one of the most prestigious places of higher education in India as well as one of the oldest in Asia. This institution has been the source of origination of many Institutions of national importance, the most prominent of them being the Indian Statistical Institute , an epitome of higher mathematical sciences in India, originating in the Department of Physics of the college as Department of Statistics way back in 1931, founded by an alumni and 6 times principal of then the college, Dr. Prasanta Chandra Mahalanobis, The Statistics Man of India. Another of such an example although with a slight twist is that of IIEST, Shibpur, the 2nd oldest engineering institution of the Indian Subcontinent, started as a department at then Hindoo College, was separated out to form Civil Engineering College and again merged with Presidency College as Department of Civil Engineering for a duration of 4 years upto 1880, when it was transferred to its present premises as Govt College, Howrah.

Alumni of Presidency University include two Nobel laureates, leaders of the Indian Independence Movement, heads of state, Academy Award winners and pioneers in Bengali art and literature playing a pivotal role in shaping modern Indian and Bengal education and intellectual discourse.

In its first cycle as a university, Presidency received "A" grade with a score of 3.04/4.00 by the National Assessment and Accreditation Commission. It has been recognized as a University of National Eminence by the University Grants Commission. It was awarded an "A" grade by the National Assessment and Accreditation Council (NAAC) in June 2024. The university received a Cumulative Grade Point Average (CGPA) of 3.13 out of 4, which is valid for five years.

== History ==
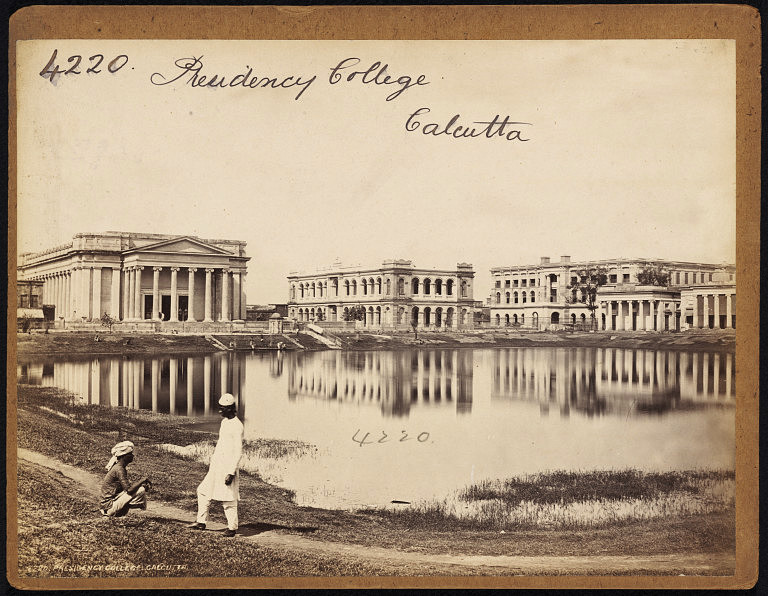
The Presidency College in Calcutta, by Francis Frith.

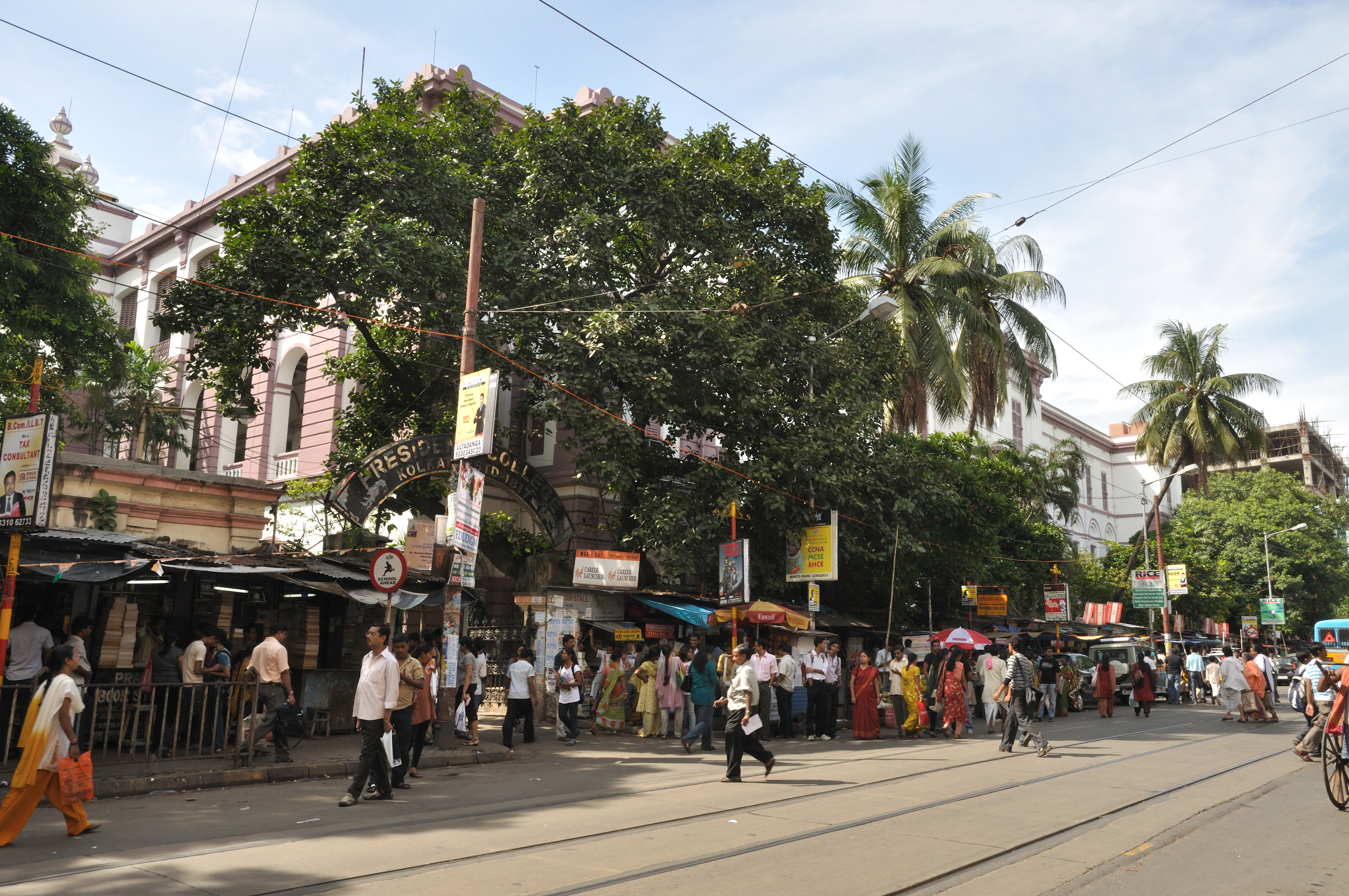
The main entrance of the university at College Street

With the creation of the Supreme Court of Calcutta in 1773 many Hindus of Bengal showed an eager interest in learning the English language. David Hare, in collaboration with Raja Radhakanta Deb had already taken steps to introduce English language education in Bengal. Babu Buddinath Mukherjee advanced the introduction of English as a medium of instruction further by enlisting the support of Sir Edward Hyde East, Chief Justice of the Supreme Court of Fort William, who called a meeting of 'European and Hindu Gentlemen' at his house in May 1816. The purpose of the meeting was to "discuss the proposal to establish an institution for giving a liberal education to the children of the members of the Hindu Community". The proposal was received with unanimous approbation and a donation of over Rs. 100,000 was promised for setting up the new college. The 5 Babus who contributed the most in setting up the college with their donations were - Raja Gopi Mohun Deb of Shovabazar Raj, Maharaja Tej Chandra of Bardhaman Raj, Raja Gopi Mohan Tagore of Pathuriaghata, Babu Joy Krishna Singha of Jorasanko, and Babu Ganga Narayan Das. Raja Ram Mohan Roy showed full support for the scheme, but chose not to come out in support of the proposal publicly for fear of "alarming the prejudices of his orthodox countrymen and thus marring the whole idea". Other eminent personalities of Calcutta at that time, such as Rani Rashmoni, Prince Dwarkanath Tagore, Babu Rajchandra Das and Mutty Lall Seal also donated hefty amounts towards the foundation of the College.

At first, the classes were held at Gorachand Bysack house called Garanhatta (later renamed 304, Chitpore Road), which was rented by the college. In January 1818 the college moved to 'Feringhi Kamal Bose's house in Chitpore. From Chitpore, the college moved to Bowbazar and later to the building that now houses the Sanskrit College on College Street.

=== Transformation to university ===
On 19 March 2010, the Government of West Bengal passed the Presidency University Bill, 2009 in the State Legislative Assembly. On 7 July 2010, the then Governor of West Bengal, M. K. Narayanan gave his assent to the Presidency University Bill. On 23 July 2010, the Government of West Bengal published the gazette notification completing all the legal formalities for presidency to become a full university. Amiya Bagchi was given the responsibility of chairing a committee set up to select and appoint the first vice-chancellor of the university. Amita Chatterjee, a retired professor of philosophy at Jadavpur University, was appointed as the first Vice-Chancellor of Presidency University on 5 October 2010.

In 2011, Higher Education Minister Bratya Basu suggested that a mentor group, along the lines of the Nalanda mentor group, would be formed to oversee the work of the university. At the beginning of June 2011, the Chief Minister of West Bengal, Mamata Banerjee, announced that a committee would be formed with Amartya Sen as its chief mentor and Harvard-based Sugata Bose as its chairman to oversee the running of the college and perform the task of appointing all its officials and faculty members. The Presidency mentor group also includes as its members 2019 Economics Nobel Prize winner Abhijit Banerjee, Ashoke Sen, Sabyasachi Bhattacharya, Nayanjot Lahiri, Himadri Pakrashi, Rahul Mukerjee and Isher Judge Ahluwalia, Swapan Kumar Chakravorty. Sukanta Chaudhuri resigned from the committee in 2012.

The entrance of the campus is marked with a small guardhouse on the left. On the wall of the guard room is a plaque dedicated to durwan (guard) Ram Eqbal Singh, who died defending the institute from rioters. The university held its bicentenary celebrations in 2017.

== Campus ==
=== New Town campus ===
The New Town campus of Presidency University is located in Kolkata, near the Biswa Bangla Convention Centre, The campus spans 10 acres with two 14-storey towers, the campus was inaugurated in February 2019 by the Chief Minister of West Bengal, Mamata Banerjee, and classes likely began in July 2019. It was built at a cost of Rs 183 crore over two years, reflecting a significant investment in educational infrastructure. The campus houses five advanced study centers, enhancing its research and academic offerings School of Biotechnology (integrated with School of Crop Technology), School of Astrophysics, School of Earth Sciences, School of Public Policy, School of Data Informatics, Cyber Security, and Big Data.

=== Himalayan Centre of Presidency University ===
Established as the third campus of Presidency University, Kolkata, the Himalayan Centre at Dow Hill, Kurseong, is an expansion into specialized research and higher education. Inaugurated following an announcement in August 2015 by West Bengal Chief Minister Mamata Banerjee, the project was backed by an initial state government investment of ₹30 crore, The campus was designed to leverage the unique geographical and ecological vantage point of the Eastern Himalayas. As of July 2025, the university began recruiting key administrative and academic positions.

The campus focuses on academic disciplines including Public Administration, Astrophysics and Space Sciences, and Himalayan Geological Studies and Tectonics. A defining feature is the proposed astronomical observatory, intended to be the first of its kind in the region. Additionally, the university has utilized this site for research in Climate Change, Biodiversity, and Social Anthropology, specifically documenting the indigenous cultures of the hills.

== Organisation structure ==
=== Governance ===
Like every state university in West Bengal, Presidency University is headed by the chancellor, who is the Governor of West Bengal. The vice-chancellor is the academic and administrative head of the institution. The post of the vice-chancellor replaced that of the principal after Presidency College received university status. Professor Anuradha Lohia was the first permanent vice-chancellor of the institution. The current Registrar of the university is Dr. Debajyoti Konar.

The Controller of Examinations, the Chief Librarian, the Finance officer and the Dean of students, along with the Dean of Arts and the Dean of Sciences, are the other important office holders of the university. The university is guided by a mentor group. The Mentor Group is chaired by Sugata Bose, the Gardiner Professor of Oceanic History and Affairs at Harvard University. Nobel Laureate and economist Amartya Sen serves as the Advisor to the chair.

List of Principals

=== Principals of Presidency College ===
- J. Kerr, 1842–1848
- David Lester Richardson, 1848–1849
- E. Lodge, 1849–1852
- J. Sutcliff, M.A., 1852–1856
- Leonidas Clint, 1856–1857
- E. Lodge, 1857–1858
- J. Sutcliffe, M.A., 1858–1863
- W. Grapel, 1863–1864
- J. Sutcliffe, M.A., 1864–1875
- H. Woodrow, 1875
- C. H. Tawney, 1875
- J. Sutcliffe, M.A., 1875
- Alfred Croft, 1876
- C. H. Tawney, 1876–1881
- G. Bellet, 1881–1882
- John Elliot, 1882–1883
- Alexander Pedler, 1883
- John Elliot, 1883
- G. Bellet, 1883
- John Elliot, 1884–1885
- C. H. Tawney, 1885
- W. Griffiths, 1885–1886
- C. H. Tawney, 1886–1887
- Alexander Pedler, 1887
- C. H. Tawney, 1887
- Alexander Pedler, 1887–1889
- C. H. Tawney, 1889
- Alexander Pedler, 1889
- Frederick James Rowe, 1889
- C. H. Tawney, 1889
- W. Griffiths, 1892–1896
- Alexander Pedler, 1896–1897
- J. H. Gilliland, 1897
- Frederick James Rowe, 1897–1898
- J. H. Gilliland, 1898
- Frederick James Rowe, 1898
- William Booth, 1898
- A. Clarke Edwards, 1899–1902
- Prasanna Kumar Roy, 1902
- A. Clarke Edwards, 1902–1903
- Prasanna Kumar Roy, 1903
- A. Clarke Edwards, 1903
- M. G. D. Prothero, 1904–1905
- Prasanna Kumar Roy, 1905–1906
- Alexander Macdonnell, 1906
- A. Clarke Edwards, 1906–1907
- Henry Rosher James, 1907–1909
- Hugh Melville Percival, 1909
- Henry Rosher James, 1909–1911
- C. W. Peake, 1911–1912
- Henry Rosher James, 1912–1916
- William Christopher Wordsworth, 1916–1917
- John Rothney Barrow, 1917–1924
- William Christopher Wordsworth, 1924
- H. E. Stapleton, 1924–1926
- T. S. Sterling, 1926–1927
- Professor Abdul Khalek M.A, 1927–1929
- John Rothney Barrow, 1929–1930
- Jahangir Cooverjee Coyajee, 1930–1931
- Bhupatimohan Sen, 1931–1934
- Bhupatimohan Sen, 1934–1936
- Prasanta Chandra Mahalanobis, 1936
- Bhupatimohan Sen, 1936–1942
- Prasanta Chandra Mahalanobis, 1942
- Bhupatimohan Sen, 1942–1943
- Apurbakumar Chanda, 1943
- Jyotirmoy Ghosh, 1943–1944
- Apurbakumar Chanda, 1944
- Prasanta Chandra Mahalanobis, 1945–1946
- Prasanta Chandra Mahalanobis, 1946–1947
- Muhammad Qudrat-i-Khuda, 1947
- Prasanta Chandra Mahalanobis, 1947
- Jogischandra Sinha, 1947
- Prasanta Chandra Mahalanobis, 1948
- Jyotirmoy Ghosh, 1948–1950
- Jyotishchandra Sengupta, 1950
- Jyotirmoy Ghosh, 1950–1951
- Jyotishchandra Sengupta, 1951–1956
- F. J. Friend-Pereira, 1956–1958
- Sanat Kumar Basu, 1958–1967
- Rajendralal Sengupta, 1967–1969
- Samerendranath Ghoshal, 1969–1970
- Sudhir Chandra Shome, 1970
- Pratul Chandra Mukherjee, 1970–1975
- Sudhir Chandra Shome, 1975–1976
- Pratul Chandra Mukherjee, 1976–1979
- Bijoy Shankar Basak, 1979–1982
- Achinta Kumar Mukherjee, 1982–1986
- Sunil Kumar Rai Chaudhuri, 1986–1991
- Amal Kumar Mukhopadhyay, 1991–1997
- Nitai Charan Mukherjee, 1997–2000
- Amitava Chatterjee, 2001–2005
- Mamata Ray, 2005–2008
- Sanjib Ghosh, 2008–2010
- Amitava Chatterjee, 2010

=== Departments ===
In academics, the university consists of two faculties – the Faculty of Natural and Mathematical Sciences and the Faculty of Humanities and Social Sciences. Both Faculties are headed by deans. A total of 16 departments function under the university. They are: Bengali, English, Hindi, History, Performing Arts, Philosophy, Political Science, Sociology, Life Sciences, Chemistry, Economics, Geography, Geology, Mathematics, Physics and Statistics.

Departments of Presidency University
- Bengali
- Life Sciences
- Chemistry
- Economics
- English
- Geography
- Geology
- Hindi
- History
- Mathematics
- Performing Arts
- Physics
- Philosophy
- Political Science
- Sociology
- Statistics
- Institute of Health Sciences
- School of Astrophysics

List of Vice Chancellors
Amita Chatterjee	2010–2011
Malabika Sarkar	2011–2014
Anuradha Lohia	2014–2023
Subhro Kamal Mukherjee (acting)	2023–2024
Nirmalya Narayan Chakraborty	2024–Incumbent

== Rankings ==
During its tenure as a college, formal national ranking systems like the National Institutional Ranking Framework (NIRF) were not in place. However different news outlets ranked Presidency college as one of the leading institutes for humanities and natural sciences.

Ranking years	1998	1999	2000	2001	2002	2003	2004	2005	2006	2007	2008	2009	2010
Science	2nd	2nd	-	-	3rd	2nd	-	3rd	4th	8th	3rd	5th	3rd
Humanities	2nd	2nd	-	1st	-	-	-	-	2nd	6th	4th	7th	6th

Presidency University, Kolkata was in the inaugural list of the top 50 institutions in the National Institutional Ranking Framework(NIRF) in 2016. In 2025, the university was ranked 124 in Asian University Rankings - Southern Asia. The university was ranked 151-200 overall in India by the NIRF (National Institutional Ranking Framework) in 2024.

University rankings

General – India
- NIRF (Overall) (2024): 151-200

== Notable alumni ==
Alumni of Presidency University include two Nobel Laureates in Economics, leaders of the Indian Independence Movement, heads of state, Academy Award winners, academicians and pioneers in Bengali renaissance.
