= Postcolonialism =

Study of the cultural legacy of colonialism and imperialism

Postcolonialism is the academic study of the cultural, political and economic consequences of colonialism and imperialism, focusing on the impact of human control and exploitation of colonized people and their lands. The field started to emerge in the 1960s, as scholars from previously colonized countries began publishing on the lingering effects of colonialism, developing an analysis of the history, culture, literature, and discourse of imperial power. Postcolonial studies overlaps with the related fields of critical theory and cultural studies.

== Purpose and basic concepts ==
As an epistemology (i.e., a study of knowledge, its nature, and verifiability), ethics (moral philosophy), and as a political science (i.e., in its concern with affairs of the citizenry), the field of postcolonialism addresses the matters that constitute the postcolonial identity of a decolonized people, which derives from:

1. the colonizer's generation of cultural knowledge about the colonized people; and
2. how that cultural knowledge was applied to subjugate a geographically or culturally distinct people into a colony of the colonizing empire, which, after initial invasion, was effected by means of the cultural identities of 'colonizer' and 'colonized'.

Postcolonialism is aimed at disempowering such theories (intellectual and linguistic, social and economic) by means of which colonialists "perceive," "understand," and "know" the world. Postcolonial theory thus creates intellectual spaces for subaltern peoples to speak in their own voices and produce cultural discourses of philosophy, language, society, and economy, correcting the us-and-them binary power-relationship between the colonist and the colonial subjects.

=== Approaches ===
Understanding the complex chain of political and social, economic, and cultural impacts left in the aftermath of colonial control is essential to understanding post-colonialism. A wide range of experiences are included in post-colonial discourse, from ongoing battles against colonialism and globalization to struggles for independence. The long-lasting effects of colonialism will be faced by them, such as identity issues, structural injustices, and the elimination of indigenous knowledge and customs.

Postcolonialism encompasses a wide variety of approaches, and theoreticians may not always agree on a common set of definitions. On a simple level, through anthropological study, it may seek to build a better understanding of colonial life—based on the assumption that the colonial rulers are unreliable narrators—from the point of view of the colonized people. On a deeper level, postcolonialism examines the social and political power relationships that sustain colonialism and neocolonialism, including the social, political, and cultural narratives surrounding the colonizer and the colonized. This approach may overlap with studies of contemporary history, and may also draw examples from anthropology, historiography, political science, philosophy, sociology, and human geography. Sub-disciplines of postcolonial studies examine the effects of colonial rule on the practice of feminism, anarchism, literature, and Christian thought.

At times, the term postcolonial studies may be preferred to postcolonialism, as the ambiguous term colonialism could refer either to a system of government, or to an ideology or world view underlying that system. However, postcolonialism (i.e., postcolonial studies) generally represents an ideological response to colonialist thought, rather than simply describing a system that comes after colonialism, as the prefix post- may suggest. As such, postcolonialism may be thought of as a reaction to or departure from colonialism in the same way postmodernism is a reaction to modernism; the term postcolonialism itself is modeled on postmodernism, with which it shares certain concepts and methods.

A clear reflection of the continuous fights for independence around the world is provided by the ongoing struggles against colonialism and globalization. The harsh effects of colonial rule and the homogenizing effects of globalization have development to movements in recent years. The opposition to colonialism and globalization represents a complex battle for liberty and independence, ranging from community organizations calling for economic sovereignty and self-determination to indigenous people defending their land and culture against corporate exploitation. These initiatives, which cross continents rather than stay inside a specific area, demonstrate the interdependence of movements and the shared pursuit of justice and emancipation.

=== Colonialist discourse ===
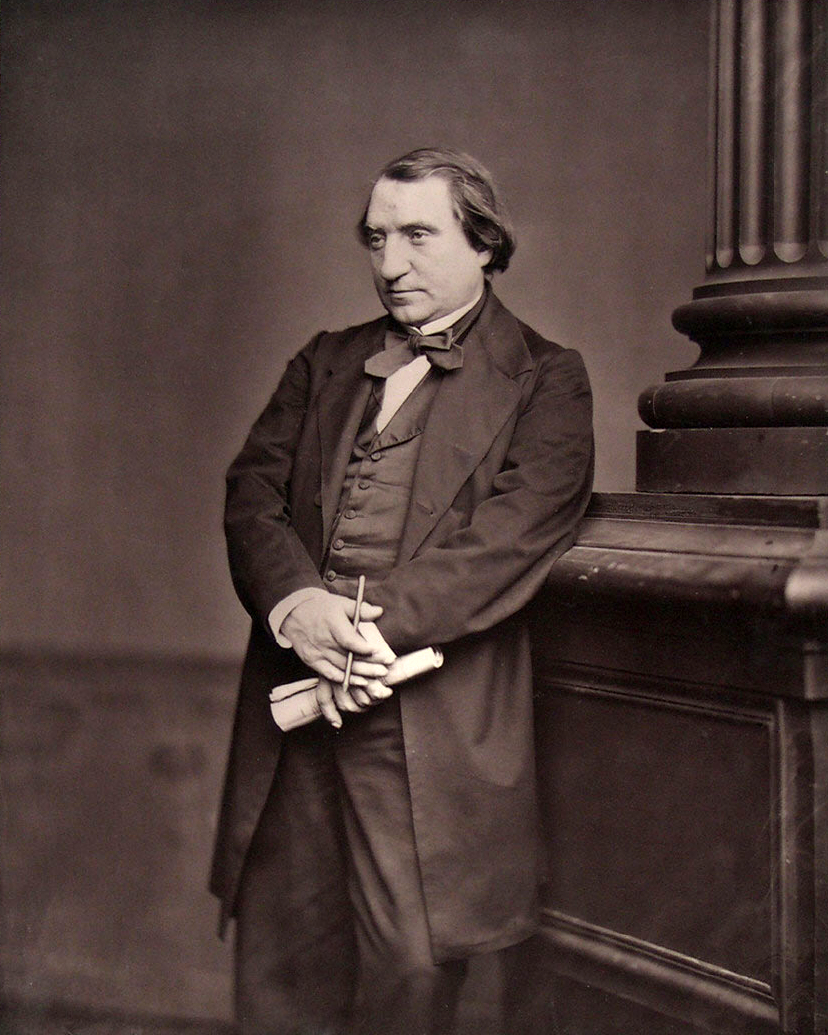
In La Réforme intellectuelle et morale (1871), the orientalist Ernest Renan, advocated imperial stewardship for civilizing the non–Western peoples of the world.

Colonialism was presented as "the extension of civilization," which ideologically justified the self-ascribed racial and cultural superiority of the Western world over the non-Western world. This concept was espoused by Ernest Renan in La Réforme intellectuelle et morale (1871), whereby imperial stewardship was thought to affect the intellectual and moral reformation of the coloured peoples of the lesser cultures of the world. That such a divinely established, natural harmony among the human races of the world would be possible, because everyone has an assigned cultural identity, a social place, and an economic role within an imperial colony. Thus:

The regeneration of the inferior or degenerate races, by the superior races is part of the providential order of things for humanity.... Regere imperio populos is our vocation. Pour forth this all-consuming activity onto countries, which, like China, are crying aloud for foreign conquest. Turn the adventurers who disturb European society into a ver sacrum, a horde like those of the Franks, the Lombards, or the Normans, and every man will be in his right role. Nature has made a race of workers, the Chinese race, who have wonderful manual dexterity, and almost no sense of honour; govern them with justice, levying from them, in return for the blessing of such a government, an ample allowance for the conquering race, and they will be satisfied; a race of tillers of the soil, the Negro; treat him with kindness and humanity, and all will be as it should; a race of masters and soldiers, the European race.... Let each do what he is made for, and all will be well.

— La Réforme intellectuelle et morale (1871), by Ernest Renan

From the mid- to the late-nineteenth century, such racialist group-identity language was the cultural common-currency justifying geopolitical competition amongst the European and American empires and meant to protect their over-extended economies. Especially in the colonization of the Far East and in the late-nineteenth century Scramble for Africa, the representation of a homogeneous European identity justified colonization. Hence, Belgium, Britain, France and Germany proffered theories of national superiority that justified colonialism as delivering the light of civilization to unenlightened peoples. La mission civilisatrice, the French Empire's self-proclaimed civilizing mission, held that more powerful, more developed, and more civilized races were entitled to colonize other peoples, serving the noble ideal of civilization and its economic benefits.

=== Postcolonial identity ===
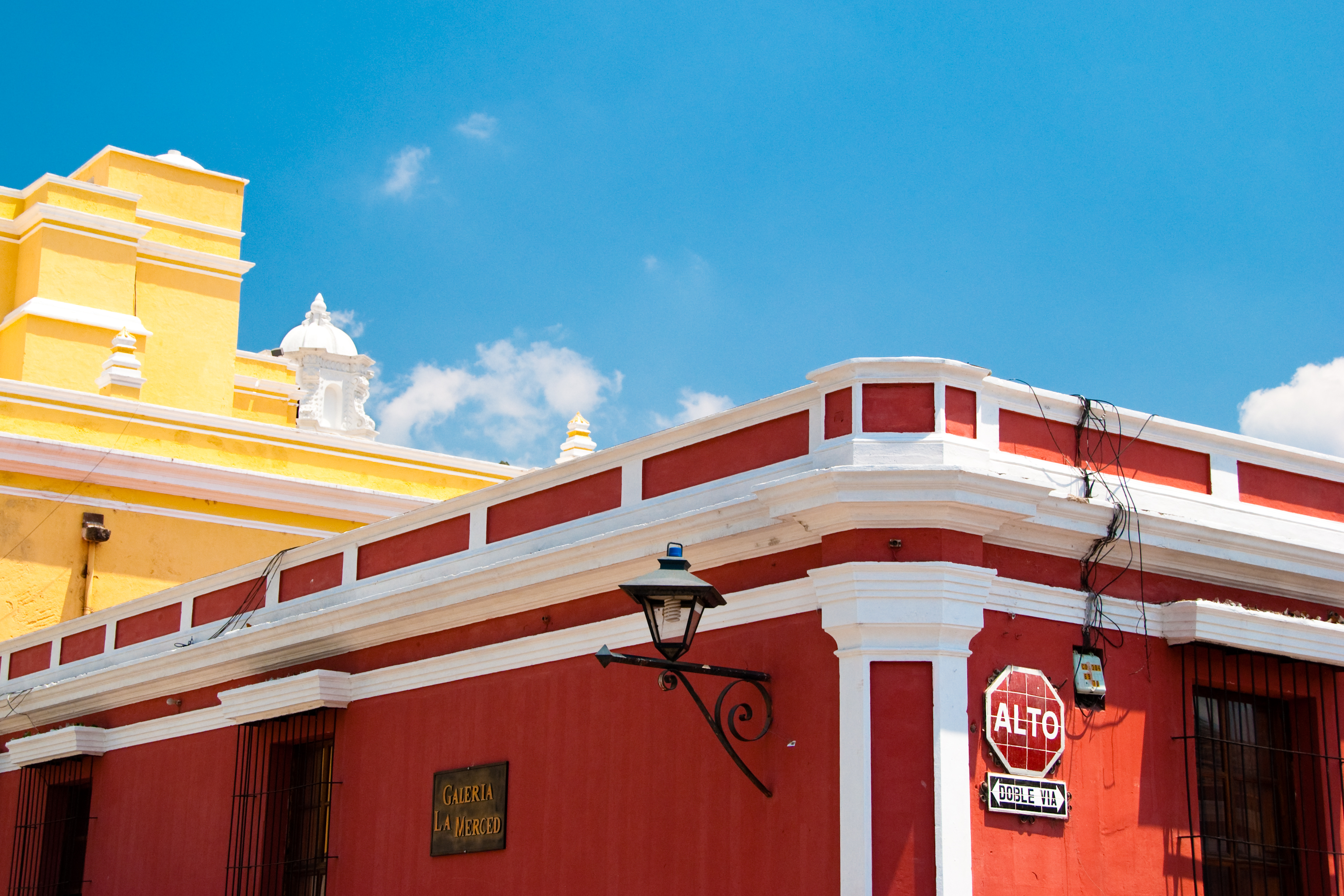
Spanish colonial architecture in Antigua Guatemala

Postcolonial theory holds that decolonized people develop a postcolonial identity that is based on cultural interactions between different identities (cultural, national, and ethnic as well as gender and class based) which are assigned varying degrees of social power by the colonial society. In postcolonial literature, the anti-conquest narrative analyzes the identity politics that are the social and cultural perspectives of the subaltern colonial subjects—their creative resistance to the culture of the colonizer; how such cultural resistance complicated the establishment of a colonial society; how the colonizers developed their postcolonial identity; and how neocolonialism actively employs the 'us-and-them' binary social relation to view the non-Western world as inhabited by 'the other'.

As an example, consider how neocolonial discourse of geopolitical homogeneity often includes the relegating of decolonized peoples, their cultures, and their countries, to an imaginary place, such as "the Third World." Oftentimes the term "the third World" is over-inclusive: it refers vaguely to large geographic areas comprising several continents and seas, i.e. Africa, Asia, Latin America, and Oceania. Rather than providing a clear or complete description of the area it supposedly refers to, it instead erases distinctions and identities of the groups it claims to represent. A postcolonial critique of this term would analyze the self-justifying usage of such a term, the discourse it occurs within, as well as the philosophical and political functions the language may have. Postcolonial critiques of homogeneous concepts such as the "Arabs," the "First World," "Christendom," and the "Ummah", often aim to show how such language actually does not represent the groups supposedly identified. Such terminology often fails to adequately describe the heterogeneous peoples, cultures, and geography that make them up. Accurate descriptions of the world's peoples, places, and things require nuanced and accurate terms. By including everyone under the Third World concept, it ignores why those regions or countries are considered Third World and who is responsible.

One of the ongoing struggles is balancing the cultural heritage of the indigenous people with the norms and values imposed by colonizers. This can cause identity fracture and a sense of displacement in people as well as communities. In addition, the hierarchical social structures that were created during colonial control have continued to support inequalities in power and injustice, which contributed to identity conflicts based on gender, class, and ethnicity. These problems are not just historical artifacts; rather, they are fundamental components of society and are expressed in current discussions about government, language, education, and cultural representation.

=== Difficulty of definition ===
As a term in contemporary history, postcolonialism occasionally is applied, temporally, to denote the immediate time after the period during which imperial powers retreated from their colonial territories. This temporal usage is problematic because the immediate historical and political period falls outside identity-discourse categories, which concern over-inclusive cultural representation terms that postcolonial criticism abrogates and replaces. As such, the terms postcolonial and postcolonialism denote aspects of the subject matter that indicate that the decolonized world is an intellectual space "of contradictions, of half-finished processes, of confusions, of hybridity, and of liminalities." The lack of clarity in the definition of the subject matter coupled with an open claim to normativity makes criticism of postcolonial discourse problematic, reasserting its dogmatic or ideological status.

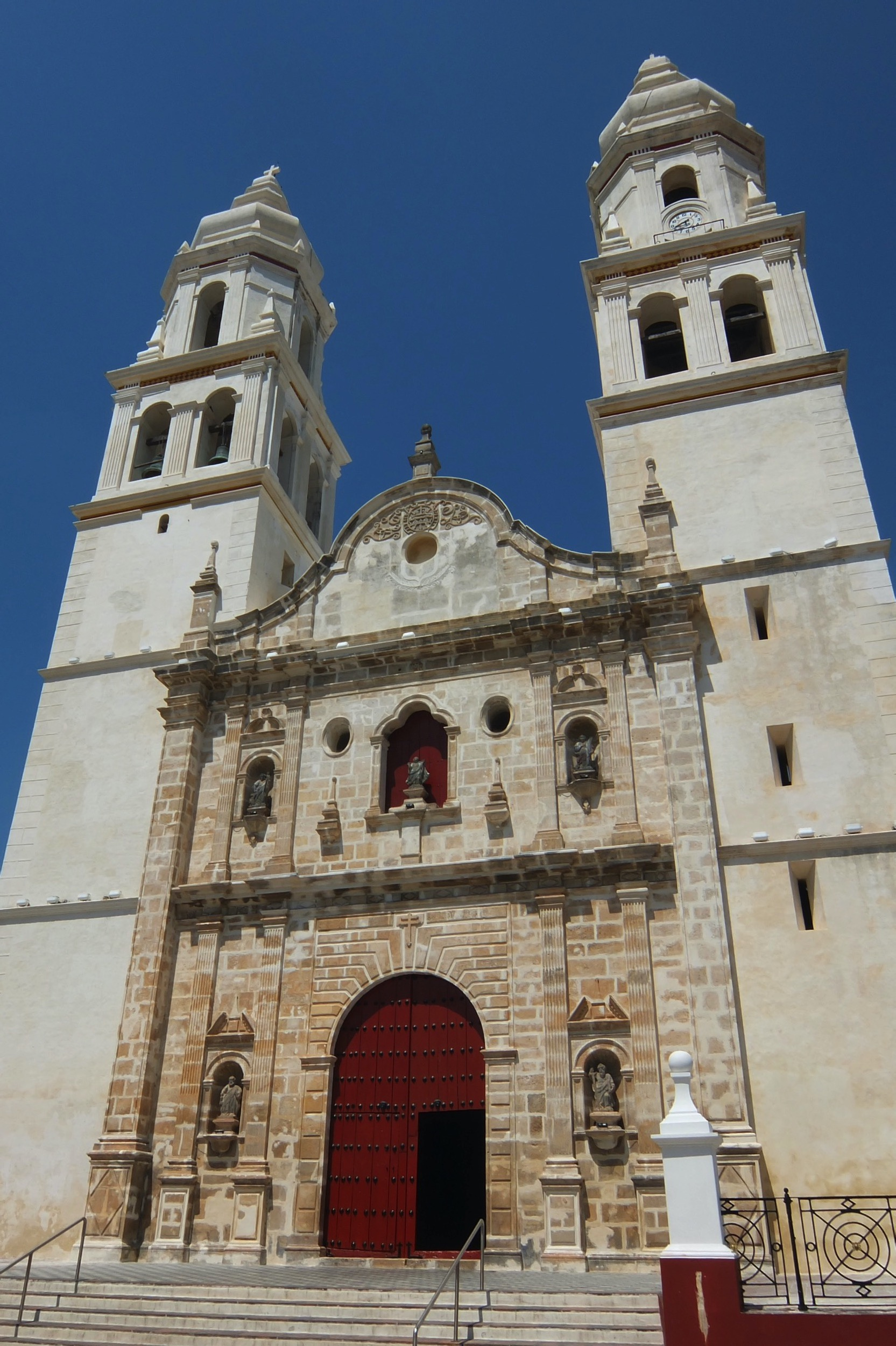
Campeche Cathedral, located in Campeche City, Mexico

In Post-Colonial Drama: Theory, Practice, Politics (1996), Helen Gilbert and Joanne Tompkins clarify the denotational functions, among which:

The term post-colonialism—according to a too-rigid etymology—is frequently misunderstood as a temporal concept, meaning the time after colonialism has ceased, or the time following the politically determined Independence Day on which a country breaks away from its governance by another state. Not a naïve teleological sequence, which supersedes colonialism, post-colonialism is, rather, an engagement with, and contestation of, colonialism's discourses, power structures, and social hierarchies... A theory of post-colonialism must, then, respond to more than the merely chronological construction of post-independence, and to more than just the discursive experience of imperialism.

The term post-colonialism is also applied to denote the Mother Country's neocolonial control of the decolonized country, affected by the legalistic continuation of the economic, cultural, and linguistic power relationships that controlled the colonial politics of knowledge (i.e., the generation, production, and distribution of knowledge) about the colonized peoples of the non-Western world. The cultural and religious assumptions of colonialist logic remain active practices in contemporary society and are the basis of the Mother Country's neocolonial attitude towards her former colonial subjects—an economical source of labour and raw materials. It acts as a non interchangeable term that links the independent country to its colonizer, depriving countries of their independence, decades after building their own identities.

Postcolonialism, as in the postcolonial condition, is to be understood, as Mahmood Mamdani puts it, as a reversal of colonialism but not as superseding it.

== Notable theoreticians and theories ==
=== Frantz Fanon and subjugation ===
Frantz Fanon, a psychiatrist and philosopher, in The Wretched of the Earth (1961) gives a clinical analysis of colonialism as essentially destructive. Its societal effects—the imposition of a subjugating colonial identity—is harmful to the mental health of the native peoples who were subjugated into colonies. Fanon writes that the ideological essence of colonialism is the systematic denial of "all attributes of humanity" of the colonized people. Such dehumanization is achieved with physical and mental violence, by which the colonist means to inculcate a servile mentality upon the natives.

For Fanon, the natives must violently resist colonial subjugation. Hence, Fanon describes violent resistance to colonialism as a mentally cathartic practise, which purges colonial servility from the native psyche, and restores self-respect to the subjugated. Thus, Fanon actively supported and participated in the Algerian Revolution (1954–62) for independence from France as a member and representative of the Front de Libération Nationale.

As postcolonial praxis, Fanon's mental health analyses of colonialism and imperialism and their supporting economic theories drew partly on Lenin's 1916 essay "Imperialism, the Highest Stage of Capitalism", where Vladimir Lenin portrayed colonial imperialism as an advanced capitalism compelled by relentless growth to exploit ever more people for reliable investment returns.

Another book that predates postcolonial theories is Fanon's Black Skin, White Masks. In this book, Fanon discusses the logic of colonial rule from the perspective of the existential experience of racialized subjectivity. Fanon treats colonialism as a total project which rules every aspect of colonized peoples and their reality. Fanon reflects on colonialism, language, and racism and asserts that to speak a language is to adopt a civilization and to participate in the world of that language. His ideas show the influence of French and German philosophy, since existentialism, phenomenology, and hermeneutics claim that language, subjectivity, and reality are interrelated. However, the colonial situation presents a paradox: when colonial beings are forced to adopt and speak an imposed language which is not their own, they adopt and participate in the world and civilization of the colonized. This language derives from centuries of colonial domination intended to erase other expressive forms to reflect the colonizer's world. As a consequence, when colonial beings speak as the colonized, they participate in their own oppression and the very structures of alienation are reflected in all aspects of their adopted language.

=== Edward Said and orientalism ===
Cultural critic Edward Said is considered by E. San Juan, Jr. as "the originator and inspiring patron-saint of postcolonial theory and discourse" due to his interpretation of the theory of orientalism explained in his 1978 book, Orientalism. To describe the us-and-them "binary social relation" with which Western Europe intellectually divided the world—into the "Occident" and the "Orient"—Said developed the denotations and connotations of the term orientalism (an art-history term for Western depictions and the study of the Orient). Said's concept (which he also termed "orientalism") is that the cultural representations generated with the us-and-them binary relation are social constructs, which are mutually constitutive and cannot exist independent of each other, because each exists on account of and for the other.

"The West" constructed the cultural idea of "the East," and, according to Said, this prevented the peoples of the Middle East, the Indian Subcontinent, and Asia from expressing and representing themselves as distinct peoples and cultures. Orientalism merged the diverse non‑Western regions into a single stereotype called "the East." In service of colonial imperialism, the orientalist us‑versus‑them framework allowed European scholars to represent the Orient as inferior, backward, irrational and wild, while presenting Western Europe as superior, progressive, rational and civilized, the polar opposite of the Oriental Other.

Reviewing Said's Orientalism (1978), A. Madhavan (1993) says that "Said's passionate thesis in that book, now an 'almost canonical study', represented Orientalism as a 'style of thought' based on the antinomy of East and West in their world-views, and also as a 'corporate institution' for dealing with the Orient."

Drawing on philosopher Michel Foucault, Said contended that power and knowledge are inseparable elements of the intellectual binary through which Occidentals claim "knowledge of the Orient," and that Europeans exploited such cultural knowledge to rename, redefine, and dominate Oriental peoples, places, and things, converting them into imperial colonies. The power-knowledge binary relation is conceptually essential to identify and understand colonialism. Hence,

To the extent that Western scholars were aware of contemporary Orientals or Oriental movements of thought and culture, these were perceived either as silent shadows to be animated by the orientalist, brought into reality by them or as a kind of cultural and international proletariat useful for the orientalist's grander interpretive activity.

— Orientalism (1978), p. 208.

Nonetheless, critics of the homogeneous "Occident–Orient" binary social relation, say that Orientalism is of limited descriptive capability and practical application, and propose instead that there are variants of Orientalism that apply to Africa and to Latin America. Said responds that the European West applied Orientalism as a homogeneous form of The Other, in order to facilitate the formation of the cohesive, collective European cultural identity denoted by the term "The West."

With this described binary logic, the West generally constructs the Orient subconsciously as its alter ego. Therefore, descriptions of the Orient by the Occident lack material attributes, grounded within the land. This imaginative interpretation ascribes female characteristics to the Orient and plays into fantasies that are inherent within the West's alter ego. It should be understood that this process draws creativity, amounting to an entire domain and discourse.

In Orientalism (p. 6), Said mentions the production of "philology [the study of the history of languages], lexicography [dictionary making], history, biology, political and economic theory, novel-writing and lyric poetry." There is an entire industry that exploits the Orient for its own subjective purposes, one that lacks a native and intimate understanding. Such industries become institutionalized and eventually become a resource for manifest Orientalism, or for compiling misinformation about the Orient.

The ideology of Empire was hardly ever a brute jingoism; rather, it made subtle use of reason and recruited science and history to serve its ends.

— Rana Kabbani, Imperial Fictions: Europe's Myths of Orient (1994), p. 6

These subjective fields of academia now synthesize the political resources and think-tanks that are so common in the West today. Orientalism is self-perpetuating to the extent that it becomes normalized within common discourse, making people say things that are latent, impulsive, or not fully conscious of it.

There have been other attempts to generalize the concept of Orientalism beyond the limited historical case of "the West and the rest." For example, in their edited volume Grammars of Identity/Alterity: A Structural Approach, anthropologists Gerd Baumann and Andre Gingrich propose that Orientalism should be re-appropriated as one of three basic modes of human relations. The others are Segmentation (under which others are accepted as legitimate and equal), and Encompassment (under which the other's separate existence is rejected and denied; the other can only be seen as a subset of the self). Orientalism, then, is an unequal mix of recognition, fascination, and contempt. The book's many authors examine how this scheme may be applicable in multiple ethnographic and literary contexts around the world (=mostly outside the West/Rest paradigm, such as examining the relation between dominant lowlanders and dominated highland ethnic groups, in Laos).

=== Gayatri Spivak and the subaltern ===
In establishing the Postcolonial definition of the term subaltern, the philosopher and theoretician Gayatri Chakravorty Spivak cautioned against assigning an over-broad connotation. She argues:

... subaltern is not just a classy word for "oppressed", for The Other, for somebody who's not getting a piece of the pie... In postcolonial terms, everything that has limited or no access to the cultural imperialism is subaltern—a space of difference. Now, who would say that's just the oppressed? The working class is oppressed. It's not subaltern.... Many people want to claim subalternity. They are the least interesting and the most dangerous. I mean, just by being a discriminated-against minority on the university campus; they don't need the word 'subaltern'... They should see what the mechanics of the discrimination are. They're within the hegemonic discourse, wanting a piece of the pie, and not being allowed, so let them speak, use the hegemonic discourse. They should not call themselves subaltern.

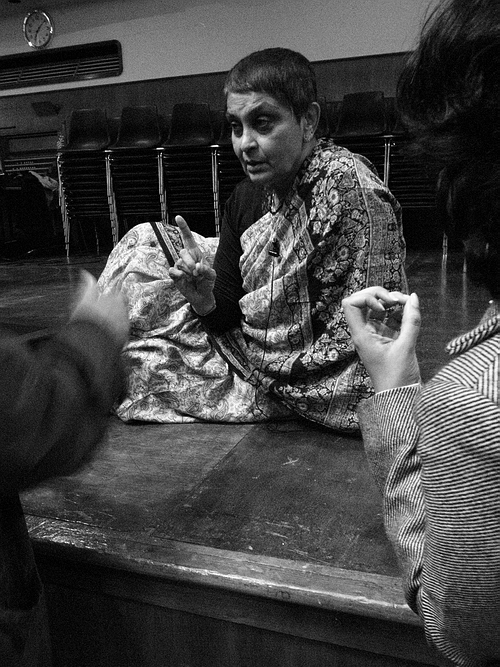
Engaging the voice of the Subaltern: the philosopher and theoretician Gayatri Chakravorty Spivak, at Goldsmith College.

Spivak also introduced the terms essentialism and strategic essentialism to describe the social functions of postcolonialism.

Essentialism denotes the perceptual dangers inherent to reviving subaltern voices in ways that might (over) simplify the cultural identity of heterogeneous social groups and, thereby, create stereotyped representations of the different identities of the people who compose a given social group. Strategic essentialism, on the other hand, denotes a temporary, essential group-identity used in the praxis of discourse among peoples. Furthermore, essentialism can occasionally be applied—by the so-described people—to facilitate the subaltern's communication in being heeded, heard, and understood, because strategic essentialism (a fixed and established subaltern identity) is more readily grasped, and accepted, by the popular majority, in the course of inter-group discourse. The important distinction, between the terms, is that strategic essentialism does not ignore the diversity of identities (cultural and ethnic) in a social group, but that, in its practical function, strategic essentialism temporarily minimizes inter-group diversity to pragmatically support the essential group-identity.

Spivak developed and applied Foucault's term epistemic violence to describe the destruction of non-Western ways of perceiving the world and the resultant dominance of the Western ways of perceiving the world. Conceptually, epistemic violence specifically relates to women, whereby the "Subaltern [woman] must always be caught in translation, never [allowed to be] truly expressing herself," because the colonial power's destruction of her culture pushed to the social margins her non–Western ways of perceiving, understanding, and knowing the world.

In June of the year 1600, the Afro–Iberian woman Francisca de Figueroa requested from the King of Spain his permission for her to emigrate from Europe to New Granada, and reunite with her daughter, Juana de Figueroa. As a subaltern woman, Francisca repressed her native African language, and spoke her request in Peninsular Spanish, the official language of Colonial Latin America. As a subaltern woman, she applied to her voice the Spanish cultural filters of sexism, Christian monotheism, and servile language, in addressing her colonial master:

I, Francisca de Figueroa, mulatta in colour, declare that I have, in the city of Cartagena, a daughter named Juana de Figueroa; and she has written, to call for me, in order to help me. I will take with me, in my company, a daughter of mine, her sister, named María, of the said colour; and for this, I must write to Our Lord the King to petition that he favour me with a licence, so that I, and my said daughter, can go and reside in the said city of Cartagena. For this, I will give an account of what is put down in this report; and of how I, Francisca de Figueroa, am a woman of sound body, and mulatta in colour.... And my daughter María is twenty-years-old, and of the said colour, and of medium size. Once given, I attest to this. I beg your Lordship to approve and order it done. I ask for justice in this. [On the twenty-first day of the month of June 1600, Your Majesty's Lords Presidents and Official Judges of this House of Contract Employment order that the account she offers be received, and that testimony for the purpose she requests given.]

— Afro–Latino Voices: Narratives from the Early Modern Ibero–Atlantic World: 1550–1812 (2009)

Moreover, Spivak further cautioned against ignoring subaltern peoples as "cultural Others", and said that the West could progress—beyond the colonial perspective—by means of introspective self-criticism of the basic ideas and investigative methods that establish a culturally superior West studying the culturally inferior non–Western peoples. Hence, the integration of the subaltern voice to the intellectual spaces of social studies is problematic, because of the unrealistic opposition to the idea of studying "Others"; Spivak rejected such an anti-intellectual stance by social scientists, and about them said that "to refuse to represent a cultural Other is salving your conscience...allowing you not to do any homework." Moreover, postcolonial studies also reject the colonial cultural depiction of subaltern peoples as hollow mimics of the European colonists and their Western ways; and rejects the depiction of subaltern peoples as the passive recipient-vessels of the imperial and colonial power of the Mother Country. Consequent to Foucault's philosophic model of the binary relationship of power and knowledge, scholars from the Subaltern Studies Collective, proposed that anti-colonial resistance always counters every exercise of colonial power.

=== Homi K. Bhabha and hybridity ===
In The Location of Culture (1994), theoretician Homi K. Bhabha argues that viewing the human world as composed of separate and unequal cultures, rather than as an integral human world, perpetuates the belief in the existence of imaginary peoples and places—"Christendom" and the "Islamic World", "First World," "Second World," and the "Third World." To counter such linguistic and sociological reductionism, postcolonial praxis establishes the philosophic value of hybrid intellectual spaces, wherein ambiguity abrogates truth and authenticity; thereby, hybridity is the philosophic condition that most substantively challenges the ideological validity of colonialism.

=== R. Siva Kumar and alternative modernity ===
In 1997, on the occasion of the 50th anniversary of India's Independence, "Santiniketan: The Making of a Contextual Modernism" was an important exhibition curated by R. Siva Kumar at the National Gallery of Modern Art. In his catalogue essay, Kumar introduced the term Contextual Modernism, which later emerged as a postcolonial tool in the understanding of Indian art, specifically the works of Nandalal Bose, Rabindranath Tagore, Ramkinkar Baij, and Benode Behari Mukherjee.

Santiniketan artists did not believe that to be indigenous one has to be historicist either in theme or in style, and similarly to be modern one has to adopt a particular trans-national formal language or technique. Modernism was to them neither a style nor a form of internationalism. It was re-engagement with the foundational aspects of art necessitated by changes in one's unique historical position.

In the post-colonial history of art, this marked the departure from Eurocentric unilateral idea of modernism to alternative context sensitive modernisms.

The brief survey of the individual works of the core Santiniketan artists and the thought perspectives they open up makes clear that though there were various contact points in the work they were not bound by a continuity of style but by a community of ideas. Which they not only shared but also interpreted and carried forward. Thus they do not represent a school but a movement.

— Santiniketan: The Making of a Contextual Modernism, 1997

Several terms including Paul Gilroy's counterculture of modernity and Tani E. Barlow's Colonial modernity have been used to describe the kind of alternative modernity that emerged in non-European contexts. Professor Gall argues that 'Contextual Modernism' is a more suited term because "the colonial in colonial modernity does not accommodate the refusal of many in colonized situations to internalize inferiority. Santiniketan's artist teachers' refusal of subordination incorporated a counter vision of modernity, which sought to correct the racial and cultural essentialism that drove and characterized imperial Western modernity and modernism. Those European modernities, projected through a triumphant British colonial power, provoked nationalist responses, equally problematic when they incorporated similar essentialisms."

=== Dipesh Chakrabarty ===
In Provincializing Europe (2000), Dipesh Chakrabarty charts the subaltern history of the Indian struggle for independence, and counters Eurocentric, Western scholarship about non-Western peoples and cultures, by proposing that Western Europe simply be considered as culturally equal to the other cultures of the world; that is, as "one region among many" in human geography.

=== Derek Gregory and the colonial present ===
Derek Gregory argues the long trajectory through history of British and American colonization is an ongoing process still happening today. In The Colonial Present, Gregory traces connections between the geopolitics of events happening in modern-day Afghanistan, Palestine, and Iraq and links it back to the us-and-them binary relation between the Western and Eastern world. Building upon the ideas of the other and Said's work on orientalism, Gregory critiques the economic policy, military apparatus, and transnational corporations as vehicles driving present-day colonialism. Emphasizing discussion of ideas around colonialism in the present tense, Gregory utilizes modern events such as the September 11 attacks to tell spatial stories around the colonial behavior happening due to the War on Terror.

=== Amar Acheraiou and Classical influences ===
Acheraiou argues that colonialism was a capitalist venture moved by appropriation and plundering of foreign lands and was supported by military force and a discourse that legitimized violence in the name of progress and a universal civilizing mission. This discourse is complex and multi-faceted. It was elaborated in the 19th century by colonial ideologues such as Ernest Renan and Arthur de Gobineau, but its roots reach far back in history.

In Rethinking Postcolonialism: Colonialist Discourse in Modern Literature and the Legacy of Classical Writers, Acheraiou examines the history of colonialist discourse, tracing its origins to ancient Greece, notably the European claim of racial supremacy and the right to govern non-Europeans, as voiced by Renan and other 19th‑century colonial ideologues. He argues that modern colonial representations of the colonized as "inferior," "stagnant," and "degenerate" were borrowed from Greek and Latin authors like Lysias (440–380 BC), Isocrates (436–338 BC), Plato (427–327 BC), Aristotle (384–322 BC), Cicero (106–43 BC), and Sallust (86–34 BC), who all considered their racial others—the Persians, Scythians, Egyptians as "backward," "inferior," and "effeminate."

Among these ancient writers Aristotle is the one who articulated more thoroughly these ancient racial assumptions, which served as a source of inspiration for modern colonists. In The Politics, he established a racial classification and ranked the Greeks superior to the rest. He considered them as an ideal race to rule over Asian and other 'barbarian' peoples, for they knew how to blend the spirit of the European "war-like races" with Asiatic "intelligence" and "competence."

Ancient Rome was a source of admiration in Europe since the enlightenment. In France, Voltaire (1694–1778) was one of the most fervent admirers of Rome. He regarded highly the Roman republican values of rationality, democracy, order and justice. In early-18th century Britain, it was poets and politicians like Joseph Addison (1672–1719) and Richard Glover (1712 –1785) who were vocal advocates of these ancient republican values.

It was in the mid-18th century that ancient Greece became a source of admiration among the French and British. This enthusiasm gained prominence in the late-eighteenth century. It was spurred by German Hellenist scholars and English romantic poets, who regarded ancient Greece as the matrix of Western civilization and a model of beauty and democracy. These included: Johann Joachim Winckelmann (1717–1768), Wilhelm von Humboldt (1767–1835), and Goethe (1749–1832), Lord Byron (1788–1824), Samuel Taylor Coleridge (1772–1834), Percy Bysshe Shelley (1792–1822), and John Keats (1795–1821).

In the 19th century, when Europe began to expand across the globe and establish colonies, ancient Greece and Rome were used as a source of empowerment and justification to Western civilizing mission. At this period, many French and British imperial ideologues identified strongly with the ancient empires and invoked ancient Greece and Rome to justify the colonial civilizing project. They urged European colonizers to emulate these "ideal" classical conquerors, whom they regarded as "universal instructors."

For Alexis de Tocqueville (1805–1859), an ardent and influential advocate of la "Grande France," the classical empires were model conquerors to imitate. He advised the French colonists in Algeria to follow the ancient imperial example. In 1841, he stated:

[W]hat matters most when we want to set up and develop a colony is to make sure that those who arrive in it are as less estranged as possible, that these newcomers meet a perfect image of their homeland....the thousand colonies that the Greeks founded on the Mediterranean coasts were all exact copies of the Greek cities on which they had been modelled. The Romans established in almost all parts of the globe known to them municipalities which were no more than miniature Romes. Among modern colonizers, the English did the same. Who can prevent us from emulating these European peoples?.

The Greeks and Romans were deemed exemplary conquerors and "heuristic teachers," whose lessons were invaluable for modern colonists ideologues. John-Robert Seeley (1834–1895), a history professor at Cambridge and proponent of imperialism stated in a rhetoric which echoed that of Renan that the role of the British Empire was 'similar to that of Rome, in which we hold the position of not merely of ruling but of an educating and civilizing race."

The incorporation of ancient concepts and racial and cultural assumptions into modern imperial ideology bolstered colonial claims to supremacy and right to colonize non-Europeans. Because of these numerous ramifications between ancient representations and modern colonial rhetoric, 19th century's colonialist discourse acquires a "multi-layered" or "palimpsestic" structure. It forms a "historical, ideological and narcissistic continuum," in which modern theories of domination feed upon and blend with "ancient myths of supremacy and grandeur."

== Postcolonial literary study ==
As a literary theory, postcolonialism deals with the literatures produced by the peoples who once were colonized by the European imperial powers (e.g. Britain, France, and Spain) and the literatures of the decolonized countries engaged in contemporary, postcolonial arrangements (e.g. Organisation internationale de la Francophonie and the Commonwealth of Nations) with their former mother countries.

Postcolonial literary criticism comprehends the literatures written by the colonizer and the colonized, wherein the subject matter includes portraits of the colonized peoples and their lives as imperial subjects. In Dutch literature, Indies literature consists of colonial and postcolonial genres that examine the formation of a postcolonial identity and the culture produced by the diaspora of Indo-European people, the Eurasians who originated from Indonesia, the colony of the Dutch East Indies; a notable author is Tjalie Robinson. Waiting for the Barbarians (1980) by J. M. Coetzee depicts the unfair and inhuman situation of people dominated by settlers.

To perpetuate and facilitate control of the colonial enterprise, some colonized people, especially from colonies ruled by the British Empire, were sent to attend university in the Imperial Motherland; they were to become the native-born, but Europeanised, ruling class of colonial satraps. Yet, after decolonization, their bicultural educations originated postcolonial criticism of empire and colonialism, and of the representations of the colonist and the colonized. Following the dissolution of the USSR in 1991, the former Soviet Socialist Republics became subjects of postcolonial literary criticism, and their writers addressed the cultural, social, and economic legacies of Russification of their peoples, countries, and cultures in service to Greater Russia.

Postcolonial literary study is in two categories:

1. the study of postcolonial nations; and
2. the study of the nations who continue forging a postcolonial national identity.

The first category of literature presents and analyzes the internal challenges inherent to determining an ethnic identity in a decolonized nation.

The second category of literature presents and analyzes the degeneration of civic and nationalist unities consequent to ethnic parochialism, usually manifested as the demagoguery of "protecting the nation," a variant of the us-and-them binary social relation. Civic and national unity degenerate when a patriarchal régime unilaterally defines what is and what is not "the national culture" of the decolonized country: the nation-state collapses, either into communal movements, espousing grand political goals for the postcolonial nation; or into ethnically mixed communal movements, espousing political separatism, as occurred in decolonized Rwanda, the Sudan, and the Democratic Republic of the Congo; thus the postcolonial extremes against which Frantz Fanon warned in 1961.

== Application ==
=== Middle East ===
In the essay "Overstating the Arab State" (2001) by Nazih Ayubi, the author deals with the psychologically-fragmented postcolonial identity, as determined by the effects (political and social, cultural and economic) of Western colonialism in the Middle East. These societies exhibit fragmented national identity resulting from colonial boundaries (geographic and cultural) drawn by Europeans for imperial convenience, which overlooked the tribal and clan relations that had defined the borders of Middle Eastern countries before European imperialism. Hence, the postcolonial literature about the Middle East examines and analyzes the Western discourses about identity formation, the existence and inconsistent nature of a postcolonial national-identity among the peoples of the contemporary Middle East.

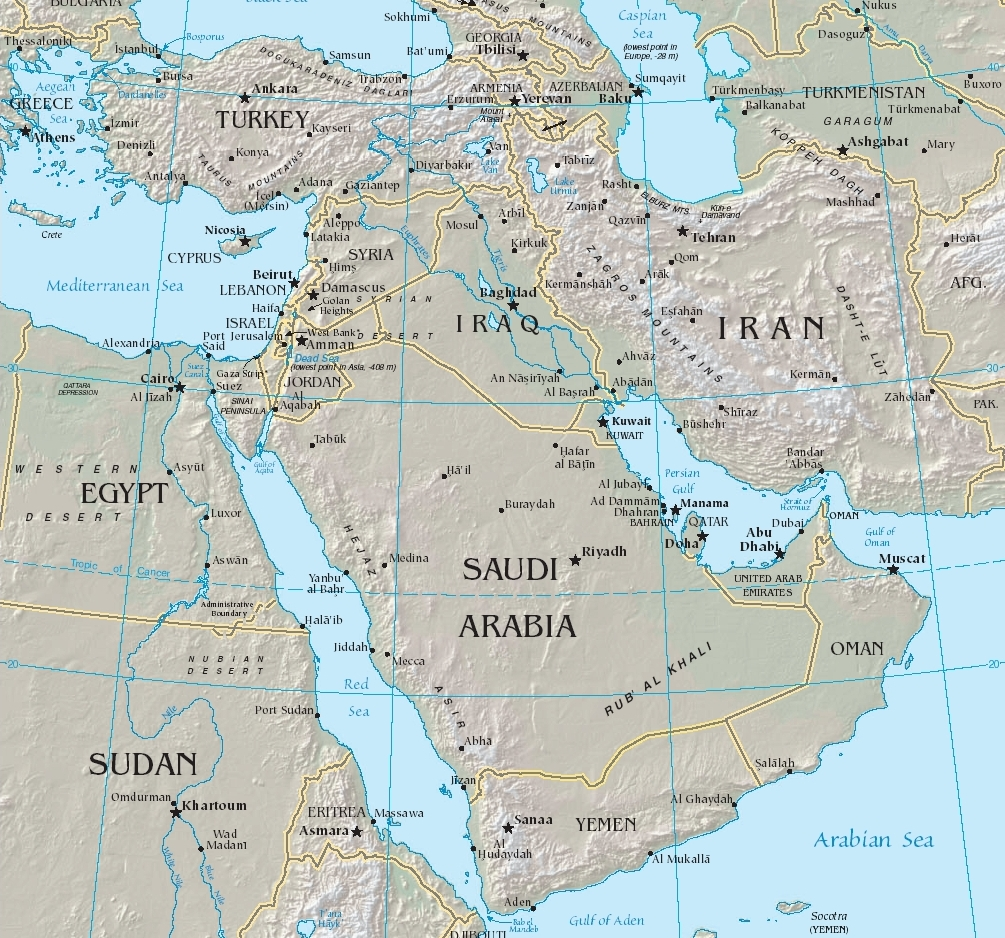
"The Middle East" is the Western name for the countries of South-western Asia.

In his essay "Who Am I?: The Identity Crisis in the Middle East" (2006), P.R. Kumaraswamy says:

Most countries of the Middle East, suffered from the fundamental problems over their national identities. More than three-quarters of a century after the disintegration of the Ottoman Empire, from which most of them emerged, these states have been unable to define, project, and maintain a national identity that is both inclusive and representative.

Independence and the end of colonialism did not end social fragmentation and war (civil and international) in the Middle East. In The Search for Arab Democracy: Discourses and Counter-Discourses (2004), Larbi Sadiki argues that Middle Eastern national‑identity problems arise from the orientalist indifference of European empires, which, while imposing a Western view of the region, drew colonial borders without regard for local history or the geographic and tribal boundaries observed by natives. In the event:

[I]n places like Iraq and Jordan, leaders of the new sovereign states were brought in from the outside, [and] tailored to suit colonial interests and commitments. Likewise, most states in the Persian Gulf were handed over to those [Europeanised colonial subjects] who could protect and safeguard imperial interests in the post-withdrawal phase.

Moreover, "with notable exceptions like Egypt, Iran, Iraq, and Syria, most [countries]...[have] had to [re]invent, their historical roots" after decolonization, and, "like its colonial predecessor, postcolonial identity owes its existence to force."

=== Africa ===
Colonialism in 1913: the African colonies of the European empires; and the postcolonial, 21st-century political boundaries of the decolonized countries. (Click image for key)

In the late 19th century, the Scramble for Africa (1874–1914) proved to be the tail end of mercantilist colonialism of the European imperial powers, yet, for the Africans, the consequences were greater than elsewhere in the colonized non–Western world. To facilitate the colonization the European empires laid railroads where the rivers and the land proved impassable. The Imperial British railroad effort proved overambitious in the effort of traversing continental Africa, yet succeeded only in connecting colonial North Africa (Cairo) with the colonial south of Africa (Cape Town).

Upon arrival, Europeans encountered African civilizations such as the Ashanti Empire, Benin Empire, Kingdom of Dahomey, Buganda Kingdom (Uganda), and Kingdom of Kongo; imperial powers annexed them believing European stewardship was needed.

Kenyan writer Ngũgĩ wa Thiong'o wrote Weep Not, Child (1964), the first postcolonial novel on the East African experience of colonial imperialism, and Decolonizing the Mind: The Politics of Language in African Literature (1986). His novel The River Between (1965), set amid the Mau Mau Uprising (1952–60), examines African religious cultures and the consequences of imposing Christianity, a faith culturally alien to Kenya and most of Africa.

In postcolonial countries of Africa, Africans and non–Africans live in a world of genders, ethnicities, classes and languages, of ages, families, professions, religions and nations. Certain scholars argue that individualism and postcolonialism constitute discontinuous and divergent cultural phenomena.

=== Asia ===
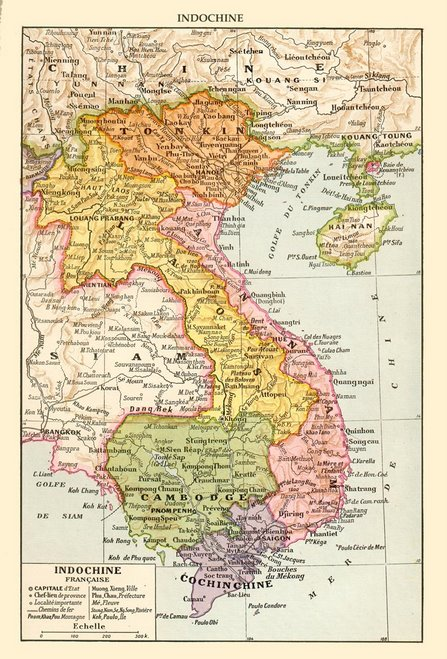
Map of French Indochina from the colonial period showing its five subdivisions: Tonkin, Annam, Cochinchina, Cambodia and Laos. (Click image for key)

French Indochina was divided into five subdivisions: Tonkin, Annam, Cochinchina, Cambodia, and Laos. Cochinchina (southern Vietnam) was the first territory under French control; Saigon was conquered in 1859; and in 1887, the Indochinese Union (Union indochinoise) was established.

In 1924, Nguyen Ai Quoc (aka Ho Chi Minh) wrote the first text against the French colonization: Le Procès de la Colonisation française ('French Colonization on Trial')

Trinh T. Minh-ha has been developing her innovative theories about postcolonialism in various means of expression, literature, films, and teaching. She is best known for her documentary film Reassemblage (1982), in which she attempts to deconstruct anthropology as a "western male hegemonic ideology." In 1989, she wrote Woman, Native, Other: Writing Postcoloniality and Feminism, in which she focuses on the acknowledgement of oral tradition.

=== Eastern Europe ===
The partitions of Poland (1772–1918) and occupation of Eastern European countries by the Soviet Union after the Second World War were forms of "white" colonialism, for long overlooked by postcolonial theorists. The Prussian, Austrian, Russian, and later Soviet empires dominated Belarus, Bulgaria, Czechoslovakia, Hungary, Lithuania, Moldova, Poland, Romania, and Ukraine through military invasion, resource exploitation, cultural devastation, and forced linguistic re-education, resembling Western Europe's violent overseas conquests despite geographic proximity and no racial difference.

Postcolonial studies in East-Central and Eastern Europe were inaugurated by Ewa M. Thompson's seminal book Imperial Knowledge: Russian Literature and Colonialism (2000), followed by works of Aleksander Fiut, Hanna Gosk, Violeta Kelertas, Dorota Kołodziejczyk, Janusz Korek, Dariusz Skórczewski, Bogdan Ştefănescu, and Tomasz Zarycki.

=== Ireland ===
If by colonization we mean the conquest of one society by another more powerful society on its way to acquiring a vast empire, the settlement of the conquered territory by way of population transfers from the conquering one, the systematic denigration of the culture of the earlier inhabitants, the dismantling of their social institutions and the imposition of new institutions designed to consolidate the recently arrived settler community's power over the 'natives' while keeping that settler community in its turn dependent on the 'motherland', then Ireland may be considered one of the earliest and most thoroughly colonized regions of the British Empire.

— Joe Cleary, Postcolonial writing in Ireland (2012)

Ireland experienced centuries of English/British colonialism between the 12th and 18th centuries – notably the Statute of Drogheda, 1494, which subordinated the Irish Parliament to the English (later, British) government – before the Kingdom of Ireland merged with the Kingdom of Great Britain on 1 January 1801 as the United Kingdom. Most of Ireland became independent of the U.K. in 1922 as the Irish Free State, a self-governing dominion of the British Empire. Pursuant to the Statute of Westminster, 1931 and enactment of a new Irish Constitution, Éire became fully independent of the United Kingdom in 1937; and then became a republic in 1949. Northern Ireland, in northeastern Ireland (northwestern Ireland is part of the Republic of Ireland), remains a province of the United Kingdom. Many scholars have drawn parallels between:

- the economic, cultural and social subjugation of Ireland, and the experiences of the colonized regions of the world
- the depiction of the native Gaelic Irish as wild, tribal savages and the depiction of other indigenous peoples as primitive and violent
- the partition of Ireland by the U.K. government, analogous to the partitioning and boundary-drawing of the other future nation states by colonial powers
- the post-independence struggle of the Irish Free State (which became the Republic of Ireland in 1949) to establish economic independence and its own identity in the world, and the similar struggles of other post-colonial nations; though, uniquely, Ireland had been independent, then become part of the U.K., then mostly independent again. Ireland's membership of and support for the European Union has often been framed as an attempt to break away from the United Kingdom's economic orbit.

In 2003, Clare Carroll wrote in Ireland and Postcolonial Theory that "the "colonizing activities" of Raleigh, Gilbert, and Drake in Ireland can be read as a "rehearsal" for their later exploits in the Americas, and argues that the English Elizabethans represent the Irish as being more alien than the contemporary European representations of Native Americans."

Rachel Seoighe wrote in 2017, "Ashis Nandy describes how colonisation impacts on the native's interior life: the meaning of the Irish language was bound up with loss of self in socio-cultural and political life. The purportedly wild and uncivilised Irish language itself was held responsible for the 'backwardness' of the people. Holding tight to your own language was thought to bring death, exile and poverty. These ideas and sentiments are recognised by Seamus Deane in his analysis of recorded memories and testimony of the Great Famine in the 1840s. The recorded narratives of people who starved, emigrated and died during this period reflect an understanding of the Irish language as complicit in the devastation of the economy and society. It was perceived as a weakness of a people expelled from modernity: their native language prevented them from casting off 'tradition' and 'backwardness' and entering the 'civilised' world, where English was the language of modernity, progress and survival."

The Troubles (1969–1998), a period of conflict in Northern Ireland between mostly Catholic and Gaelic Irish nationalists (who wish to join the Irish Republic) and mostly Protestant Scots-Irish and Anglo-Irish unionists (who are a majority of the population and wish to remain part of the United Kingdom) has been described as a post-colonial conflict. In Jacobin, Daniel Finn criticised journalism which portrayed the conflict as one of "ancient hatred", ignoring the imperial context.

=== Structural adjustment programmes (SAPs) ===
Structural adjustment programmes (SAPs) implemented by the World Bank and IMF are viewed by some postcolonialists as the modern procedure of colonization. Structural adjustment programmes (SAPs) calls for trade liberalization, privatization of banks, health care, and educational institutions. These implementations minimized government's role, paved pathways for companies to enter Africa for its resources. Limited to production and exportation of cash crops, many African nations acquired more debt, and were left stranded in a position where acquiring more loan and continuing to pay high interests became an endless cycle.

The Dictionary of Human Geography uses the definition of colonialism as "enduring relationship of domination and mode of dispossession, usually (or at least initially) between an indigenous (or enslaved) majority and a minority of interlopers (colonizers), who are convinced of their own superiority, pursue their own interests, and exercise power through a mixture of coercion, persuasion, conflict and collaboration."

== Postcolonial literature ==
=== Foundational works ===
Some works written prior to the formal establishment of postcolonial studies as a discipline have been considered retroactively as works of postcolonialist theory.

- 1924. Le Procès de la Colonisation française ('French Colonization on Trial'), by Nguyen Ai Quoc (aka Ho Chi Minh)
- 1950. Discourse on Colonialism, by Aimé Césaire
- 1952. Black Skin, White Masks, by Frantz Fanon
- 1961. The Wretched of the Earth, by Frantz Fanon
- 1965. The Colonizer and the Colonized, by Albert Memmi
- 1970. Consciencism, by Kwame Nkrumah
- 1978. Orientalism, by Edward Said
- 1988. Can the Subaltern Speak?, by Gayatri Chakravorty Spivak

== Criticism ==
=== Undermining of universal values ===
Indian-American Marxist scholar Vivek Chibber has critiqued some foundational logics of postcolonial theory in his book Postcolonial Theory and the Specter of Capital. Drawing on Aijaz Ahmad's earlier critique of Said's Orientalism and Sumit Sarkar's critique of the Subaltern Studies scholars, Chibber focuses on and refutes the principal historical claims made by the Subaltern Studies scholars; claims that are representative of the whole of postcolonial theory. Postcolonial theory, he argues, essentializes cultures, painting them as fixed and static categories. Moreover, it presents the difference between East and West as unbridgeable, hence denying people's "universal aspirations" and "universal interests." He also criticized the postcolonial tendency to characterize all of Enlightenment values as Eurocentric. According to him, the theory will be remembered "for its revival of cultural essentialism and its acting as an endorsement of orientalism, rather than being an antidote to it."

=== Fixation on national identity ===
Postcolonial studies centers on national identity, deeming it essential to forming a stable nation post-decolonization, and holds that an ambiguous national identity impedes the social, cultural, and economic progress of decolonized peoples. In Overstating the Arab State (2001) by Nazih Ayubi, Moroccan scholar Bin 'Abd al-'Ali proposed that the existence of "a pathological obsession with...identity" is a cultural theme common to the contemporary academic field Middle Eastern Studies.

Kumaraswamy and Sadiki argue that accounting for the common sociological problem of indeterminate national identity among Middle Eastern countries is necessary to understand the politics of the contemporary Middle East. In the event, Ayubi asks if what 'Bin Abd al–'Ali sociologically described as an obsession with national identity might be explained by "the absence of a championing social class?"

In his essay The Death of Postcolonialism: The Founder's Foreword, Mohamed Salah Eddine Madiou argues that postcolonialism as an academic study and critique of colonialism is a "dismal failure." While explaining that Edward Said never affiliated himself with the postcolonial discipline and is, therefore, not "the father" of it as most would have us believe, Madiou, borrowing from Barthes' and Spivak's death-titles (The Death of the Author and Death of a Discipline, respectively), argues that postcolonialism is today not fit to study colonialism and is, therefore, dead "but continue[s] to be used which is the problem." Madiou gives one clear reason for considering postcolonialism a dead discipline: the avoidance of serious colonial cases, such as Palestine.

== See also ==
- Decolonization
- Decolonization of public space
- Postcolonial anarchism
- Postcolonial feminism
- Postcolonial international relations
- Postcolonial theology
- Post-communism
- Post-Western era

== Bibliography ==
- Gregory, Derek (2009). Dictionary of Human Geography. Hoboken, NJ.: Wiley-Blackwell Publishing.
- Fanon, Frantz (1963). The Wretched of the Earth. New York: Grove Press. ISBN 978-0-8021-5083-7.
- Fischer-Tiné, Harald (2011). "Postcolonial Studies". Ego | Europäische Geschichte Online. European History Online.
- Hart, Jonathan; Goldie, Terrie (1993). "Post-colonial Theory". In Makaryk, Irene Rima; Hutcheon, Linda; Perron, Paul (eds.). Encyclopedia of Contemporary Literary Theory: Approaches, Scholars, Terms. Toronto, Canada: University of Toronto Press. ISBN 0-8020-5914-7.
- Kumaraswamy, P. R. (March 2006). "Who Am I? The Identity Crisis in the Middle East". The Middle East Review of International Affairs. 10 (1, Article 5).
- Quayson, Ato (2000). Postcolonialism: Theory, Practice, or Process?. Polity Press, Blackwell Publishers Ltd. ISBN 978-0-7456-1712-1.
- Sadiki, Larbi (2004). The Search for Arab Democracy: Discourses and Counter-Discourses. India: C. Hurst & Co. Ltd. ISBN 978-1-85065-494-0.
- Said, Edward (1978). Orientalism. New York: Pantheon. ISBN 978-0394428147.
- Spivak, Gayatri Chakravorty (1990). "Can the Subaltern Speak?" (PDF). Archived from the original (PDF) on January 5, 2012.
- Alatas, Syed Hussein. 1977. The Myth of the Lazy Native.
- Anderson, Benedict. [1983] 1991. Imagined Communities: Reflections on the Origin and Spread of Nationalism. London: Verso. ISBN 0-86091-329-5.
- Ashcroft, B., G. Griffiths, and H. Tiffin. 1990. The Empire Writes Back: Theory and Practice in Post-Colonial Literature.
- Amin, Samir. 1988. L'eurocentrisme ('Eurocentrism').
- Balagangadhara, S. N. [1994] 2005. "The Heathen in his Blindness..." Asia, the West, and the Dynamic of Religion. Manohar books. ISBN 90-04-09943-3.
- Bhabha, Homi K. 1994. The Location of Culture.
- Chambers, I., and L. Curti, eds. 1996. The Post-Colonial Question. Routledge.
- Chatterjee, P. Nation and Its Fragments: Colonial and Postcolonial Histories. Princeton University Press.
- Gandhi, Leela. 1998. Postcolonial Theory: A Critical Introduction. Columbia University Press: ISBN 0-231-11273-4.
- Guevara, Che. 11 December 1964. "Colonialism is Doomed" (speech). 19th General Assembly of the United Nations. Havana.
- Minh-ha, Trinh T. 1989. Woman, Native, Other: Writing Postcoloniality and Feminism. Indiana University Press.
- Hashmi, Alamgir. 1998. The Commonwealth, Comparative Literature and the World: Two Lectures. Islamabad: Gulmohar.
- Hountondji, Paulin J. 1983. African Philosophy: Myth & Reality.
- Jayawardena, Kumari. 1986. Feminism and Nationalism in the Third World.
- JanMohamed, A. 1988. Manichean Aesthetics: The Politics of Literature in Colonial Africa.
- Kiberd, Declan. 1995. Inventing Ireland.
- Lenin, Vladimir. 1916. Imperialism, the Highest Stage of Capitalism.
- Mannoni, Octave, and P. Powesland. Prospero and Caliban, the Psychology of Colonization.
- Nandy, Ashis. 1983. The Intimate Enemy: Loss and Recovery of Self Under Colonialism.
- McClintock, Anne. 1994. "The Angel of Progress: Pitfalls of the Term 'Postcolonialism'." In Colonial Discourse/Postcolonial Theory, edited by M. Baker, P. Hulme, and M. Iverson.
- Mignolo, Walter. 1999. Local Histories/Global designs: Coloniality.
- Mohanty, Chandra Talpade. 1986. Under Western Eyes.
- Mudimbe, V. Y. 1988. The Invention of Africa.
- Narayan, Uma. 1997. Dislocating Cultures.
- Parry, B. 1983. Delusions and Discoveries.
- Quijano, Aníbal. [1991] 1999. "Coloniality and Modernity/Rationality." In Globalizations and Modernities.
- Retamar, Roberto Fernández. [1971] 1989 . "Calibán: Apuntes sobre la cultura de Nuestra América" ['Caliban: Notes About the Culture of Our America']. In Calibán and Other Essays.
- Said, Edward. 1993. Culture and Imperialism.
- Spivak, Gayatri Chakravorty. 1988. Can the Subaltern Speak?
- wa Thiong'o, Ngũgĩ. 1986. Decolonizing the Mind: The Politics of Language in African Literature.
- Young, Robert J. C. 1990. White Mythologies: Writing History and the West.
- Ankerl, G. 2000. Coexisting Contemporary Civilizations. Geneva: Indiana University Press. ISBN 2-88155-004-5.
- Bachetta, Paola. 2012. Cahiers du CEDREF on Decolonial Feminist and Queer Theories.
- Dabashi, Hamid. 2007. Iran: A People Interrupted.
- Dean, B., and J. Levi, eds. 2003. At the Risk of Being Heard: Indigenous Rights, Identity, and Postcolonial States. University of Michigan Press. ISBN 0-472-06736-2.
- Dhawan, N. 2005. "Postkolonial Theorie. Eine kritische Einführung" ['Postcolonial Theory: A Critical Enquiry'].
- Kuttainen, Victoria. 2009. Unsettling Stories: Settler Postcolonialism.
- El-Enany, Nadine. 2020. Bordering Britain
- Gopal, Priyamvada. 2019. Insurgent Empire
- Mbembe, Achille. 2000. On the Postcolony. Regents of the University of California.
- McLeod, John. 2000. Beginning Postcolonialism.
- 2010. Beginning Postcolonialism (2nd ed.). Manchester University Press.
- Mignolo, Walter. 2005. The Idea of Latin América.
- Paperson, L. 2005. "The Postcolonial Ghetto." doi:10.5070/B81110026.
- Poddar, Prem, and David Johnson, ed. 2008. A Historical Companion to Postcolonial Literatures in English. Edinburgh: Edinburgh University Press. ISBN 978-0-7486-3602-0. Retrieved 2016-02-23.
- Prine, Richard. 2014. The Disappointed Bridge: Ireland and the Post-Colonial World.
- Risam, Roopika. 2018. New Digital Worlds: Postcolonial Digital Humanities in Theory, Praxis, and Pedagogy.
- Salzman, Philip C., and D. Robinson Divine, eds. 2008. Postcolonial Theory and the Arab–Israeli Conflict. Routledge.
- Young, Robert J. C. 2001. Postcolonialism: An Historical Introduction.
