= Postcolonial Theory and the Specter of Capital =

2013 book by Vivek Chibber

- Author: Vivek Chibber
- Language: English
- Subject: Postcolonialism
- Genre: Sociology
- Publisher: Verso
- Publication date: March 12th 2013
- Media type: Print (Hardcover, Paperback)
- Pages: 256
- ISBN: 9781844679768

Postcolonial Theory and the Specter of Capital is a 2013 book by the American sociologist and New York University professor Vivek Chibber.

Drawing from the radical Enlightenment tradition, this book serves as a critique of Postcolonial Theory.

Chibber focuses on the Subaltern Studies section of the theory, and demonstrates how its foundational arguments are based on a series of political and historical misunderstandings.

== Content ==
In his critique of postcolonial theory, Chibber argues that postcolonial theory characterizes all Enlightenment ideas as Eurocentric. Chibber asserts that the popular Subaltern Studies project has its foundational arguments rooted in analytical and historical misinterpretations. The main focus of the text is to demonstrate the possibility of a universalizing theory without reliance on Eurocentrism or reductionism.

== Reception ==
Chibber's work received a mixture of positive reviews and criticism. Noam Chomsky termed the text a "scrupulous and perceptive analysis", and "a very significant contribution." According to him, Chibber has succeeded in showing that "universalizing categories of Enlightenment thought" emerge unscathed from postcolonial criticism.

Slavoj Zizek also gave it a strong positive review, calling it "the book we were all waiting for." According to Zizek, "this book simply sets the record straight, and puts postcolonialism into its place: at the heart of global Capitalist processes." Robert Brenner, American quarterly magazine Jacobin, and the Los Angeles Review of Books also gave Chibber positive reviews.

The book received criticism from Indian postcolonial theorist Gayatri Spivak in the Cambridge Review of International Affairs. Spivak asserted that Chibber may not be the best person to begin exposing the flaws of postcolonial theory. Chibber replied in the same journal, defending his choices in the original article. Chibber's publisher, Verso, would go on to publish The Debate on Postcolonial Theory and the Specter of Capital, which brought together the major critics of Chibber's work.

== See also ==
- David Harvey
- Gayatri Spivak
- Postcolonial Theory
- Subaltern Studies
