= Vivek Chibber =

American sociologist (born 1965)

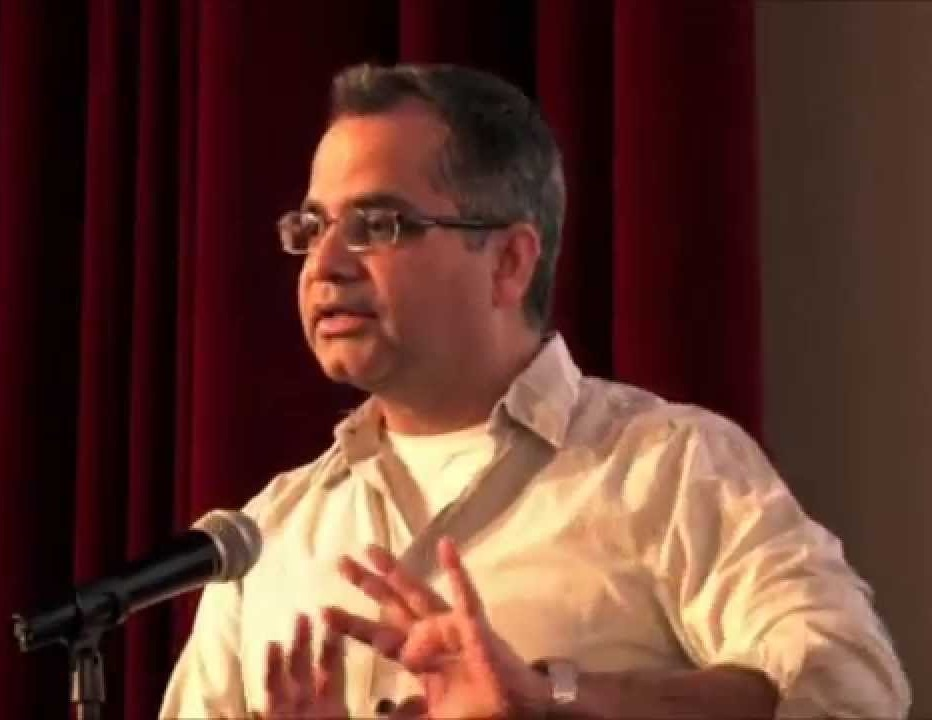
- Chibber at the 2015 Subversive Film Festival in Zagreb, Croatia
- Born: Vivek Aslam Chibber; 1965 (age 60–61); India

Academic background
- Education: University of Wisconsin–Madison; Northwestern University
- Thesis: Locked in Place (1999)
- Doctoral advisor: Erik Olin Wright

Academic work
- Discipline: Sociology
- Sub-discipline: Economic sociology; historical sociology; political sociology; social theory
- School or tradition: Analytical Marxism
- Institutions: New York University
- Doctoral students: David Masondo
- Main interests: Development

Vivek Aslam Chibber (born 1965) is an American academic, social theorist, editor, and professor of sociology at New York University, who has published widely on development, social theory, and politics. Chibber is the author of three books, The Class Matrix: Social Theory after the Cultural Turn (Harvard, 2022), Postcolonial Theory and the Specter of Capital (Verso, 2013) and Locked in Place: State-Building and Late Industrialization in India (Princeton, 2003).

In 2017, Chibber launched Catalyst: A Journal of Theory and Strategy, with Robert Brenner, published by Jacobin magazine.

== Early life and education ==
Chibber was born in India in 1965, and moved to the United States in 1980, where he has lived since. He completed a BA in political science in 1987 at Northwestern University. In 1999, he finished his PhD in sociology at the University of Wisconsin, where his dissertation was supervised by Erik Olin Wright. Chibber began as an assistant professor at New York University in 1999, where he is now a full professor.

== Career ==
Chibber's first book, Locked in Place, attempted to answer why some countries were able to build "developmental states" in the decades after World War II while others were not. He argued that the literature on developmental states had unduly ignored the constraints that class power imposed on state-building, particularly the power and influence of domestic capitalists. Chibber showed that the main reason Indian industrial policy only met with middling success was that domestic capital blocked attempts to build an effective planning apparatus. Whereas in South Korea, the state managed to build an alliance with domestic business houses around industrial planning. Chibber's book was widely acclaimed and won several awards including, in 2005, Barrington Moore Book Award, and honorable mention for the American Sociological Association’s Distinguished Publication Prize.

=== Criticism of postcolonialism ===
Soon after Locked in Place, Chibber's agenda took a turn when, in 2006, he published "On the Decline of Class Analysis in South Asian Studies" in Critical Asian Studies. This article examined the sociological conditions for the decline of class analysis and its displacement by Postcolonial Theory in the South Asian context. While Chibber located the demise of class in the social conditions of the 1980s and 1990s, he did not in this article take on the content of postcolonial theory itself. This engagement came in his second book, Postcolonial Theory and the Specter of Capital (Verso, 2013). In the Preface to the book, Chibber explains that once he examined the conditions that gave rise to postcolonial theory, he felt that he also had to examine its core arguments.

Postcolonial Theory and the Specter of Capital was focused on one particular strand of theorizing, namely the Subaltern Studies collective. Chibber took Subaltern Studies as a representative of the key sociological and historical arguments in postcolonial studies. His basic argument in the book is that, even though postcolonial theory advertises itself as a critique of Orientalism and Eurocentrism, in fact the theory ends up resurrecting them. In other words, postcolonial theory gives new life to Orientalist notions of the Global South, by presenting a highly exoticized and essentialized understanding of it – as fundamentally different from the West, incapable of being understood by Western categories, its people untouched by reason and rationality, etc. Chibber bases his claims on an examination of the Subalternists’ historical sociology as well as their theoretical arguments. He embeds his critique in a defense of the radical Enlightenment tradition as represented by Marx.

The publication of Specter touched off a very intense and wide-ranging debate between Chibber, members of the Subaltern Studies collective, and other intellectuals. Most prominently, Partha Chatterjee and Gayatri Spivak both criticized Chibber for his representation of the Subalternists’ work and postcolonial theory more generally. Chibber responded in turn, denying that he had misrepresented his interlocutors and launching a counterattack of his own.

The ensuing debate was collected and published by Verso Books in 2016 as Rosie Warren (ed.), The Debate on Postcolonial Theory and the Specter of Capital.

=== Catalyst ===
In the spring of 2017, Chibber and (analytical marxism historian) Robert Brenner launched as well as assumed the editorial duties for the journal Catalyst: A Journal of Theory and Strategy. Published by Jacobin Magazine, Chibber and Brenner wrote of their intent for the new publication:

Discussion of capitalism is not off the table any longer. Catalyst: A Journal of Theory and Strategy launches with the aim of doing everything it can to promote and deepen this conversation. Our focus is, as our title suggests, to develop a theory and strategy with capitalism as its target — both in the North and in the Global South. It is an ambitious agenda, but this is a time for thinking big.

=== Other works ===
Chibber has served in editorial roles with various publications and journals, including Socialist Register, Journal of Agrarian Change, Historical Materialism, American Journal of Sociology, The Journal of Peasant Studies, Politics & Society, British Journal of Sociology, and Sociological Theory.

== Awards ==
- Distinguished Publication Award, American Sociological Association 2006, honorable mention.
- Barrington Moore Jr. Prize, American Sociological Association 2005.
- Selected as Outstanding Academic Title in 2004, Choice Magazine
- Mirra Komarovsky Award, Eastern Sociological Association 2005, honorable mention
- Distinguished publication award, Political Sociology Section of the American Sociological Association 2004, for best book in Political Sociology, honorable mention.
- The 2024 Paul Sweezy Outstanding Book Award for The Class Matrix: Social Theory after the Cultural Turn

== Works ==
=== Books ===
- Locked in Place: State-Building and Late Industrialization in India. Princeton University Press. 2003. pp. 334. ISBN 978-0691126234.
- Postcolonial Theory and the Specter of Capital. London: Verso. 2013. pp. 256. ISBN 978-1844679768.
- The Debate on Postcolonial Theory and the Specter of Capital. Verso Books, 1 Nov. 2016. ISBN 1784786950
- Confronting Capitalism: How the World Works and How to Change It. Verso Books, 30 August 2022. ISBN 1839762705
- The Class Matrix: Social Theory after the Cultural Turn. Cambridge, Massachusetts: Harvard University Press. 2022. ISBN 978-0674245136.

=== Journal articles ===
- "Confronting Postcolonial Theory – A Response to Critics". The Journal of World Systems Research. 20 (Winter 2014): 308–314.
- "Making Sense of Postcolonial Studies – A Response to Gayatri Spivak" (PDF). Cambridge Review of International Affairs. 27, no. 3 (September 2014).
- "Revisiting Subaltern Studies" (PDF). The Economic and Political Weekly. XLIX (9). March 1, 2014.
- Chibber, Vivek (2013). "The ghost of theories past". The European Journal of Sociology. 54 (December 2013): 439–449. doi:10.1017/S0003975613000234. JSTOR 43282287.
- "Rescuing Class from the Cultural Turn". Catalyst: A Journal of Theory and Strategy. 1 (Spring 2017): 27–55.

== See also ==
- Dipesh Chakrabarty
