= The Heathen in His Blindness... =

1994 book by S. N. Balagangadhara

"The Heathen in his Blindness..." Asia, the West, and the Dynamic of Religion
- Title page
- Author: S. N. Balagangadhara
- Language: English
- Subject: Religious studies, Social sciences
- Published: 1994 (E. J. Brill); 2005 (Manohar Publishers); 2012 (Manohar Publishers)
- Publication place: India, Europe
- Pages: 563
- ISBN: 90-04-09943-3
- Followed by: Reconceptualizing India Studies (2012)

"The Heathen in his Blindness...": Asia, the West and the Dynamic of Religion by S. N. Balagangadhara, first published in 1994 by E. J. Brill, is a book about religion, culture and cultural difference. Manohar Publishers published a second, hardcover edition of the book in 2005, and a third, paperback, edition in 2012.

== Chapters ==
This book has 12 chapters, an introduction and bibliography.

- - Acknowledgements
- - Introduction
- 1. Some Puzzles and Problems
- 2. "Not by One Avenue Only ..."
- 3. The Whore of Babylon and Other Revelations
- 4. Made in Paris, London, and Heidelberg
- 5. Requiem for a Theme
- 6. "Shall the Twain Ever Meet?"
- 7. "Guilty as Charged, My Lords and Ladies?"
- 8. A Human Tragedy or the Divine Retribution?
- 9. "Blessed Are Those Who Seek"
- 10. "Imagine, There Is No Religion…"
- 11. Prolegomena to a Comparative Science of Cultures
- 12. At the End of a Journey
- - References

== Reception ==
=== Reviews ===
The basic thesis that this book presents, i.e. "that Hinduism does not exist," alters "our notion of Indian culture and social structure fundamentally. This seemingly pulls the carpet out from under the feet of the caste studies.... [But] it does not leave the caste studies reeling helplessly. Rather, it provides a strong conceptual foundation and shows new directions to caste studies."

According to Abu-Dhabi-based newspaper The National:

[In this] ground-breaking work...SN Balagangadhara...wrote a devastating critique of the very language we use today to describe religious phenomena in India. In his book...Balagangadhara questioned whether it is appropriate to use terms like 'religion', 'orthodoxy' and 'Hinduism' at all. He asked whether what are essentially Christian categories may be imputed to non-Western systems of belief and practice without utterly misunderstanding their content and misrepresenting their function."

A review of the Kannada translation of the work claims that Balagangadhara's book has:

...prompted an intellectual revolution of sorts and those who have engaged with the questions he raises in the book cannot escape engaging with the answers he provides as well. To put it strongly—any scholar in the field of cultural studies and its related disciplines, will have to respond to his work.... It traces the history of the two encounters of European culture with other cultures and empirically shows that the existence of religion was assumed both these times. It argues that the ‘universality of religion' is a falsifiable assumption and that religion is not a cultural universal.

=== Understanding the book ===
Scholars have generally found this book difficult to understand. It has also been suggested that it is better to begin by understanding some of the following articles written by S.N. Balagangadhara, as they provide independent arguments and epistemic warrants to the claim that Indian traditions are not religions:

- "How to Speak for the Indian Traditions: An Agenda for the Future" (2005);
- "The Secular State and Religious Conflict: Liberal Neutrality and the Indian Case of Pluralism" (2007);
- "Spirituality in Management Theories: A Perspective from India" (2010).

A detailed chapter-by-chapter questions-and-answers page to understand The Heathen in his Blindness is also available freely on the web.

== Versions ==
=== Abridged version ===
In 2014, Manohar Publishers brought out a condensed and shortened version of The Heathen in His Blindness..., entitled Do all Roads Lead to Jerusalem?: The Making of Indian Religions. Divya Jhingran worked for two years to bring out this simple, easily accessible and a very readable version of the original work.

=== Kannada translation ===
Title page of the Kannada version of the Heathen in his Blindness

A Kannada translation of the book, entitled Smriti-Vismriti: Bharateeya Samskruti (Kannada: ಸ್ಮೃತಿ-ವಿಸ್ಮೃತಿ: ಭಾರತೀಯ ಸಂಸ್ಕೃತಿ), was published in 2010 by Akshara Prakashana (Ninasam), in Heggodu, Karnataka, India. The translation was done by the Centre for the Study of Local Cultures' Rajaram Hegde, who won the 2011 Karnataka Sahitya Academy Award for his translation.
