= S. N. Balagangadhara =

Indian philosopher (born 1952)

- Born: 3 January 1952 (age 74); Bangalore, Mysore State, India

Philosophical work
- Era: 20th-century philosophy
- Region: Western & Indian Philosophy
- School: Vergelijkende Cultuurwetenschap, Comparative Science of Cultures
- Main interests: Religious Studies; Cultural Studies; Post-colonial Studies; Orientalism; Ethics; Political Philosophy; History of ideas South Asian Studies
- Notable ideas: Explanatory Intelligible Account, Colonial Consciousness, Indian Renaissance

S. N. Balagangadhara (aka Balu) is a professor emeritus of the Ghent University in Belgium, and was director of the India Platform and the Research Centre Vergelijkende Cutuurwetenschap (Comparative Science of Cultures).

== Early life and education ==
Balagangadhara was a student of National College, Bangalore and moved to Belgium in 1977 to study philosophy at Ghent University, where he obtained his doctorate under the supervision of Etienne Vermeersch. His doctoral thesis (1991) was entitled Comparative Science of Cultures and the Universality of Religion: An Essay on Worlds without Views and Views without the World.

== Career ==
Balagangadhara's research centers on the comparative study of Western culture against the background of Indian culture; the program has been named "Vergelijkende Cultuurwetenschap / Comparative Science of Cultures". He analyses western culture and intellectual thought through its representations of other cultures, with a particular focus on the western representations of India and attempts to translate the knowledge embodied by the Indian traditions into western conceptual frameworks.

=== Works and reception ===
His first monograph was The Heathen in his Blindness... (1994, Brill).

His second major work, Reconceptualizing India Studies, appeared in 2012 and argues that post-colonial studies and modern India studies are in need of a rejuvenation.

== Honors ==
He has held the co-chair of the Hinduism Unit at the American Academy of Religion (AAR) from 2004 to 2007. On 1 October 2013, University of Pardubice (Czech Republic) awarded him with its honorary doctorate for: (a) the outstanding development of the comparative science of cultures and religions, (b) the development of the collaborations between European and Indian universities, and (c) his contribution to the development of the Studies of religions at the University Faculty of Arts and Philosophy.

== Projects ==
- The development of the Centre for the Study of Local Cultures (CSLC) at Kuvempu University, India.
- The Academy of Social Sciences and Humanities (ĀSHA).
- The five-year Rethinking Religion in India conference cluster.

== Selected publications ==
=== Books ===
- Cultures Differ Differently: Selected Essays of S.N. Balagangadhara. Edited by Jakob De Roover and Sarika Rao. London and New York: Routledge.
- Balagangadhara, S. N.; Rao, Sarika (2021). What Does It Mean to be 'Indian'? Chennai: Indic Academy and Notion Press.
- Balagangadhara, S. N. (1994). "The Heathen in his Blindness..." Asia, the West, and the Dynamic of Religion. Leiden, New York: E. J. Brill. p. 563. ISBN 978-90-04-09943-2. | (Second, revised edition, New Delhi, Manohar, 2005, ISBN 81-7304-608-5) | Preview at Google Books | Find in libraries near you
- Balagangadhara, S. N. (2012). Reconceptualizing India Studies. New Delhi: Oxford University Press. ISBN 978-0-19-808296-5. |
- Balagangadhara, S. N.; Jhingran, Divya (2014). Do All Road Lead to Jerusalem?: The Making of Indian Religions. New Delhi: Manohar. ISBN 978-93-5098-061-3. |

=== Book chapters ===
- Balagangadhara, S. N. & Claerhout, Sarah (2014) "De antieken en het vroege christendom: een heidense visie uit India" in D. Praet & N. Grillaert (Eds.), Christendom en Filosofie. Gent: Academia Press, pp. 51–82
- Balagangadhara, S. N. & De Roover, Jakob (2012) "The Dark Hour of Secularism: Hindu Fundamentalism and Colonial Liberalism in India" in R. Ghosh (Ed.), Making Sense of the Secular: Critical Perspectives from Europe to Asia. New York: Routledge, pp. 111–130
- Balagangadhara, S. N. (2010) "Orientalism, Postcolonialism, and the 'Construction' of Religion" in Bloch, Keppens & Hegde (Eds.), Rethinking Religion in India: The Colonial Construction of Hinduism. New York: Routledge, pp. 135–163
- Balagangadhara, S. N. (2009) "Spirituality in Management Theories: A Perspective from India" in S. Nandram & M. Borden (Eds.) Spirituality and Business: Exploring Possibilities for a New Management Paradigm. Heidelberg: Springer, pp. 45–60
- Balagangadhara, S. N.; Bloch, Esther, De Roover, Jakob (2008), "Rethinking Colonialism and Colonial Consciousness: The Case of Modern India." in S. Raval (Ed.), Rethinking Forms of Knowledge in India. Delhi: Pencraft International, pp. 179–212.
- Balagangadhara, S. N. (2007), "Foreword." In Ramaswamy, de Nicolas & Banerjee (Eds.), Invading the Sacred: An Analysis of Hinduism Studies in America . Delhi: Rupa & Co., pp. vii–xi.
- Balagangadhara, S. N. (2007), "Balagangadhara on the Biblical Underpinnings of 'Secular' Social Sciences." In Ramaswamy, de Nicolas & Banerjee (Eds.), Invading the Sacred: An Analysis of Hinduism Studies in America . Delhi: Rupa & Co., pp. 123–31.
- Balagangadhara, S. N. (2007), "India and her Traditions: A Reply to Jeffrey Kripal." In Ramaswamy, de Nicolas & Banerjee (Eds.), Invading the Sacred: An Analysis of Hinduism Studies in America . Delhi: Rupa & Co., pp. 429–447.
- Balagangadhara, S. N. (2006), "Secularisation as the Harbinger of Religious Violence in India: Hybridisation, Hindutva and Post-coloniality." In Schirmer, Saalmann & Kessler (Eds.), Hybridising East and West, Tales Beyond Westernisation. Empirical Contributions to the Debates on Hybridity. Berlin: Lit Verlag, pp. 145–182.
- Balagangadhara, S. N. (1991) "The Reality of the Elusive Man?" In Nispen & Tiemersma (Eds.), The Quest of Man: The Topicality of Philosophical Anthropology. Assen: von Gorcum, pp. 112–116
- Balagangadhara, S. N. & Pinxten, R. (1989), "Comparative Anthropology and Rhetorics in Cultures". In Maier, Robert (Ed.), Norms in Argumentation. Dordrecht: Foris, pp. 195–211.

=== Articles ===
- Balagangadhara, S. N. (2014). "On the Dark Side of the "Secular": Is the Religious-Secular Distinction a Binary?". Numen. 61 (1): 33–52. doi:10.1163/15685276-12341303. hdl:1854/LU-7124830.
- De Roover, Jakob; Sarah Claerhout; S. N. Balagangadhara (2011). "Liberal Political Theory and the Cultural Migration of Ideas: The Case of Secularism in India". Political Theory. 39 (5): 571–599. doi:10.1177/0090591711413545. hdl:1854/LU-1870111. S2CID 145178856.
- Gelders, Raf; S. N. Balagangadhara (2011). "Rethinking Orientalism: Colonialism and the Study of Indian Traditions" (PDF). History of Religions. 51 (2): 101–128. doi:10.1086/660928. hdl:1854/LU-946907. S2CID 161444251.
- Balagangadhara, S. N.; Jakob De Roover (2010). "The Saint, the Criminal and the Terrorist: Towards a Hypothesis on Terrorism". The Journal of Political Philosophy. 18 (1): 1–15. doi:10.1111/j.1467-9760.2009.00336.x.
- De Roover, Jakob; S. N. Balagangadhara (2009). "Liberty, Tyranny and the Will of God: The Principle of Toleration in Early Modern Europe and Colonial India". History of Political Thought. 30 (1): 111–139.
- Balagangadhara, S. N.; Marianne Keppens (2009). "Reconceptualizing the Postcolonial Project: Beyond the Strictures and Structures of Orientalism". Interventions. 11 (1): 50–68. doi:10.1080/13698010902752731. S2CID 142551230.
- De Roover, Jakob; S. N. Balagangadhara (2008). "John Locke, Christian Liberty, and the Predicament of Liberal Toleration". Political Theory. 36 (4): 523–549. doi:10.1177/0090591708317969. hdl:1854/LU-429418. S2CID 145306818.
- Balagangadhara, S. N. (2008). "Comparing India and the West" (PDF). ASIANetwork Exchange. XVI (1): 57–63.
- Balagangadhara, S. N.; Sarah Claerhout (2008). "Are Dialogues Antidotes to Violence? Two Recent Examples from Hinduism Studies" (PDF). Journal for the Study of Religions and Ideologies. 7 (19): 118–143. Archived from the original (PDF) on 20 August 2009.
- Balagangadhara, S. N.; Jakob De Roover (2007). "The Secular State and Religious Conflict: Liberal Neutrality and the Indian Case of Pluralism". The Journal of Political Philosophy. 15 (1): 67–92. doi:10.1111/j.1467-9760.2007.00268.x. hdl:1854/LU-364874.
- Balagangadhara, S. N. (2005). "How to Speak for the Indian Traditions". Journal of the American Academy of Religion. 73 (4): 987–1013. doi:10.1093/jaarel/lfi112.
- Balagangadhara, S. N. (1998). "The Future of the Present: Thinking Through Orientalism". Cultural Dynamics. 10 (2): 101–23. doi:10.1177/092137409801000202. S2CID 147360540.
- Balagangadhara, S. N. (1990). "The Origin of Religion: Why is the Issue Dead?". Cultural Dynamics. 3 (3): 281–316. doi:10.1177/092137409000300303. S2CID 144204300.
- Balagangadhara, S. N. (1990). "Understanding and Imagination: A Critical Notice of Halbfass and Inden". Cultural Dynamics. 3 (4): 387–405. doi:10.1177/092137409000300403. hdl:1854/LU-735390. S2CID 144760328.
- Balagangadhara, S. N. (1988). "Comparative Anthropology and Moral Domains: An Essay on Selfless Morality and the Moral Self". Cultural Dynamics. 1 (1): 98–128. doi:10.1177/092137408800100106. hdl:1854/LU-735393. S2CID 143167470.
- Balagangadhara, S. N. (1987). "Comparative Anthropology and Action Science: An Essay on Knowing to Act and Acting to Know" (PDF). Philosophica. 40 (2): 77–107. doi:10.21825/philosophica.82484. ISSN 0379-8402. S2CID 247442293.
