= Centre for the Study of Local Cultures =

Research centre in India

The Centre for the Study of Local Cultures (CSLC), better known as the CSLC, is a research centre at Kuvempu University located in the rural village Shankaraghatta in the Shimoga district of Karnataka (India). It was founded in 2004-2005.

Logo of the Research centre

The study of local cultures in India had traditionally been confined to the approaches of departments of folk culture, English literature and socio-anthropological studies. The Centre for the Study of Local Cultures (CSLC) was set up by members of Kuvempu University and the Research Centre Vergelijkende Cultuurwetenschap in Belgium to move the study of local cultures beyond these confines and into a broader framework of interdisciplinary studies. Financial assistance for the project was provided by the Flemish Interuniversity Council – VLIR. The centre's stated long-term goal is to become an internationally renowned research centre on South-Indian culture and society with deep links to the local society and its cultural traditions.

== Brief history ==
The idea of developing a Centre for the Study of Local Cultures (CSLC) took shape in four phases: (a) Over the course of 4 years ( 2004–2007), a joint research project on caste and community in the rural areas of Karnataka was carried out at Kuvempu University. Its success led to the idea of developing a research centre at the University. The collaboration also identified several problems in the social sciences: the near absence of a social scientific research culture, the detachment of the dominant theories from local society, the absence of research training, and limited access to relevant literature. (b) In 2005, a VLIR Zuidinitiatief was initiated, which trained some of the faculty from the School of Social Sciences at Kuvempu University. This project resulted in the creation of a research group and a small library in the CSLC, which now has separate rooms at the University. Ghent and Kuvempu University also collaborated on writing a VLIR-IUC proposal, which included the plan of developing the CSLC. Although the proposal was not selected, the VLIR Bureau UOS valued its social sciences component and suggested transforming this component into an Own Initiative. In November 2005, several meetings took place at Kuvempu to discuss the nature of this proposal and the future development of the CSLC. At these meetings, the team proposed creating an Academy of Social Sciences and Humanities (ASHA, formerly KASSH), which would address the crisis of the social sciences at the state level. These discussions laid the foundations for the Letter of Intent. (c) In June 2006, an EC Asia-Link project on stereotypical images and cultural differences between Europe and South Asia began. The EC project aimed to establish a large-scale educational network between 5 universities, including Kuvempu University. Within the project, 5 research scholars belonging to the CSLC team were trained in teaching and research. (d) In August 2006, the first activity of the Asia-Link project brought the entire Kuvempu University team to Ghent. This enabled discussions about the future of the CSLC, the idea of the ASHA, and the full-fledged VLIR Own Initiatives proposal. The then Vice-Chancellor and the Registrar of Kuvempu University visited Ghent to discuss the content of the final proposal and to negotiate an MoU and a Cooperation Agreement. The Ghent team organised a PCM workshop with the Kuvempu team, where detailed stakeholder, problem and objective analyses took place. This resulted in a modified logical framework and the final formulation of the proposal.

== Research scholars and their research areas ==
1. Santhosh Kumar PK, Castes and Rituals

2. Praveen TL, Novels and Social Sciences

3. Mahesh Kumar CS, Sufi Tradition

4. Kavitha PN, Problems of Caste Classification

5. Shankarappa NS, Dalit Consciousness

6. Shivu Kumar, Kannada Literature and the Representation of Society

== Scholars and faculty working in the institution ==
Chief Promoter: Prof. S.N. Balagangadhara, Ghent University,

Local Promoter: Prof. J.S. Sadananda, Professor of Political Science, Kuvempu University

Director: Prof. Rajaram Hegde, Professor of History, Kuvempu University

Deputy Director: Dr. Shanmukha A, Lecturer in Political Science, Kuvempu University

Research Coordinator: Dr. Dunkin Jalki, University of Pardubice

Programme Officer: Mr. Sandeep Kumar Shetty, India Platform, Bangalore

Administrator: Mr. Indudhara
