= Jacobin (magazine) =

American socialist magazine

- Issue 11/12 (fall 2013)
- Publisher: Remeike Forbes
- Categories: Politics, culture
- Frequency: Quarterly
- Paid circulation: 75,000
- Unpaid circulation: >3 million (online monthly)
- Founder: Bhaskar Sunkara
- First issue: 2010
- Country: United States
- Based in: New York City
- Language: English
- Website: jacobin.com
- ISSN: 2158-2602
- OCLC: 677928766

Jacobin is an American socialist magazine based in New York City, founded in 2010 by Bhaskar Sunkara. As of 2023, the magazine reported a paid print circulation of 75,000 and over 3 million monthly online visitors.

== History and overview ==
The publication began as an online magazine released in September 2010, expanding into a print journal later that year. Jacobin founder Bhaskar Sunkara said that he intended for Jacobin to perform a similar role on the contemporary left to that undertaken by National Review on the post-war right, i.e. "to cohere people around a set of ideas, and to interact with the mainstream of liberalism with that set of ideas". In 2016, the Columbia Journalism Review called it "most successful American ideological magazine to launch in the past decade".

Jacobin's popularity grew with the increasing attention on leftist ideas stimulated by Bernie Sanders' 2016 presidential campaign, with subscriptions tripling from 10,000 in the summer of 2015 to 32,000 as of the first issue of 2017, with 16,000 new subscribers being added in the two months after Donald Trump's election.

In spring 2017, Jacobin launched a peer-reviewed journal, Catalyst: A Journal of Theory and Strategy, which is today edited by New York University professor Vivek Chibber and a small editorial board. As of 2022, Catalyst claims a subscriber base of 7,500.

In November 2018, the magazine's first foreign-language edition, Jacobin Italia, was launched. Sunkara described it as "a classic franchise model", with the parent publication providing publishing and editorial advice and taking a small slice of revenue, but otherwise granting the Italian magazine autonomy. Today, other editions are published in Argentina, Brazil, Germany, Greece, and the Netherlands.

== Title and logo ==
The name of the magazine derives from the 1938 book The Black Jacobins about the history of the Haitian Revolution by historian C. L. R. James which frames the revolution in the context of the French Revolution, and focusing particularly on the leadership of Toussaint L'Ouverture, who was born a slave but rose to prominence espousing the French Revolutionary ideals of liberty and equality. James writes of the persecuted black Haitians that those ideals "meant far more to them" than they could have to the French Jacobins.

Creative director Remeike Forbes described the process of designing the magazine's "Black Jacobin" logo – a stylized profile-view portrait of Toussaint L'Ouverture – taking inspiration from L'Ouverture's life, the book The Black Jacobins, and a scene in the 1969 film Queimada!, when the Nicaraguan revolutionary leader José Dolores Estrada is captured by the British forces. Forbes, himself a black Jamaican immigrant, described the "anxiety" of the editorial board when initially presented with the design: "There was some concern over the use of a black person as our mascot, and the inherent potential to cause offense. It was a legitimate concern, given the fact black people have a dicey history as visual identities, hardly advancing past the boxes of Aunt Jemima and Uncle Ben. [...] Yet that very anxiety demonstrated the significance of adopting this image. The perversity was in presenting a black person as a universal subject, an honor only ever accorded to the white visage." He also found the Haitian Revolution to be a great "signifier of universalism", writing, "The Haitian Revolution encapsulates the historic mission of the Left: that is, the truest realization of the Enlightenment. That those ideals, wrested from the hypocrites who hawk them and seized by the wretched of the earth, can become a radical project for human emancipation."

== Contributors ==
Sunkara has said he feels that "all of our writers fit within a broad socialist tradition", noting that the magazine does sometimes publish articles by liberals and social democrats, but that such pieces are written from a perspective that is consistent with the magazine's editorial vision.

Notable Jacobin contributors have included:

- Kareem Abdul-Jabbar
- Jeremy Corbyn
- Shawn Fain
- Kristen Ghodsee
- Pablo Iglesias Turrión
- Zohran Mamdani
- Yanis Varoufakis
- Hilary Wainwright
- Slavoj Žižek

== Ideology ==
Jacobin has been variously described as democratic socialist, socialist and Marxist. Writing for the New Statesman in November 2013, Max Strasser suggested that Jacobin claims to "take the mantle of Marxist thought of Ralph Miliband and a similar vein of democratic socialism". According to an article published in September 2014 by the Nieman Journalism Lab, Jacobin is a journal of "democratic socialist thought". Jacobin's own "Essential Guide to Jacobin," published in 2023, states that "[o]ne of Jacobin’s primary goals from the beginning has been to popularize the idea of democratic socialism."

In January 2013, The New York Times ran a profile of Bhaskar Sunkara, commenting on the publication's unexpected success and engagement with mainstream liberalism. In an October 2013 article for Tablet, Michelle Goldberg discussed Jacobin as part of a revival of interest in Marxism among young intellectuals. In February 2016, Jake Blumgart, who contributed to the magazine in its early years, stated that it "found an audience by mixing data-driven analysis and Marxist commentary with an irreverent and accessible style".

In a 2014 interview published in New Left Review, Sunkara named a number of ideological influences on the magazine, including Michael Harrington, whom he described as "very underrated as a popularizer of Marxist thought"; Ralph Miliband and others such as Leo Panitch who were influenced by Trotskyism without fully embracing it; theorists working in the Eurocommunist tradition; and "Second International radicals" including Vladimir Lenin and Karl Kautsky. Additionally, some of the main writers, such as Vivek Chibber, Ben Burgis, follow an analytical Marxism perspective, represented by analytic philosophy such as G. A. Cohen. Dylan Matthews, writing for Vox in 2016, described the ideology of Jacobin as broadly socialist and ideologically ecumenical, noting that the magazine deliberately avoids rigid factionalism and party lines to create a space where "social democrats, democratic socialists, Trotskyists, council communists, Chavistas, and even the odd liberal can coexist".

In a March 2018 article published in the Weekly Worker, Jim Creegan highlighted the association of a number of the magazine's editors and writers with the Democratic Socialists of America (DSA) while also stressing the political diversity of contributors, incorporating "everyone from social democratic liberals to avowed revolutionaries".

== Catalyst ==
Associated with Jacobin, Catalyst: A Journal of Theory and Strategy is a quarterly interdisciplinary academic journal covering left-wing politics, capitalism, and Marxist theory. Established in the spring of 2017 as a collaboration between editors Vivek Chibber, Robert Brenner, and Jacobin, Catalyst attempts to "promote wide-ranging discussion and to organized debate on the urgent questions facing the working class, the emergent mass movements, and radical and socialist political organizations." Sunkara has described Catalyst as "a more theoretical journal, a more academic journal" compared to Jacobin.

In 2015, Chibber and Brenner approached Bhaskar Sunkara about the possibility of publishing a theoretical journal of socialist politics where Chibber and Brenner would assume editorial control, while Jacobin would design, produce, and circulate the journal. The intention of Catalyst was to address and compensate for a perceived generational gap in left-wing politics after the New Left, taking up political questions commonly explored in the past by the American left and readdressing them to the millennial audience that makes up the Jacobin readership. The first issue of Catalyst was officially released in May 2017 at a celebration at the In These Times offices in Chicago.
