= Brazilian Armed Forces =

Combined military forces of Brazil

- Forças Armadas Brasileiras
- Emblem of the Joint General Staff of the Armed Forces

- Flag of the Joint General Staff of the Armed Forces
- Service branches: Army; Navy; Air Force
- Headquarters: Ministry of Defense, Brasília

Leadership
- Commander-in-Chief: President Luiz Inácio Lula da Silva
- Minister of Defence: José Múcio
- Chief of the Joint Chiefs of Staff: Renato Freire

Personnel
- Military age: 18–45 years of age for compulsory military service for men
- Conscription: 10 to 12 months
- Active personnel: 376,000
- Reserve personnel: 1,340,000

Expenditure
- Budget: US$24.8 billion (2023)
- Percent of GDP: 1,1% (2023)

Related articles
- History: Military history of Brazil; Warfare directory of Brazil; Wars involving Brazil; Battles involving Brazil
- Ranks: Military ranks of Brazil

The Brazilian Armed Forces (Portuguese: Forças Armadas Brasileiras, IPA: [ˈfoʁsɐz ɐʁˈmadɐz bɾaziˈlejɾɐs]) are the unified military forces of the Federative Republic of Brazil. They consist of three service branches, the Brazilian Army, Brazilian Navy and Brazilian Air Force.

Brazil's armed forces are the second largest in the Americas, after the United States, and the largest in Latin America and the Southern Hemisphere by the level of military equipment, with 334,500 active-duty troops and officers. Brazilian soldiers were in Haiti from 2004 until 2017, leading the United Nations Stabilization Mission (MINUSTAH).

== Organization ==
The Armed Forces of Brazil are divided into 3 branches:

- Brazilian Army
- Brazilian Navy
- Brazilian Air Force

The Military Police (state police) alongside the Military Firefighters Corps are described as an auxiliary and reserve force of the Army. All military branches are part of the Ministry of Defence.

The Brazilian Navy which is the oldest of the Brazilian Armed Forces, includes the Brazilian Marine Corps and the Brazilian Naval Aviation.

=== Service obligation and manpower ===
There is compulsory military service for those aged 18–45; conscript service obligation – 10 to 12 months; voluntary service is allowed from age 17–45. An increasing percentage of the ranks are "long-service" volunteer professionals; women were allowed to serve in the armed forces beginning in the early 1980s when the Brazilian Army became the first army in South America to accept women into career ranks; women serve in Navy and Air Force only in Women's Reserve Corps.

=== Mission and challenges ===
South America is a relatively peaceful continent in which wars are a rare event; as a result, Brazil has not had its territory invaded since 1865 during the Paraguayan War. Additionally, Brazil lacks contested territorial disputes with any of its neighbours and neither does it have rivalries, like Chile and Bolivia have with each other. However, Brazil is the only country besides China and Russia that has land borders with 10 or more nations. Moreover, Brazil has 16,880 kilometers (10,490 mi) of land borders and 7,367 km (4,578 mi) of coastline to be patrolled and defended. Overall, the Armed Forces have to defend 8.5 million km^{2} (around 3.2 million sq. mi.) of land and patrol 4.4 million km^{2} (around 1.7 million sq. mi.) of territorial waters – or Blue Amazon, as the Brazilian Navy calls them. To achieve this mission, significant manpower and funding is required.

== Military history of Brazil ==
Since 1648 the Brazilian Armed Forces have been relied upon to fight in defense of Brazilian sovereignty and to suppress civil rebellions. The Brazilian military also has several times intervened militarily to overthrow the Brazilian government.

The Brazilian Armed Forces were subordinated to the Emperor, its Commander-in-Chief. He was aided by the Ministers of War and Navy in regard to matters concerning the Army and the Armada, respectively. Traditionally, the Ministers of War and Navy were civilians but there were some exceptions. The model chosen was the British parliamentary or Anglo-American system, in which "the country's Armed Forces observed unrestricted obedience to the civilian government while maintaining distance from political decisions and decisions referring to borders' security".

The military personnel were allowed to run and serve in political offices while staying on active duty. However, they did not represent the Army or the Armada but instead the population of the city or province where elected. Dom Pedro I chose nine military personnel as Senators and five (out of 14) to the State Council. During the Regency, two were chosen to the Senate and none to the State Council as there was no Council at the time. Dom Pedro II chose four military personnel to become Senators during the 1840s, two in the 1850s and three until the end of his reign. He also chose seven military personnel to be State Counselors during the 1840s and 1850s and three after that.

It has built a tradition of participating in UN peacekeeping missions such as in Haiti and East Timor. Below a list of some of the historical events in which the Brazilian Armed Forces took part:

=== Armed conflicts involving Brazil ===
- First Battle of Guararapes (1648): Decisive Portuguese victory that helped end Dutch occupation. Due to this battle, the year 1648 is considered as the year of the foundation of the Brazilian Army.
- Invasion of Cayenne (1809) (1809) : Was a combined military operation by an Anglo-Portuguese expeditionary force against Cayenne, capital of the French South American colony of French Guiana in 1809, during the Napoleonic Wars.
- Luso-Brazilian invasion (1816–1820) : Was an armed conflict between the United Kingdom of Portugal, Brazil and the Algarves and the partisans of José Artigas over the Banda Oriental (Eastern Bank), present-day Uruguay.
- Brazilian War of Independence (1822–1824): Series of military campaigns that had as objective to cement Brazilian sovereignty and end Portuguese resistance.
- Confederation of the Equator (1824) : Was a short-lived rebellion that occurred in the northeastern region of Brazil during that nation's struggle for independence from Portugal.
- Cisplatine War (1825–1828) : Armed conflict over an area known as Banda Oriental or "Eastern Shore" between the United Provinces of the Río de la Plata and Empire of Brazil in the aftermath of the United Provinces' emancipation from Spain.
- Ragamuffin War (1835–1845) : Was a Republican uprising that began in southern Brazil, in the states of Rio Grande do Sul and Santa Catarina in 1835. The rebels, led by Generals Bento Gonçalves da Silva and Antônio de Sousa Neto with the support of the Italian fighter Giuseppe Garibaldi, surrendered to imperial forces in 1845.
- Platine War (1851–1852): The Brazilian Empire and its allies went to war against the dictator Juan Manuel de Rosas of the Argentine Confederation.
- Uruguayan War (1864–1865): Brazilian intervention in Uruguay. With support from Argentina, imperial forces deposed President Atanasio Aguirre from office and instated general Venancio Flores in his place.
- Paraguayan War (1864–1870): Over 200,000 Brazilians fought on this conflict, which is considered as the most serious in Brazilian history.
- Brazilian Naval Revolt (1893–1894) : Armed mutinies promoted mainly by Admirals Custodio de Mello and Saldanha da Gama and their fleet of Brazilian Navy ships revolted against unconstitutional continuance of power by the central government in Rio de Janeiro.
- War of Canudos (1893–1897): The deadliest rebellion of Brazil, the insurrectionists defeated the first 3 military forces sent to quell the rebellion.
- Contestado War (1912–1916) : Was a guerrilla war for land between settlers and landowners, the latter supported by the Brazilian state's police and military forces. The war lasted from October 1912 to August 1916.
- Brazil during World War I: Brazil entered into World War I on October 26, 1917 alongside the Triple Entente after German submarines torpedoed several Brazilian ships. Brazilian troops and paramedics were deployed in France, but the Brazilian navy didn't arrive in Europe until November 10, 1918, one day before the Armistice.
- Constitutionalist Revolution (1932) : Was the armed movement occurred in the State of São Paulo, Brazil, between July and October 1932, which aimed at the overthrow of the Provisional Government of Getúlio Vargas and the promulgation of a new constitution for Brazil.
- Brazil in World War II (1942–1945): Brazil declared war on Nazi Germany in August 1942 and in 1944 sent an Expeditionary Force of 25,334 soldiers to fight in Italy. Brazil also supplied vital raw materials for the war effort and ceded important airbases at Natal and Fernando de Noronha Archipel that made possible the North African invasion, i.e. Operation Torch, and had a key role in patrolling the South Atlantic sea lanes.

Brazilian Expeditionary Force, initially composed of an infantry division, eventually covered all Brazilian military forces who participated in the conflict, including the Brazilian Air Force who did a remarkable job in the last nine months of war with 445 missions executed. Offensive: 2546, Defensive: 4.

=== Brazilian military coups d'état ===
The Republican period experienced several military coups d'état from 1889 to 1964, such as:

- Proclamation of the Republic (1889): End of the Brazilian Empire, this was the first coup d'état by the Brazilian military.
- Revolution of 1930: Second military overthrow of government, in which President Washington Luís was replaced by Getúlio Vargas, who became the Provisional President.
- End of Estado Novo (1945): Then Dictator Getúlio Vargas was deposed by generals and General Eurico Dutra was elected president.
- 1964 Brazilian coup d'état: President João Goulart was removed from office, leading to a military dictatorship which lasted until 1985.

== Ministry of Defence ==
José Múcio, the current defence minister.

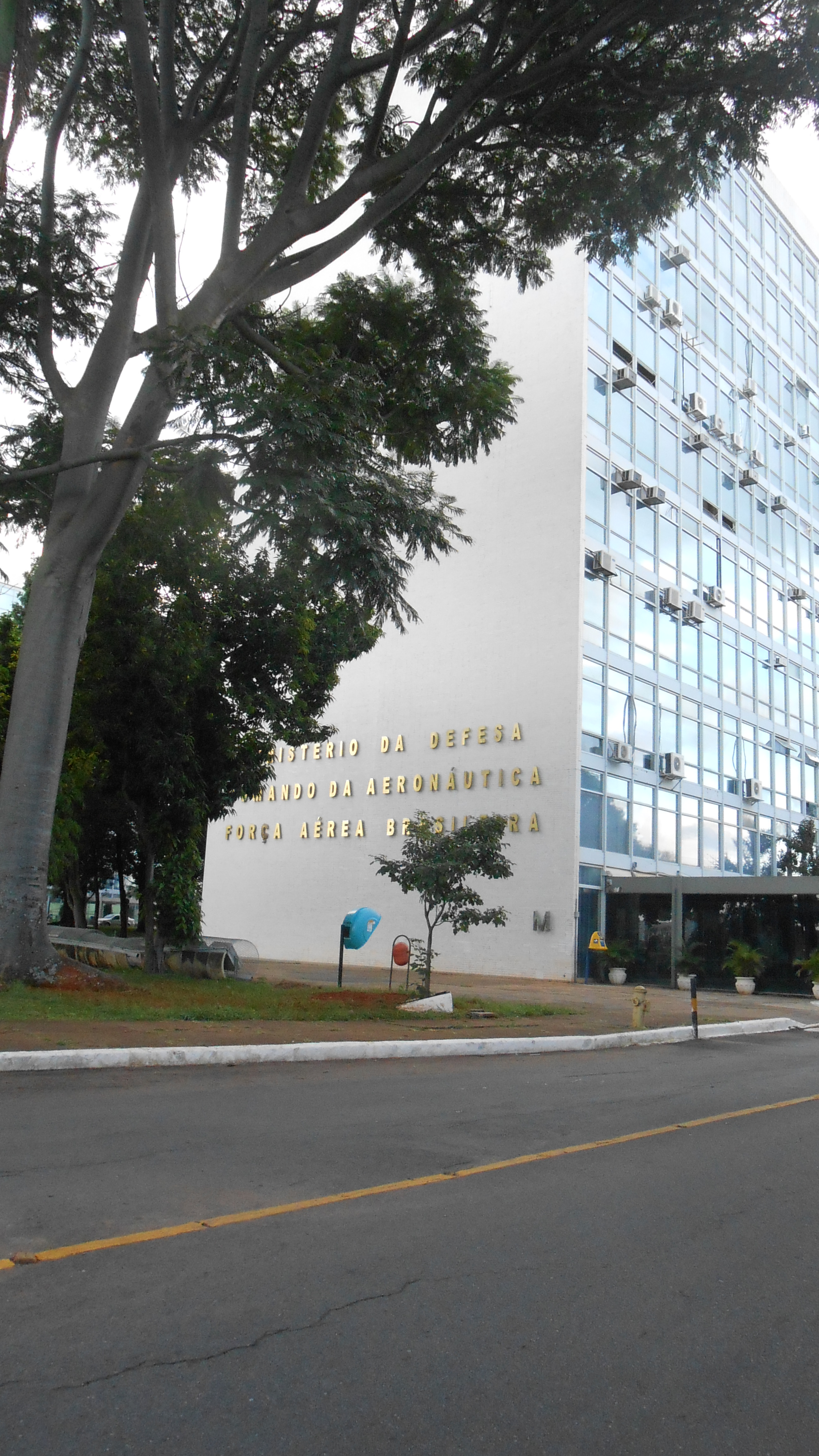
Ministry of Defense of Brazil

On 10 July 1999, the Ministry of Defence was created, with the abolition of the EMFA and the merger of all three ministries of the Armed Forces (Army, Navy and Air Force) into a singular ministry of the Cabinet.

=== Joint Staff of the Armed Forces ===
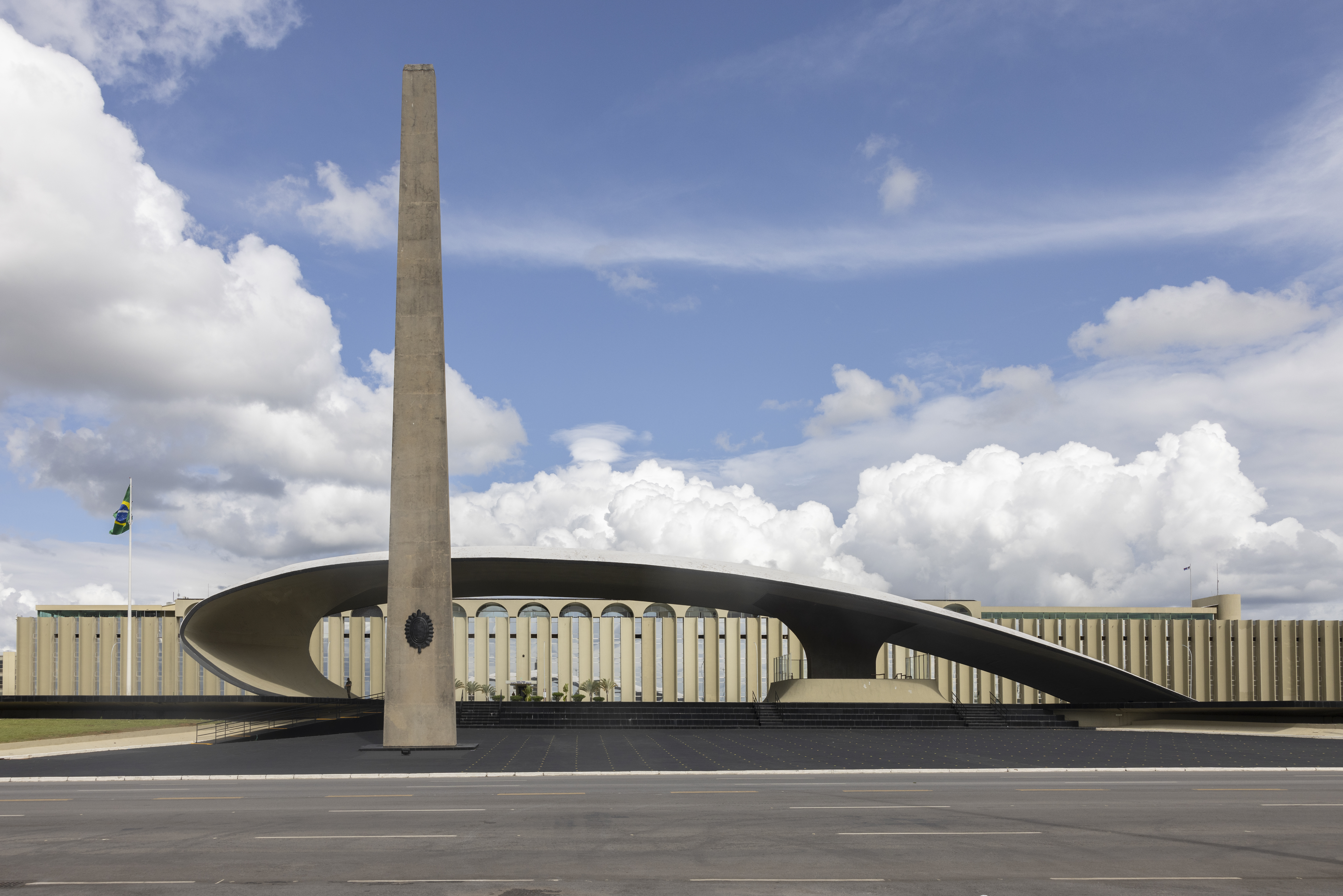
Army High Command HQ in Brasília

Joint Staff of the Armed Forces is an agency of the Ministry of Defense of Brazil, which centralizes the coordination of command of the armed forces: Army, Navy and Air Force. It was created by Complementary Law No. 136 of 25 August 2010, and has in Ordinance No. 1429 its operating guidelines.

Advising the Minister of Defense in the upper direction of the armed forces, aiming the organization, preparation and employment, in order to fulfill its constitutional mission and its subsidiaries assignments, with the goals strategic planning and the joint use of the military services.

It is up to JSAF plan together and integrated employment of staff of the Navy, Army and Air Force, optimizing the use of the military and logistical support in the defense of the country and in peacekeeping, humanitarian and rescue operations; border security; and civil defense actions.

The body has its powers and duties according to the Regimental Structure approved by Decree 7.9744, April 1, 2013. Since its inception, the JSAF has worked with the Central Administration of the Ministry of Defence, on the Esplanade of Ministries in Brasilia (DF).

The head of the JSAF is private of a general officer of the last post, active or reserve, designated by the Ministry of Defence and appointed by the president. Their hierarchical level is the same of the military commanders of the Navy, Army and Air Force. Under the coordination of the Joint Armed Forces also operates the Committee of Chiefs of Staffs of the military services.

The current head of JSAF is the Admiral Renato Rodrigues de Aguiar Freire.

== Brazilian Army ==
The Army High Command of Brazil is formed by the Army Commander and other army generals in active service. The country current has sixteen active 4-star generals, several of them in command posts. The mission of ACE includes the selection of a list of candidates to the post of commander, the prospection of regional and global political situations, among others roles.

=== FORPRON ===
The Brazilian Army Readiness Forces (Forças de Prontidão do Exército Brasileiro in Portuguese) is a 15,000-strong division meant to operate in real missions of conventional combat, law and order and interagency operations within the Brazilian territory or as divisional forces abroad led by officers from the General Staff of the Readiness Forces subordinate to the Army High Command.

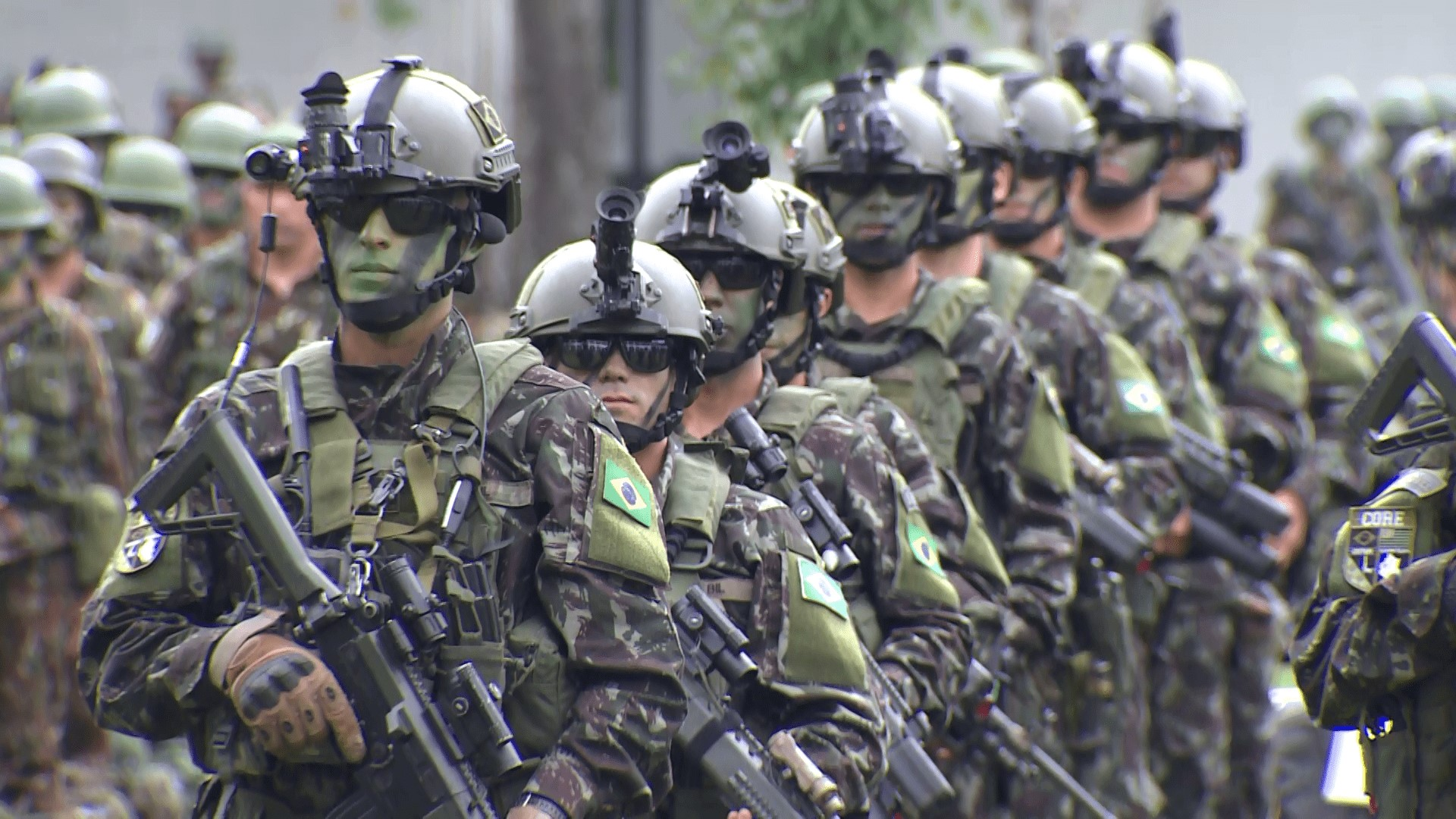
Brazilian Army Infantry

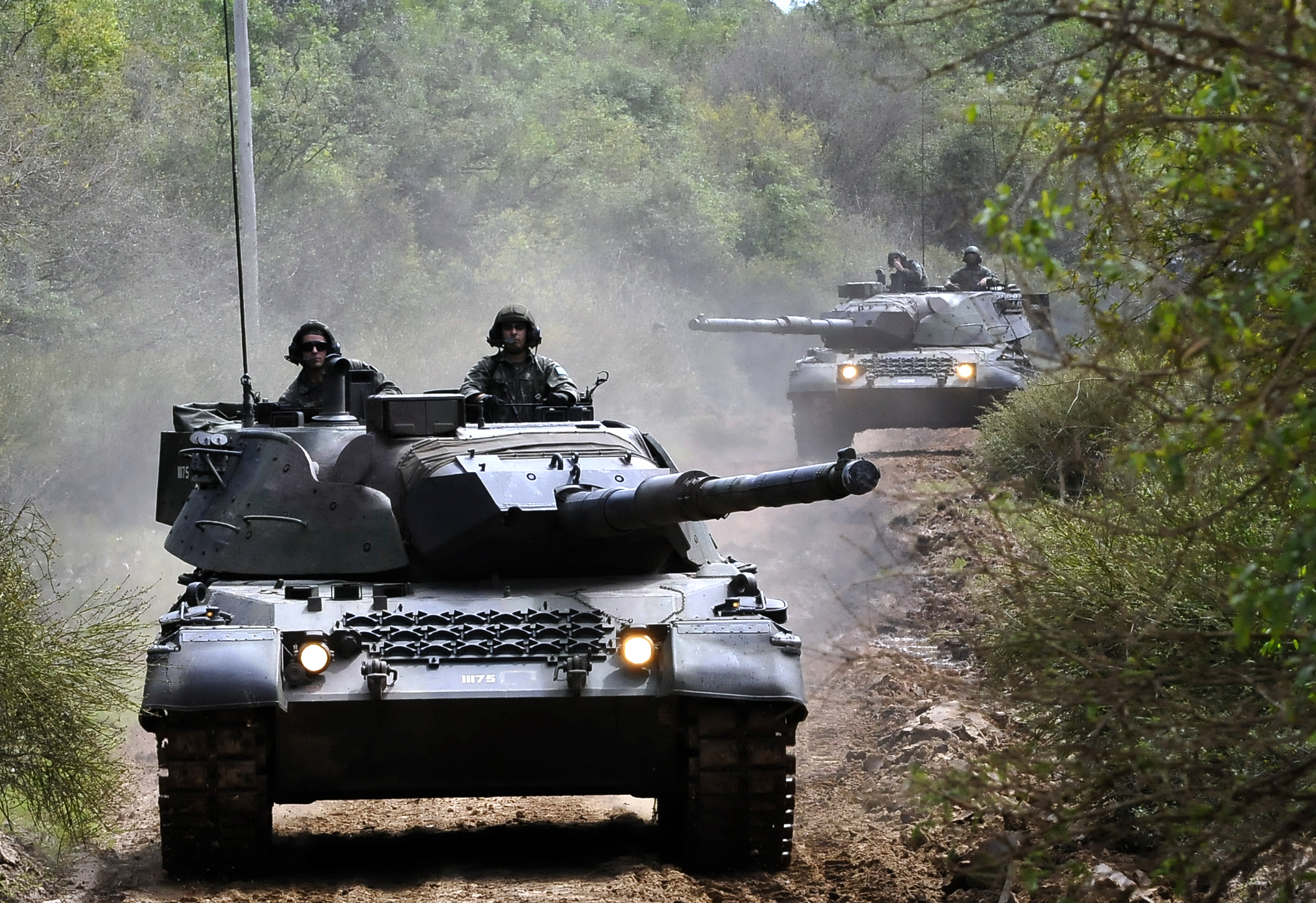
Leopard 1A5 main battle tank

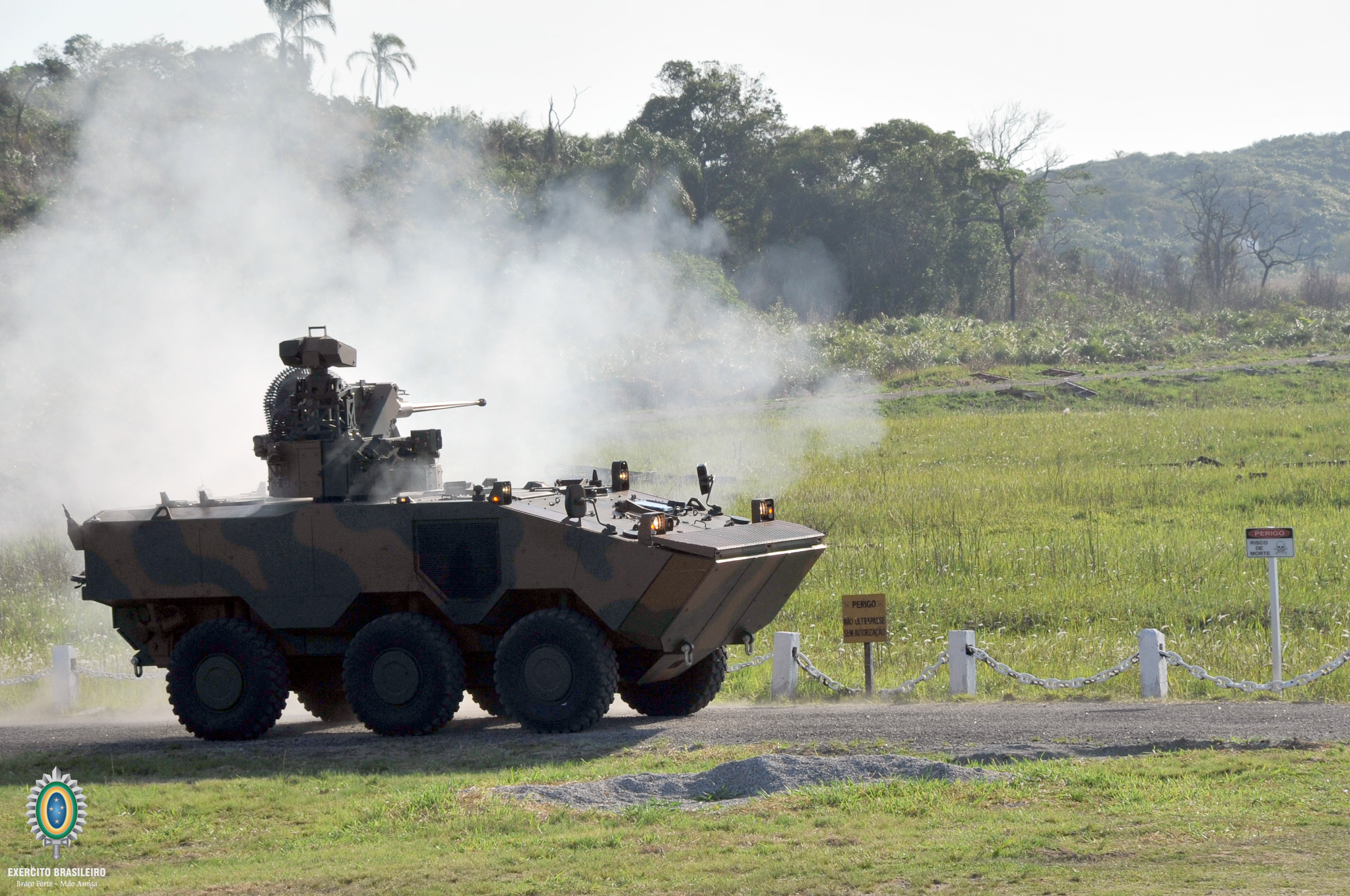
Brazilian VBTP-MR Guarani IFVs

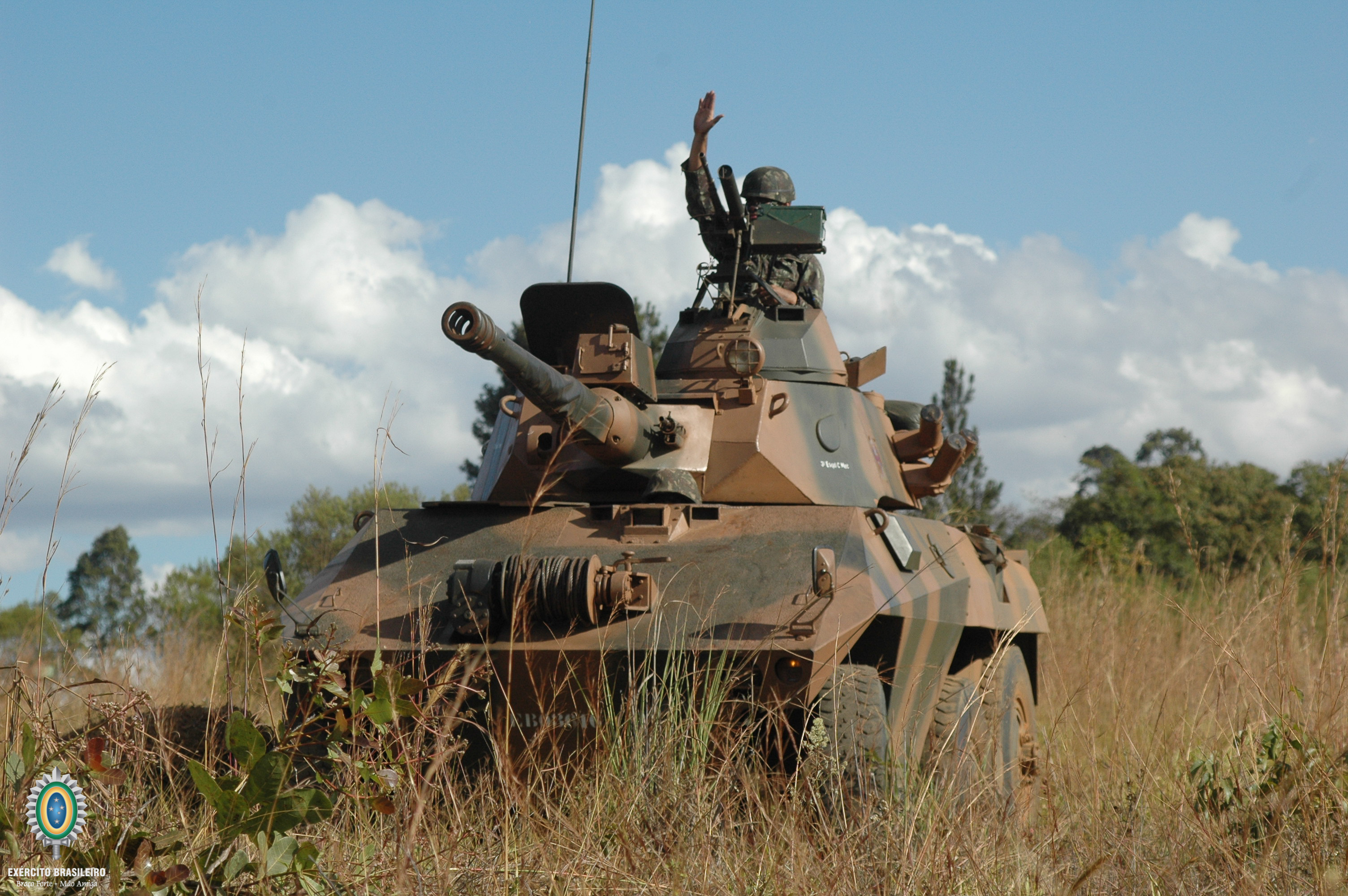
EE-9 Cascavel armored reconnaissance

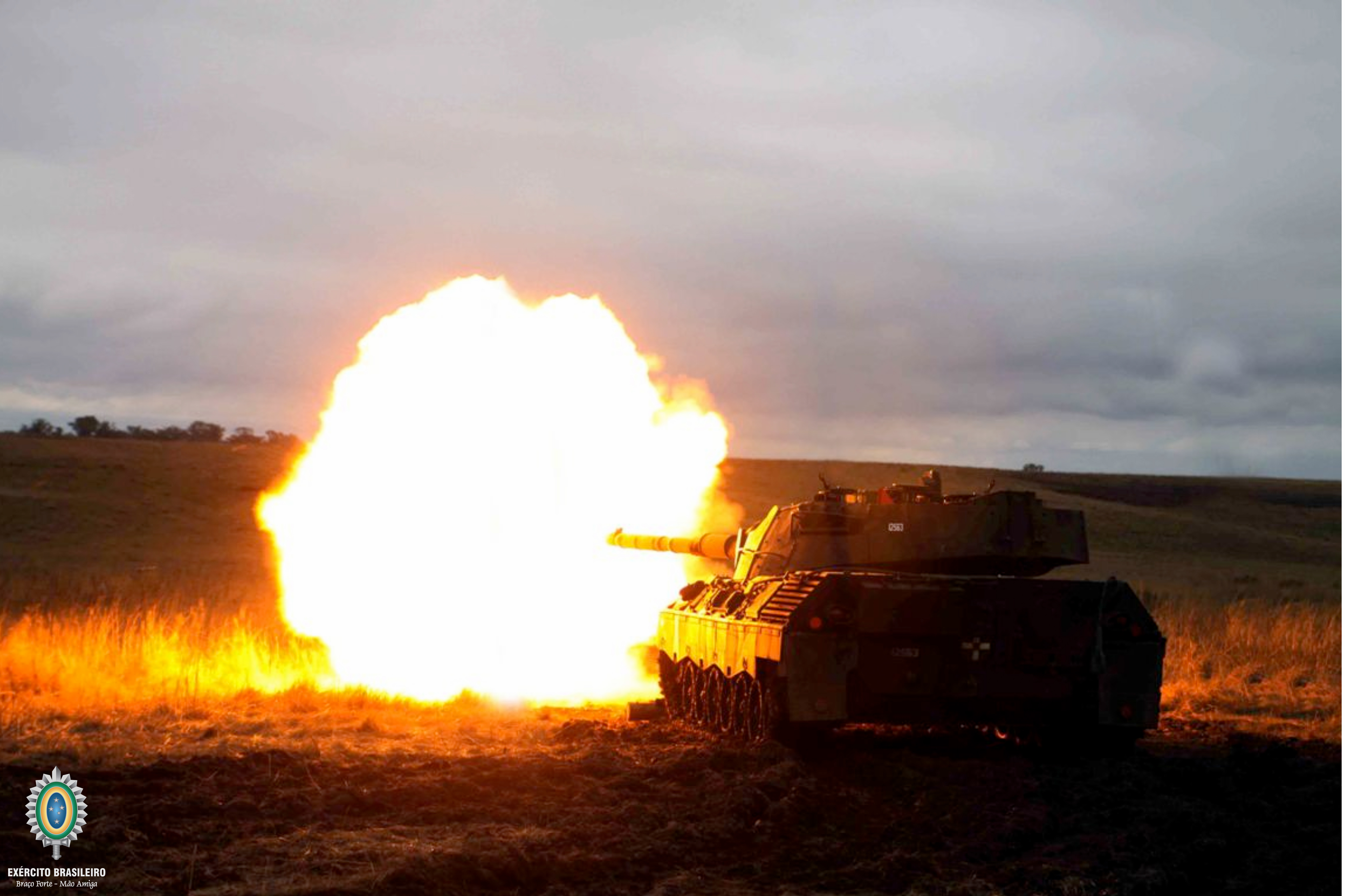
Leopard 1A5 in night shooting exercise

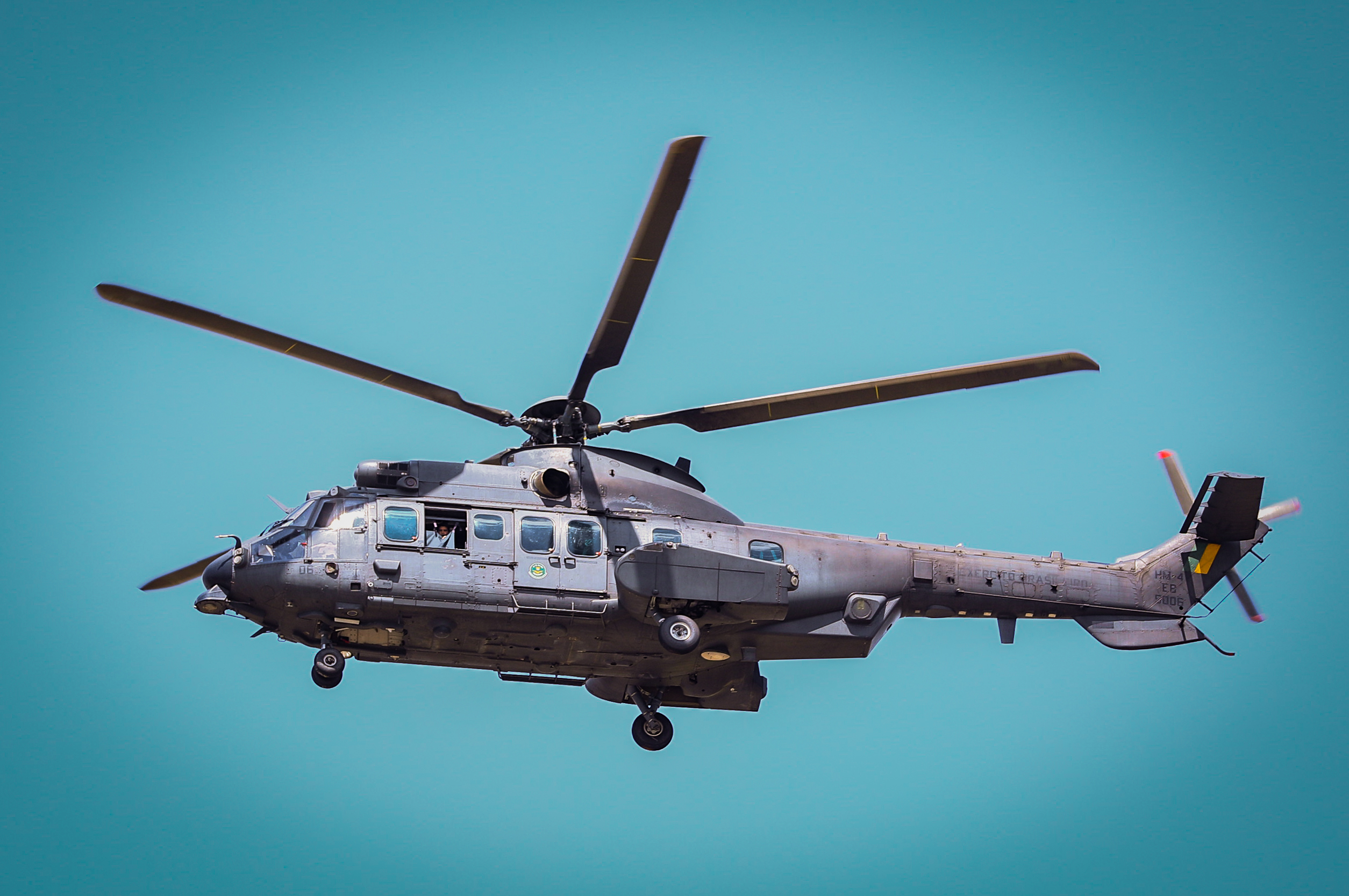
Brazilian Army EC725

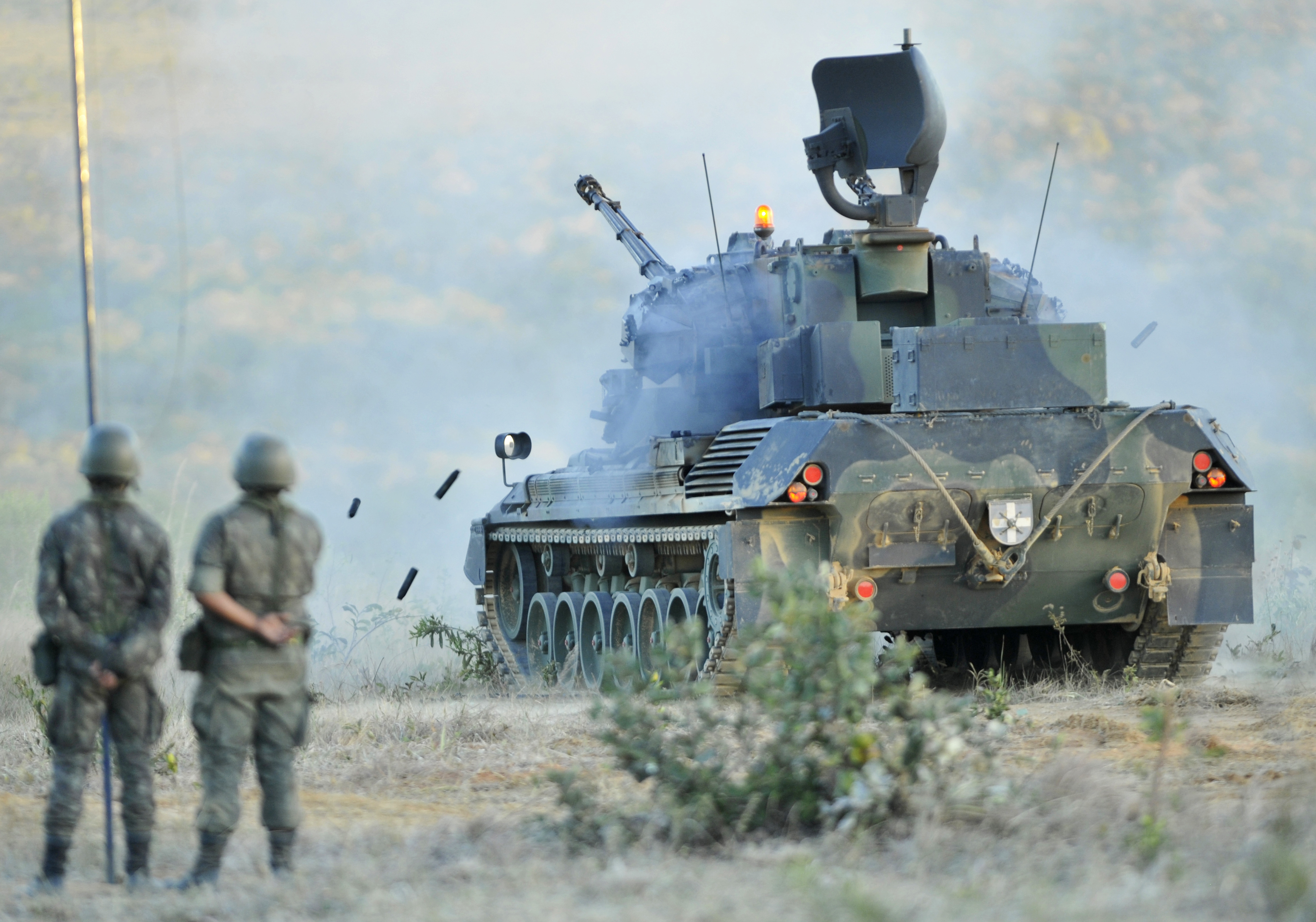
Brazilian Flakpanzer Gepard

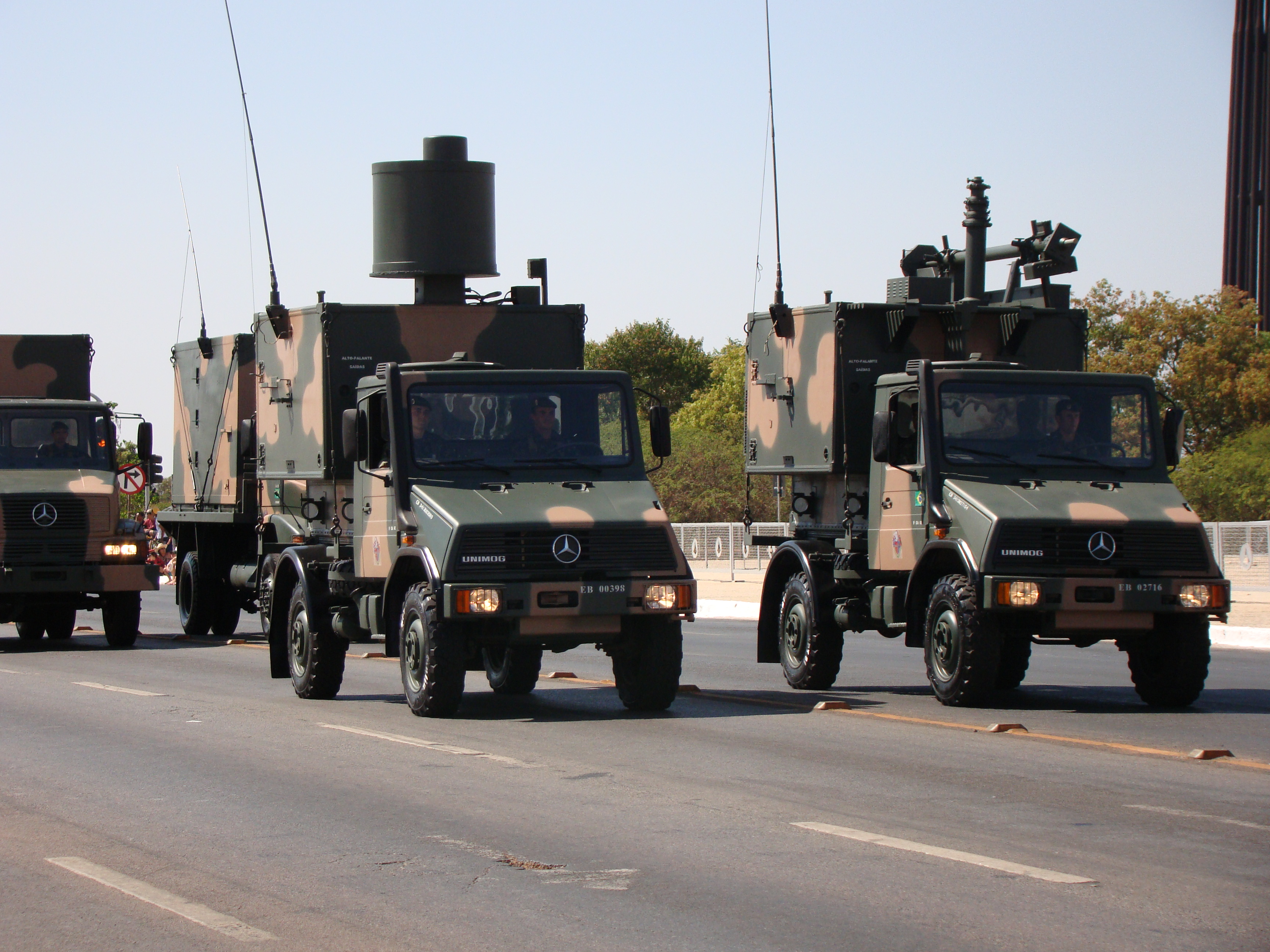
Electronic Warfare trucks

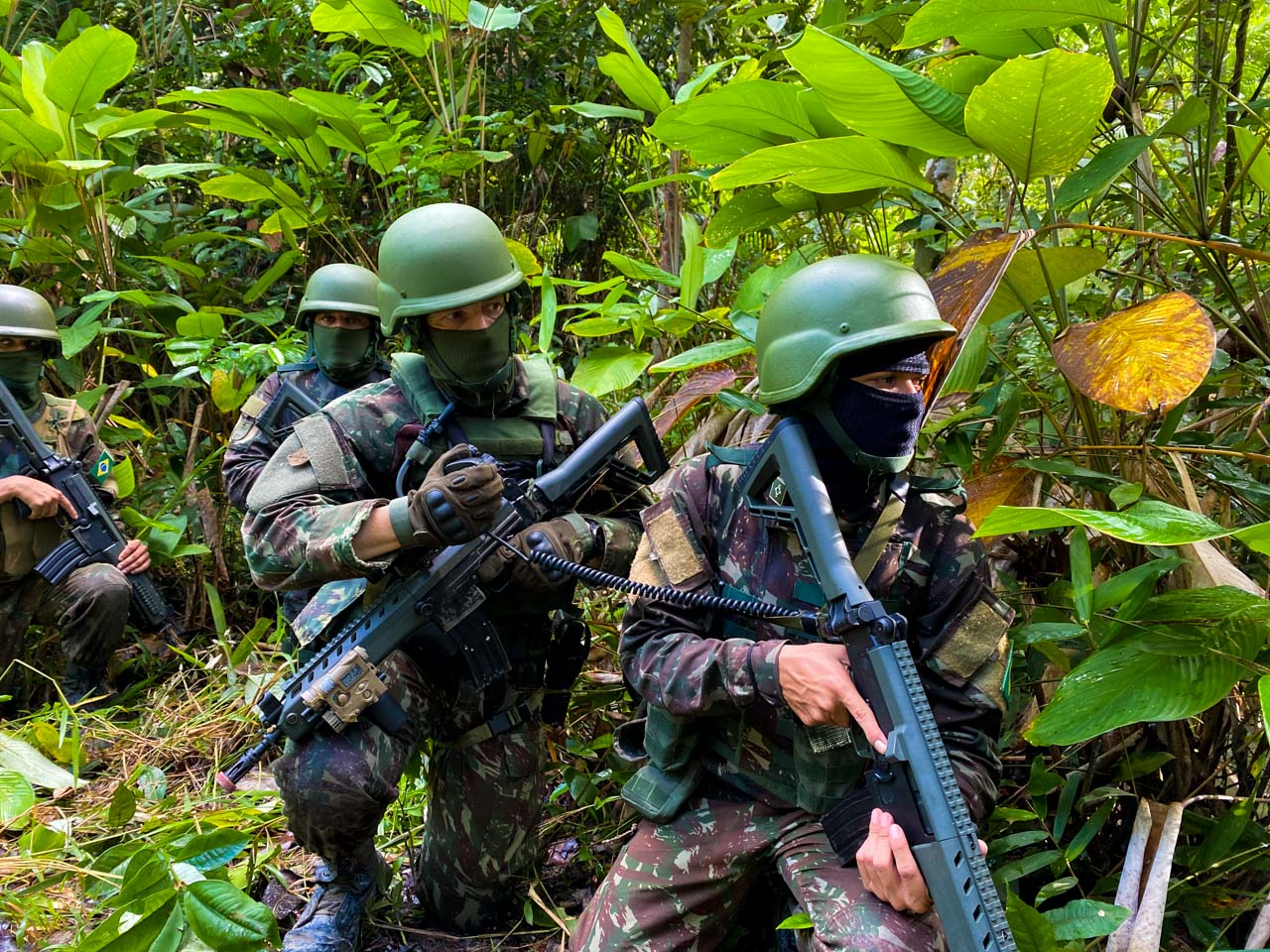
Jungle Warfare infantry

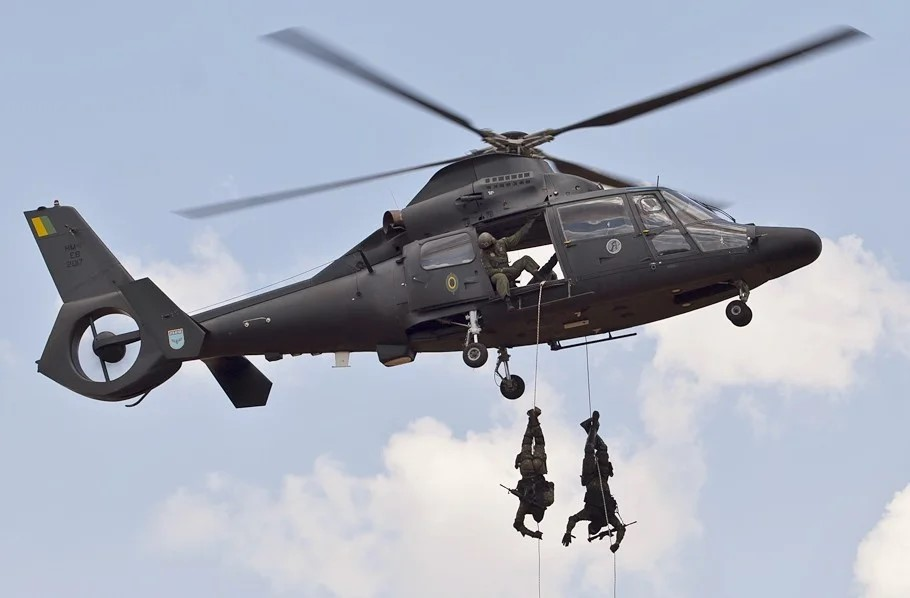
Airmobile infantry with a AS565 Panther of the Aviation Command

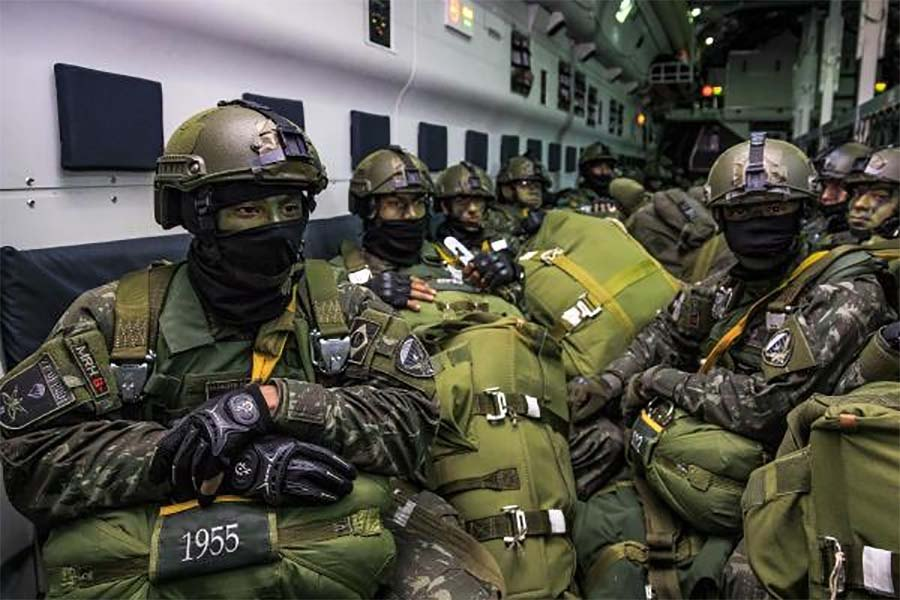
Brazilian Army Paratroopers

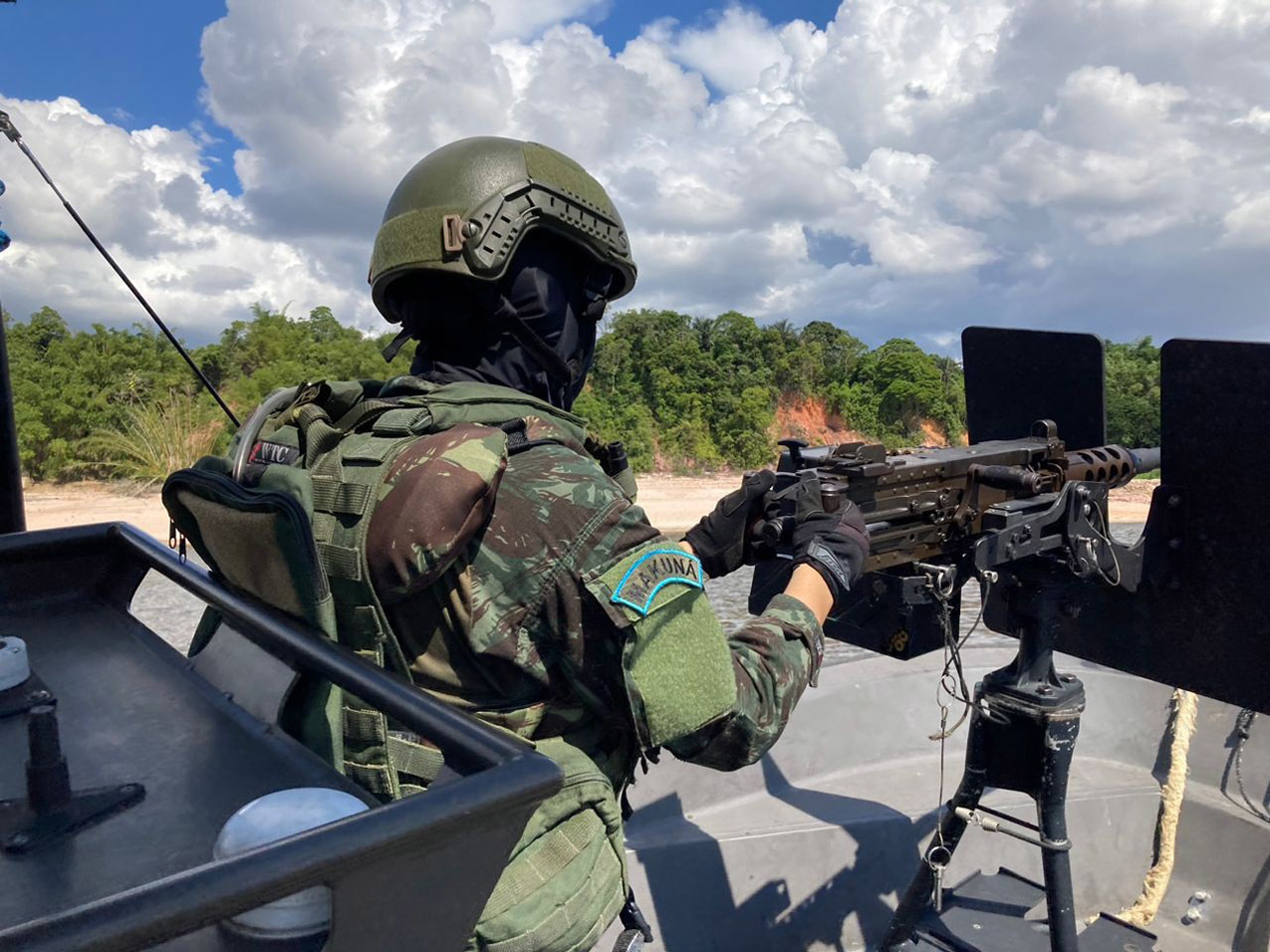
Border Battalion Soldier

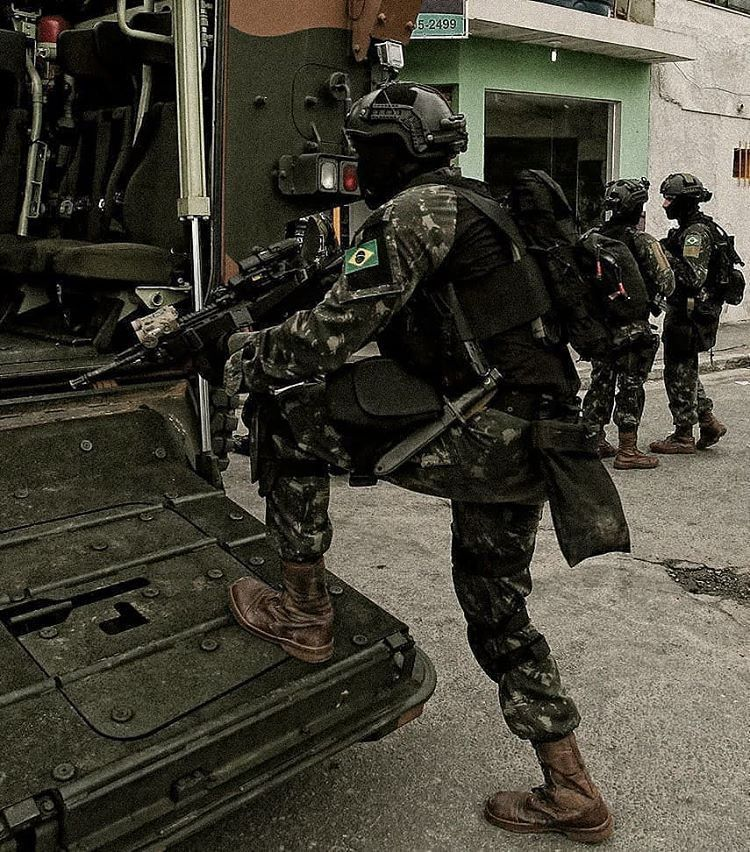
Army Special Forces

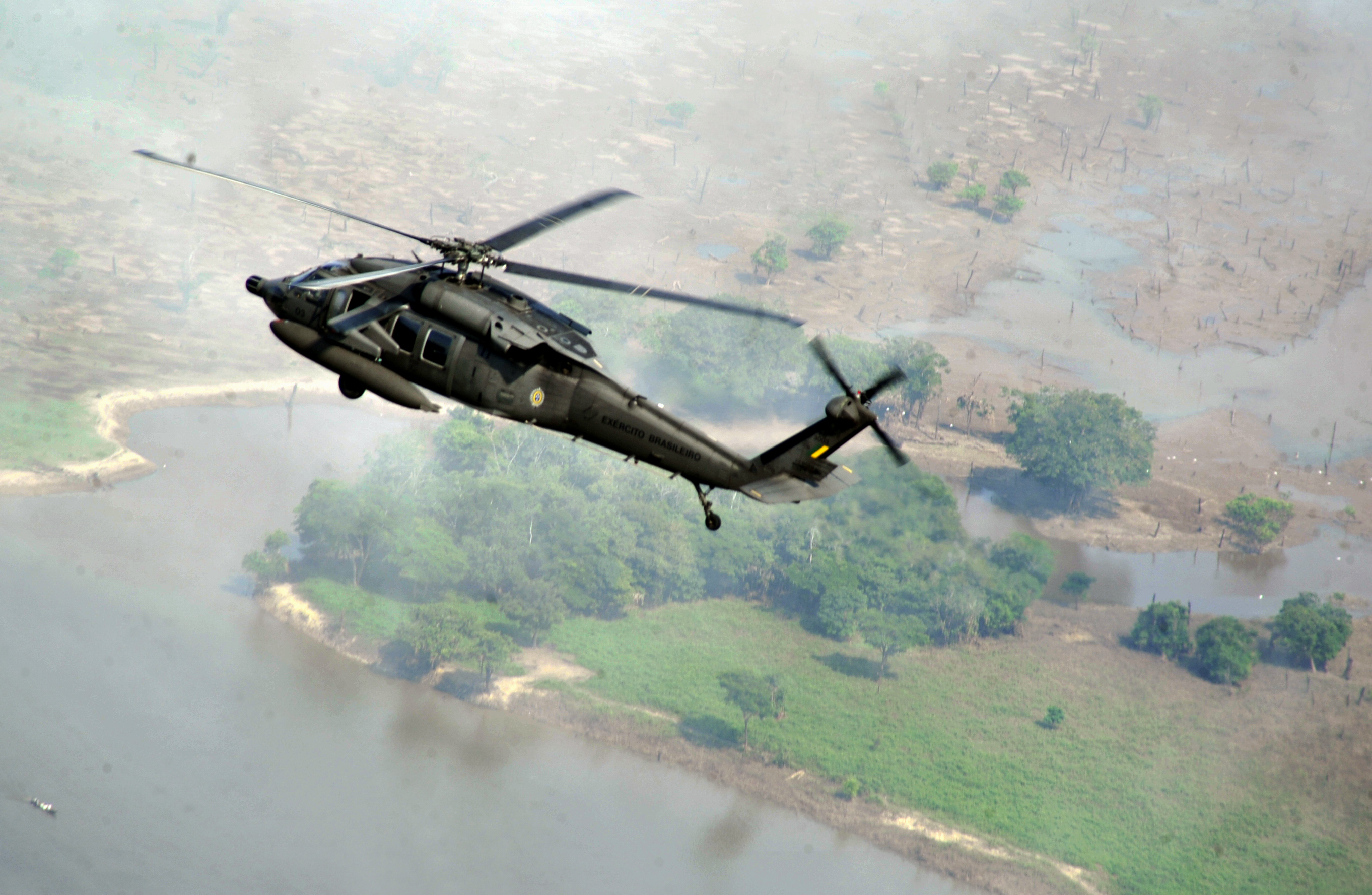
Brazilian UH-60 Black Hawk in the Amazon region

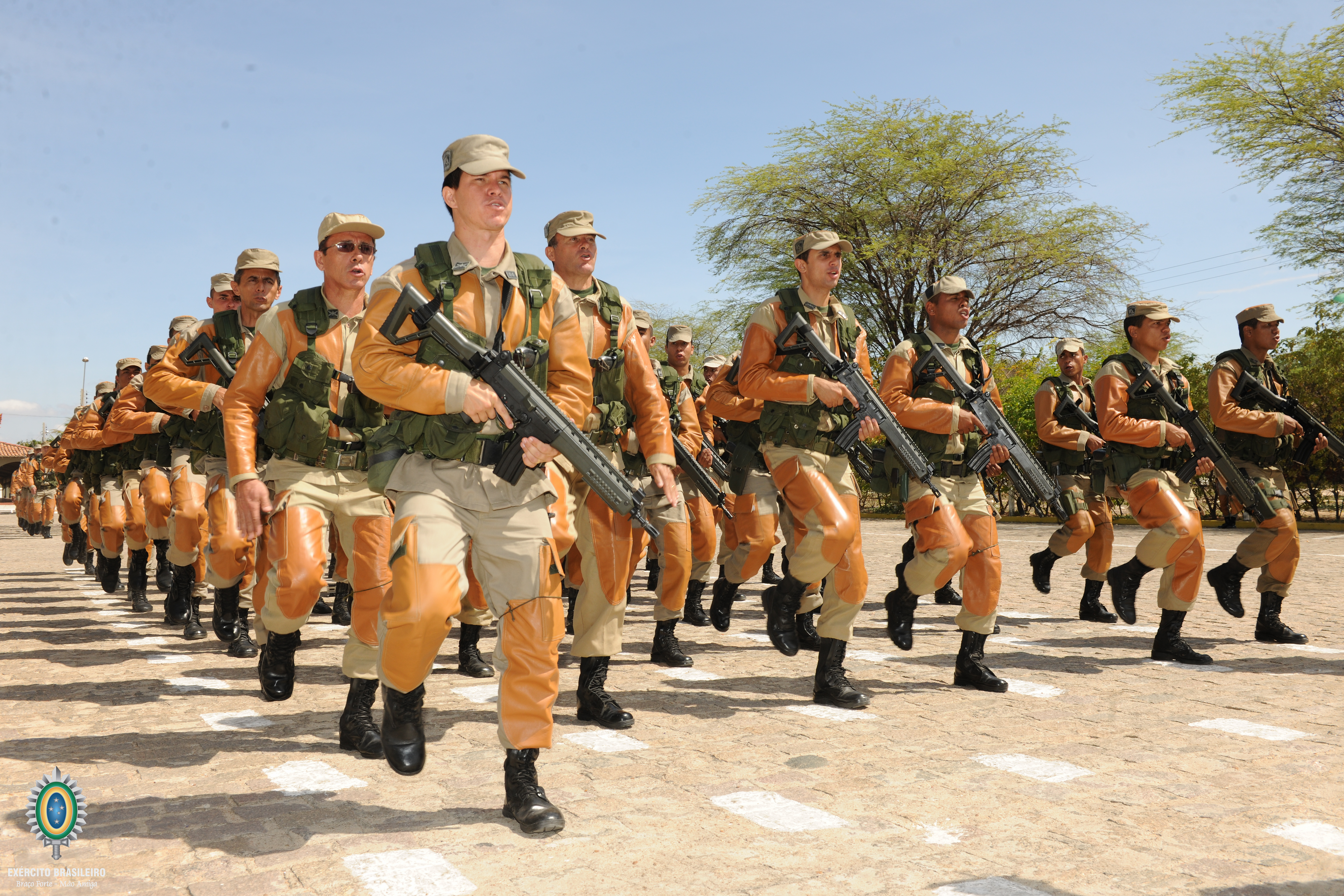
Brazilian Caatinga soldiers

== Brazilian Navy ==
The navy (Portuguese: Marinha do Brasil) has eight bases throughout Brazil.

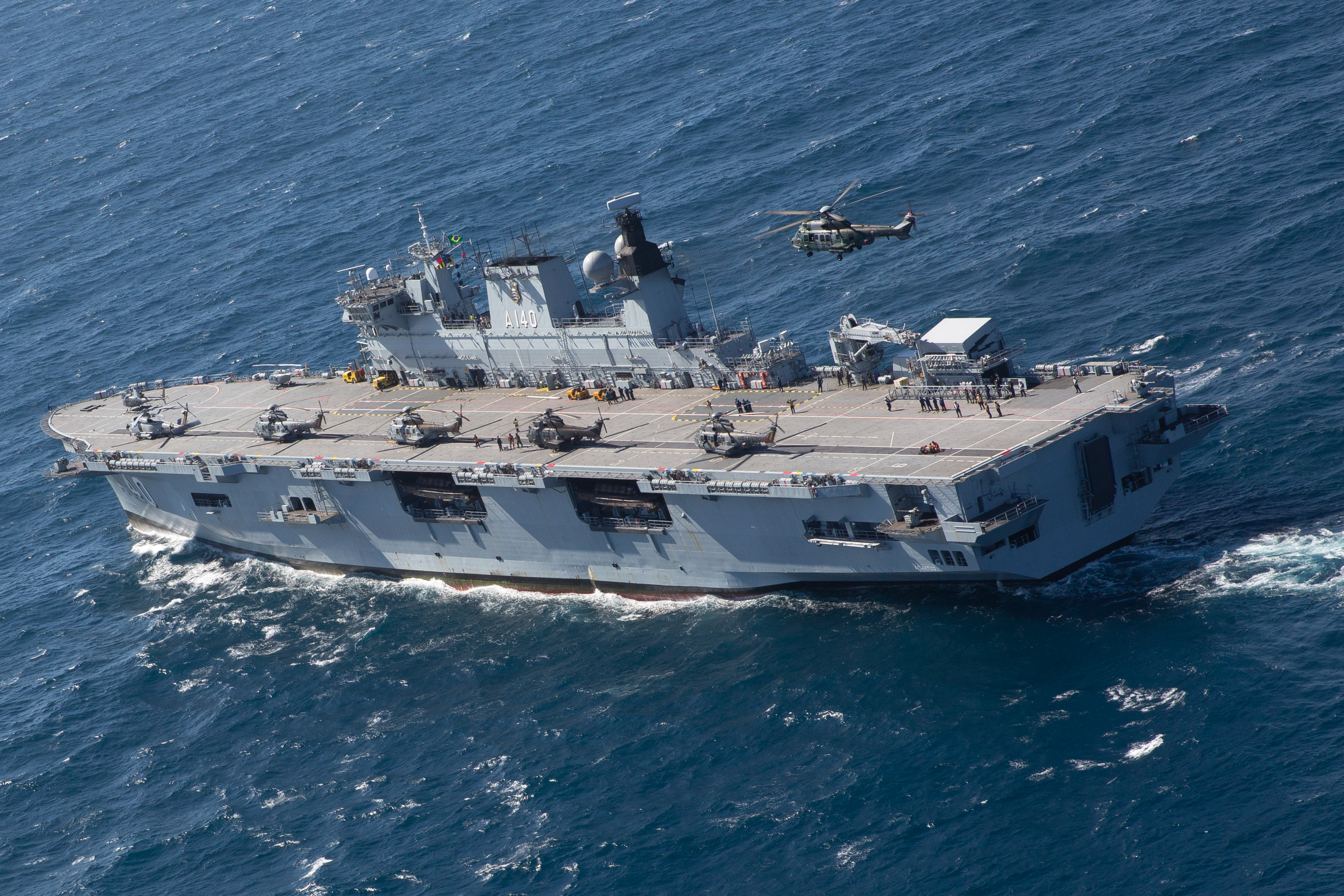
Helicopter carrier Atlântico

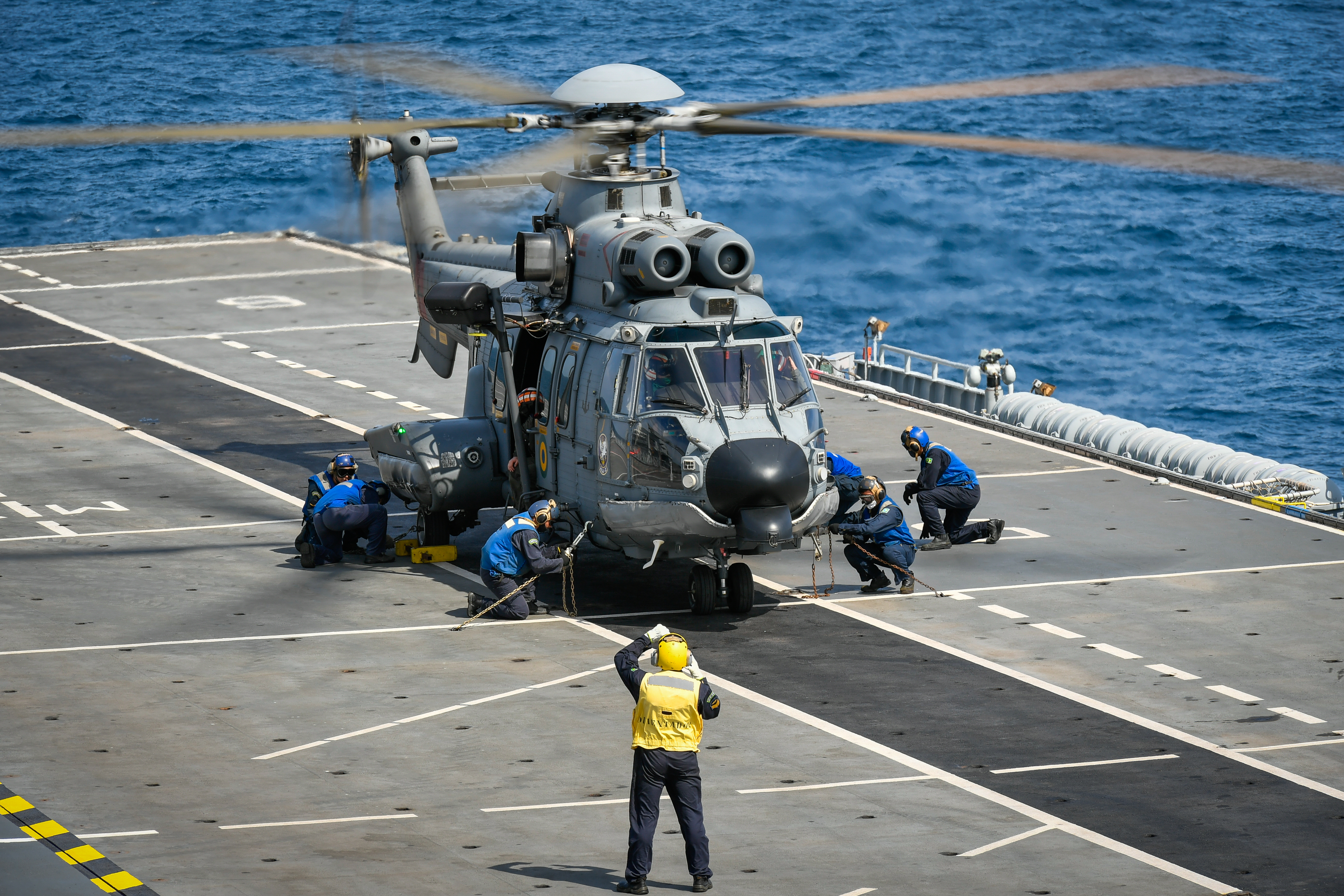
EC725 helicopter aboard Atlântico

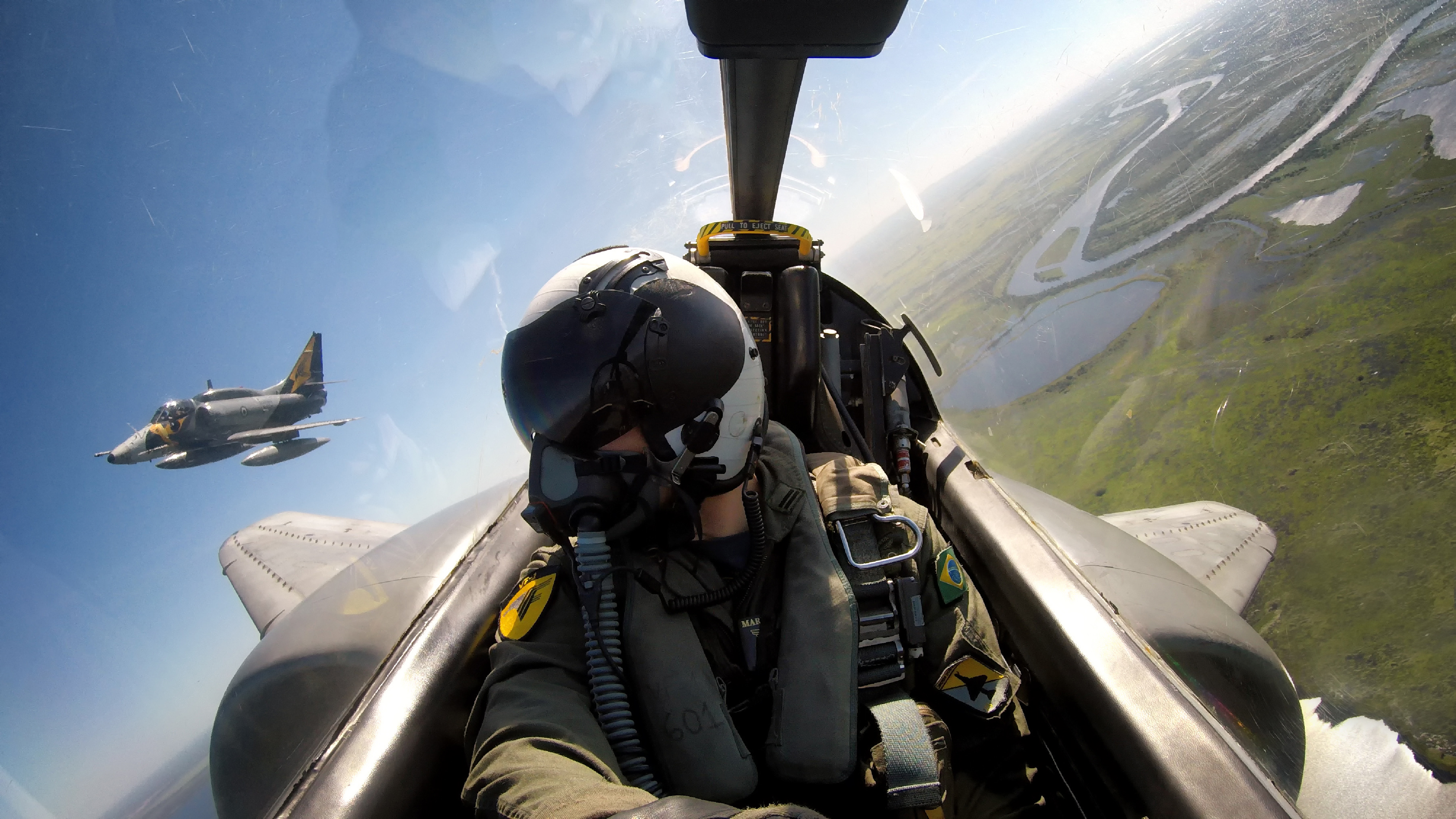
Brazilian Navy A-4 Skyhawk

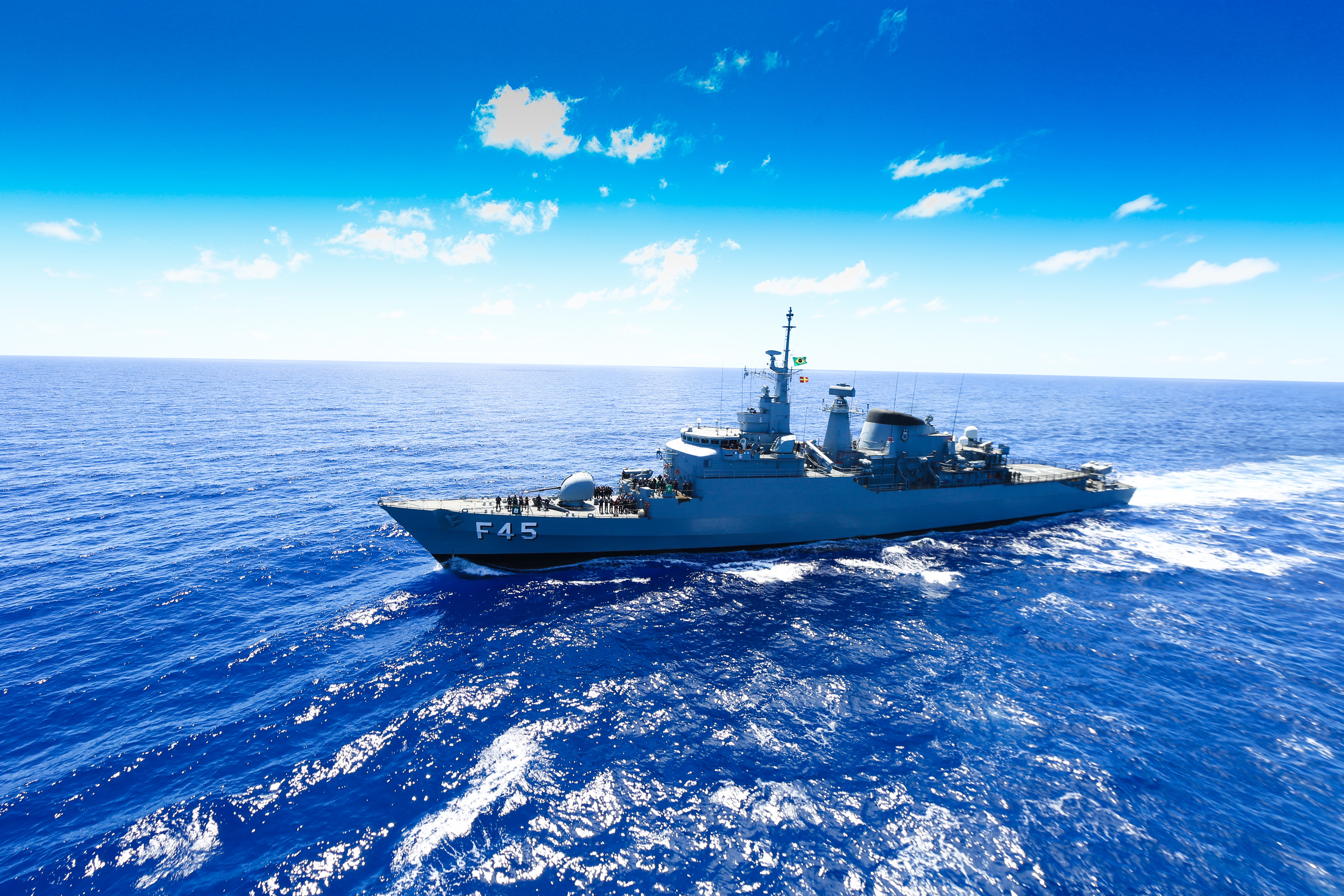
Frigate Constituição underway

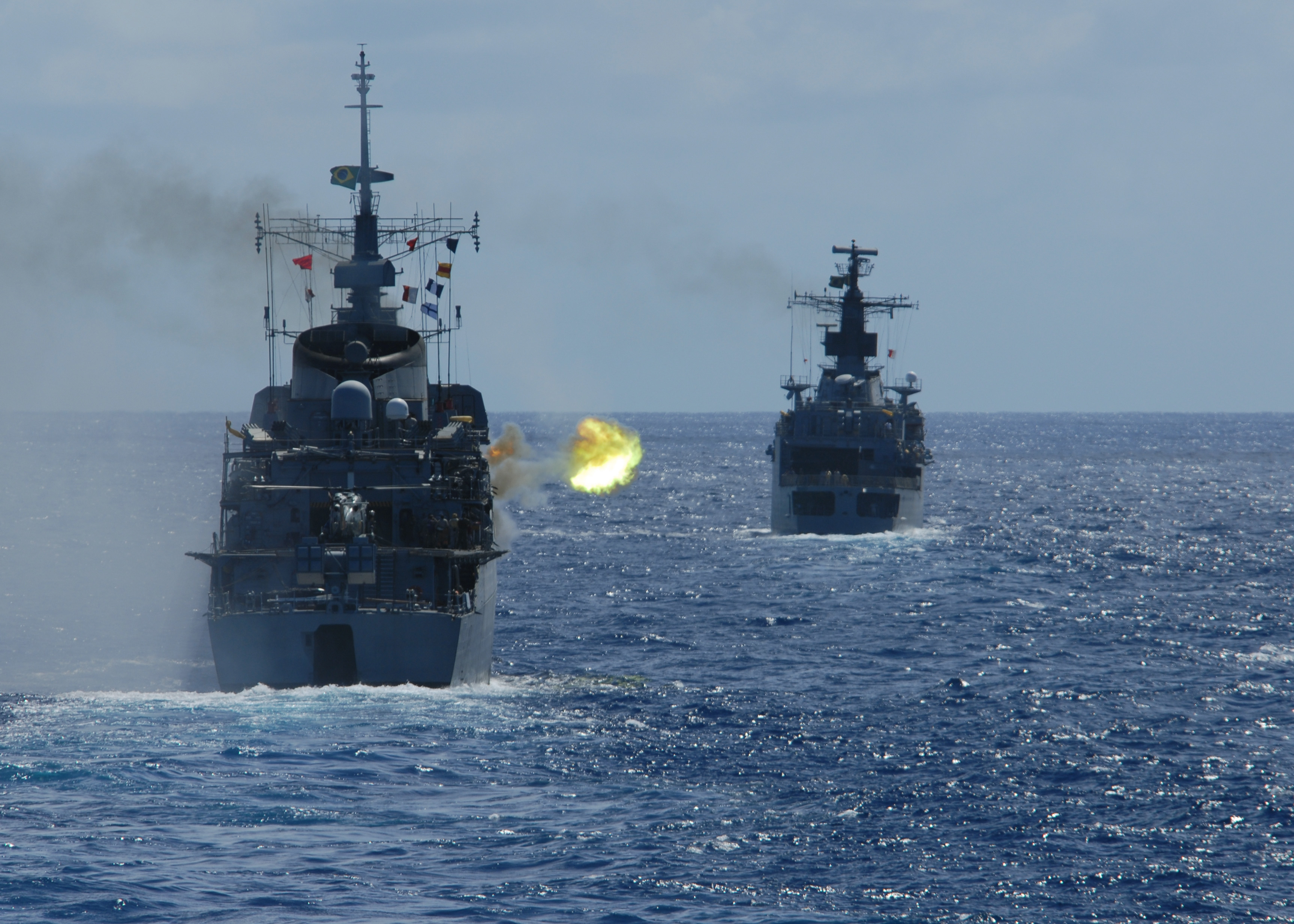
Brazilian frigates in shooting exercise

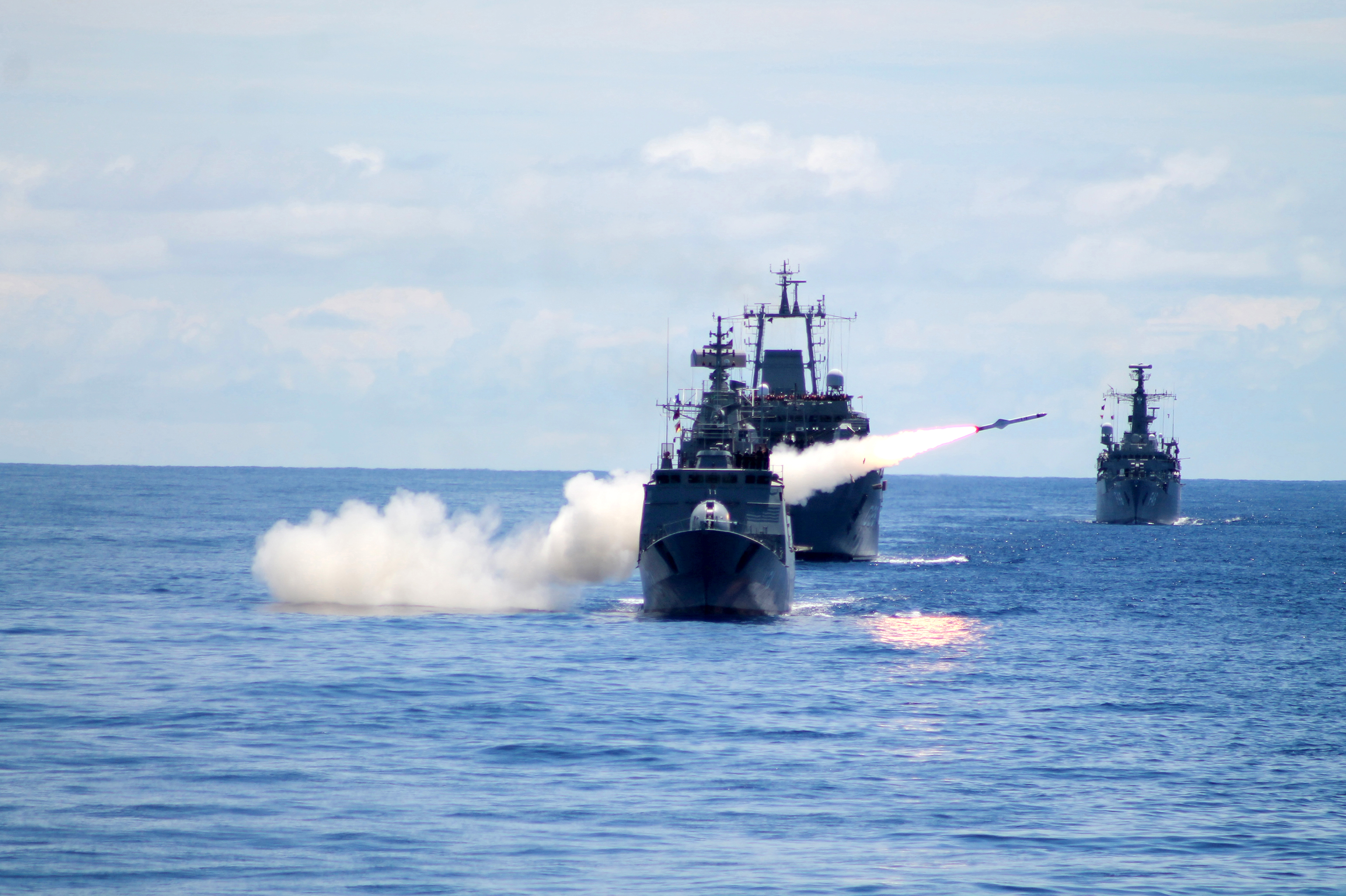
Corvette Barroso firing missile Exocet

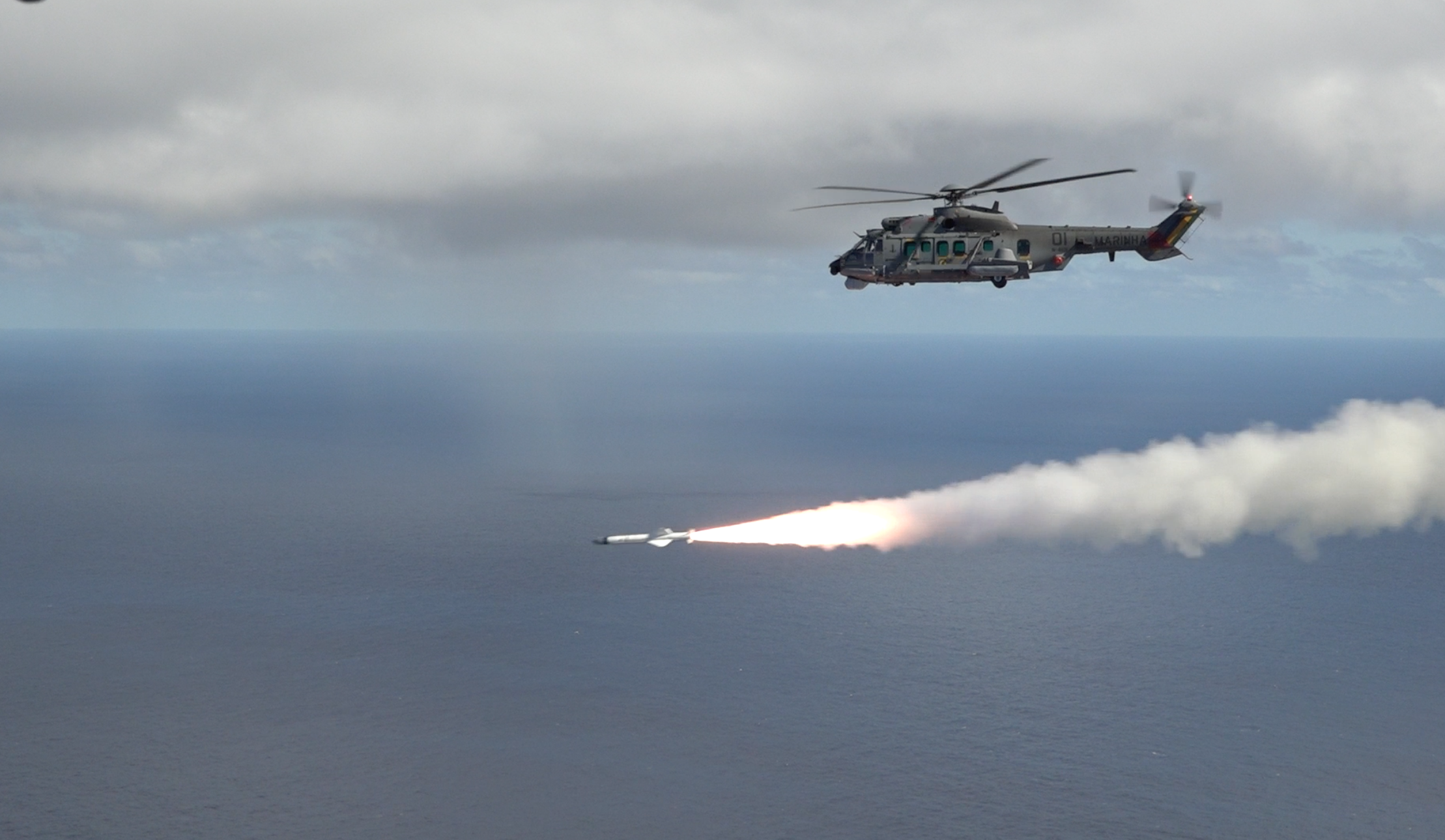
EC725 firing an Exocet missile

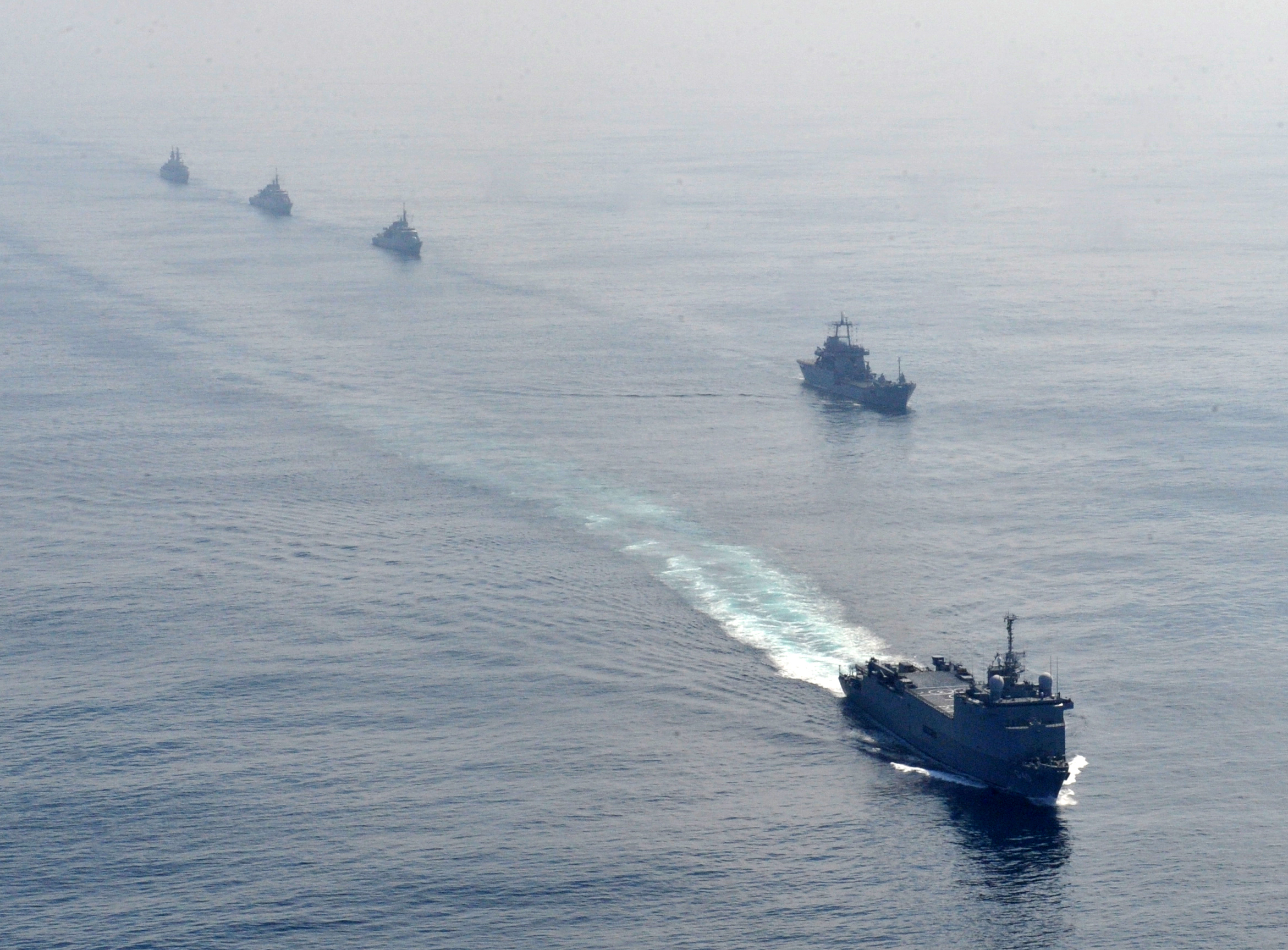
Task Force with Bahia leading

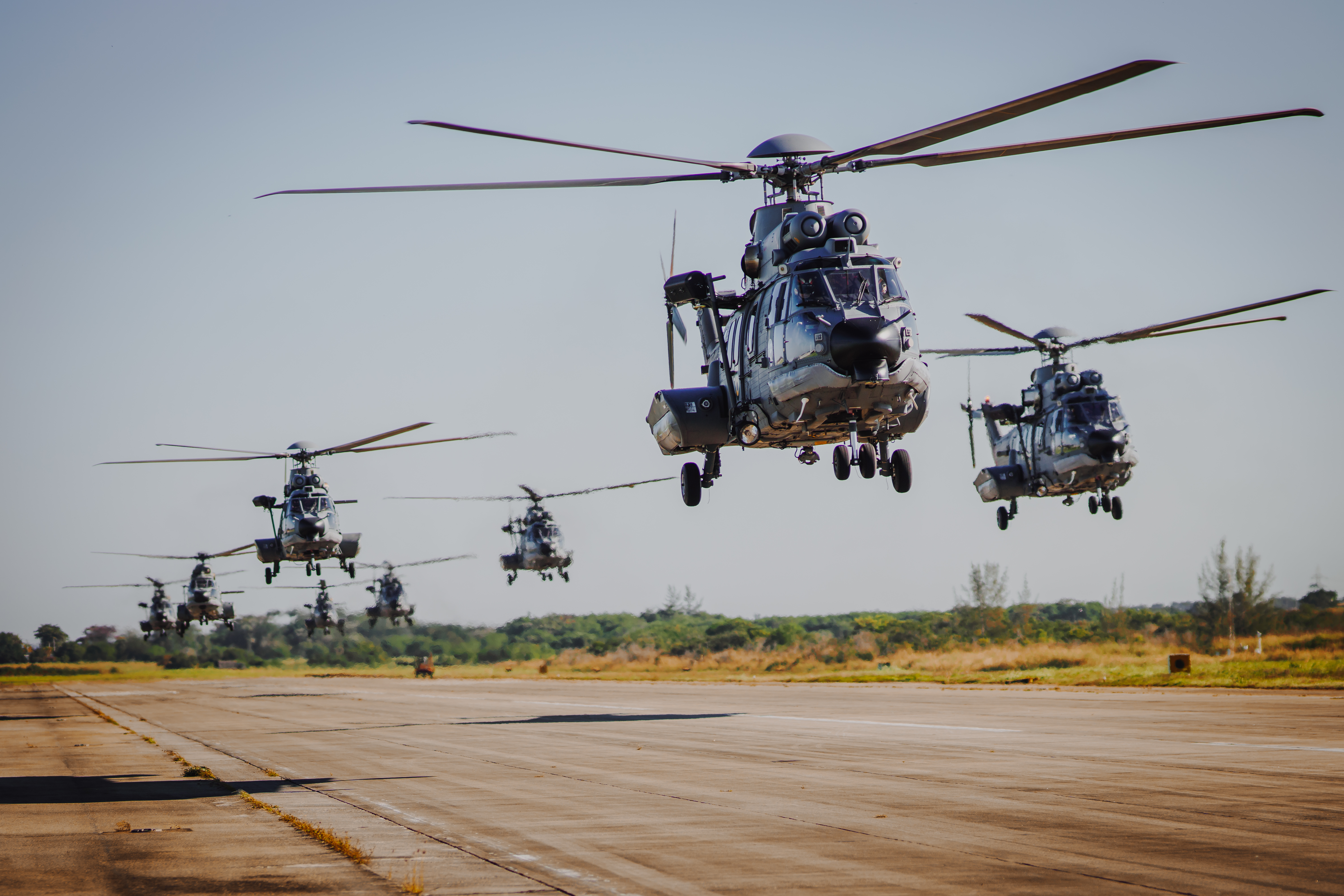
Brazilian Navy squadron of EC725s in flight

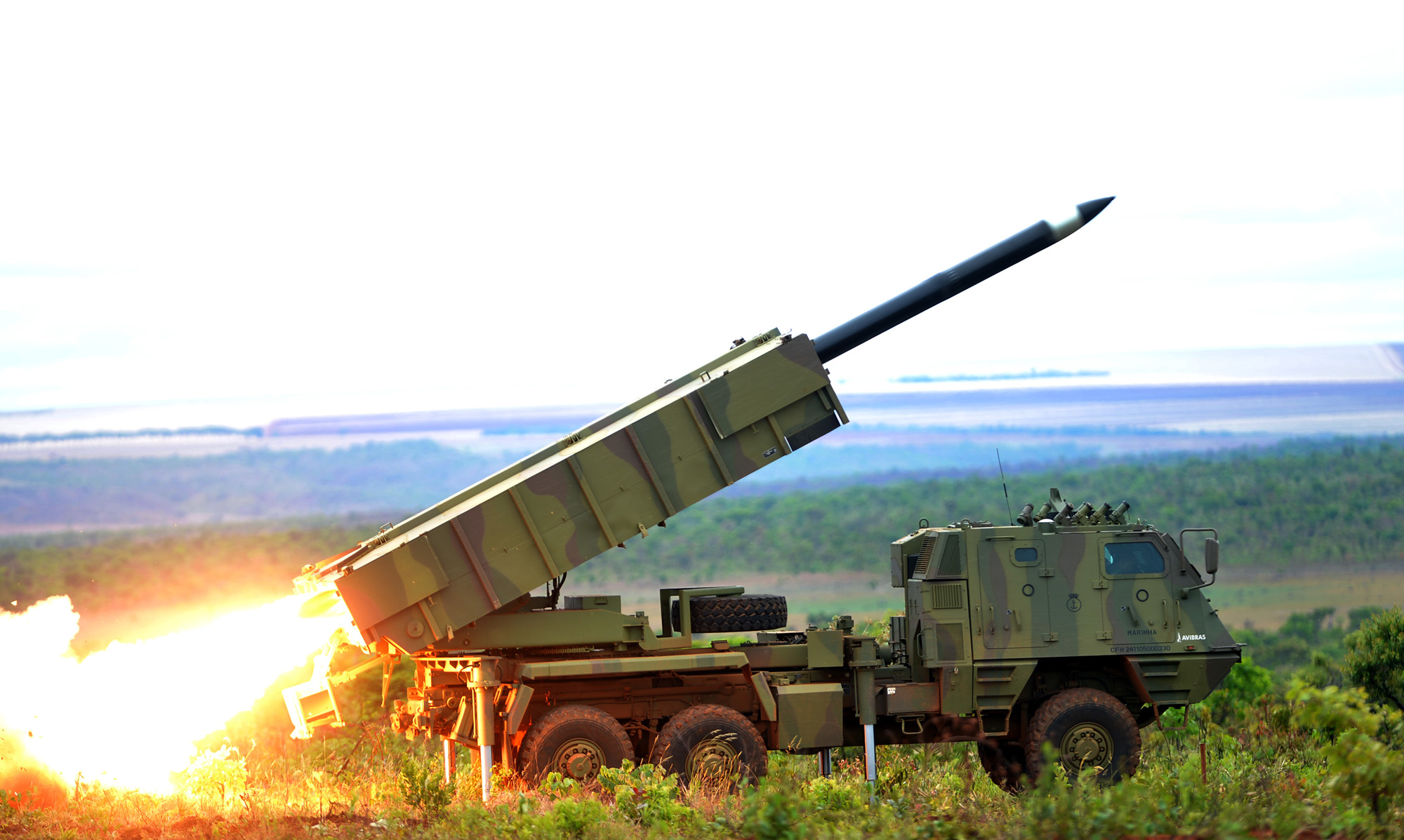
Brazilian Marines ASTROS system

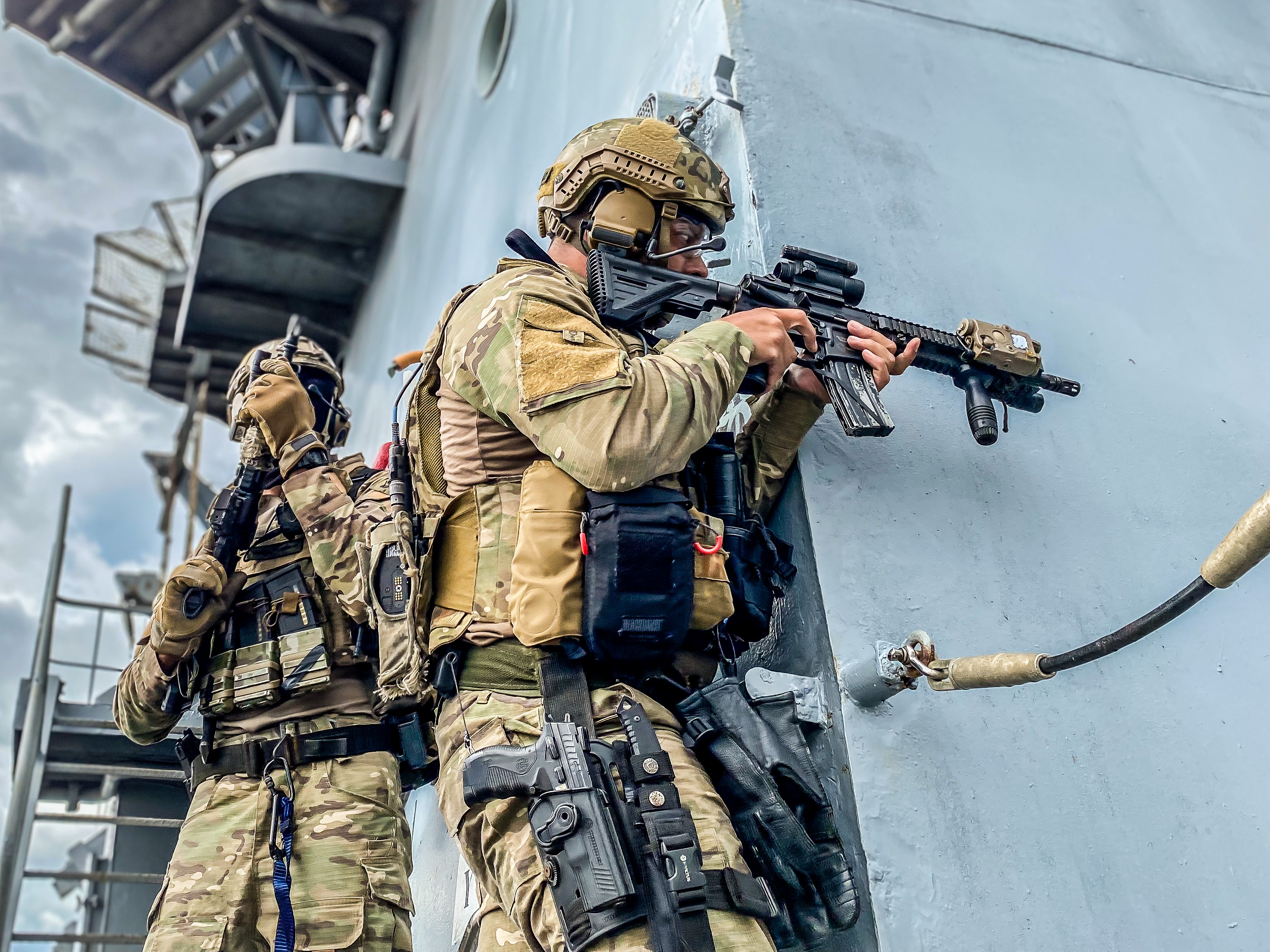
Brazilian Navy SOF (GRUMEC)

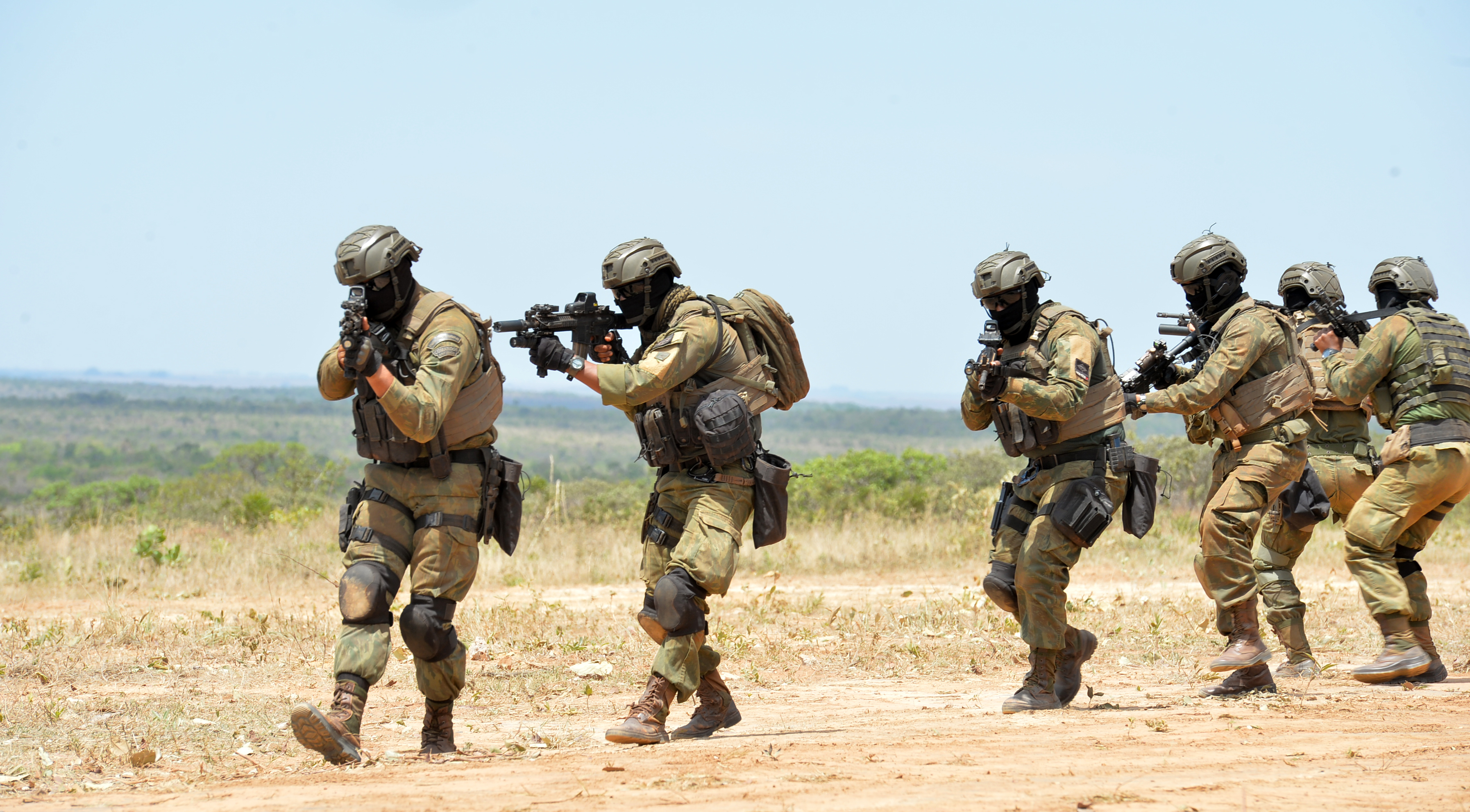
Brazilian Marines SOF (COMANF)

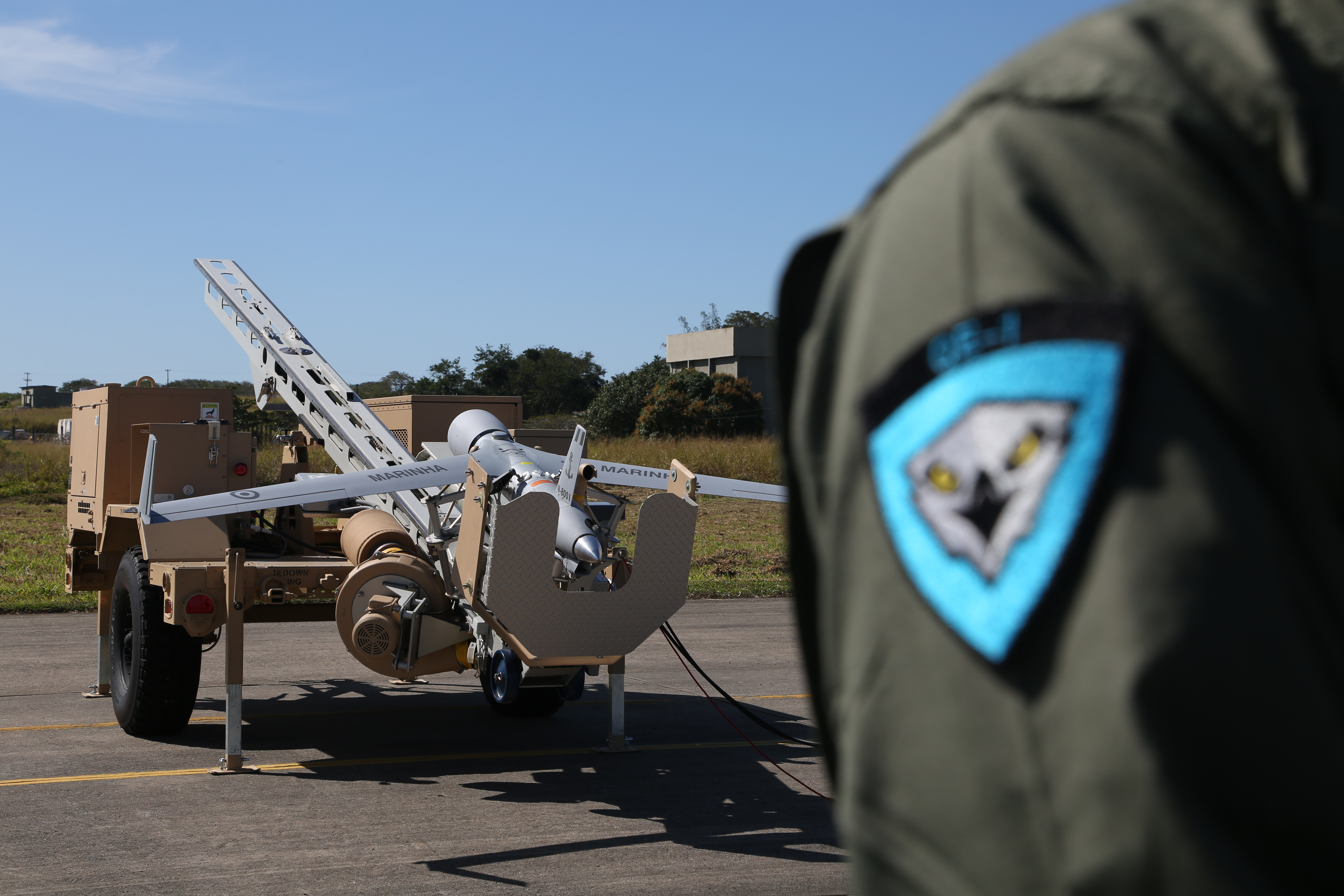
Brazilian ScanEagle UAV

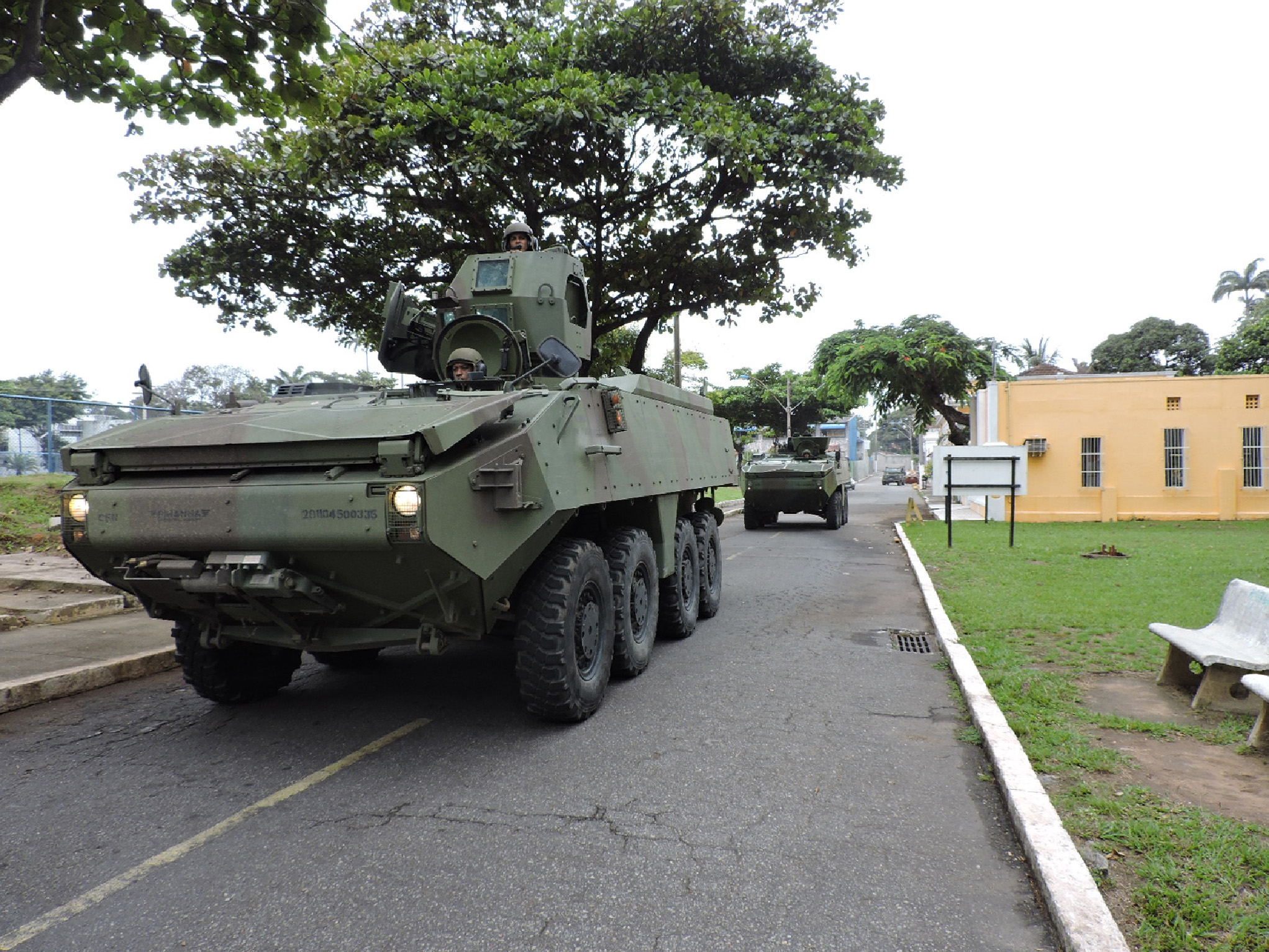
Brazilian Marines MOWAG Piranha

== Brazilian Air Force ==
The Brazilian Air Force (Portuguese: Força Aérea Brasileira, [ˌfoʁsaˈɛɾjɐ bɾaziˈlejɾɐ], also known as FAB, [ˈfabi] or [ˌɛfiaˈbe]) is the second-largest air force in the Americas (behind only the United States) and has around 70,000 active personnel. The FAB is subdivided into four operational commands.

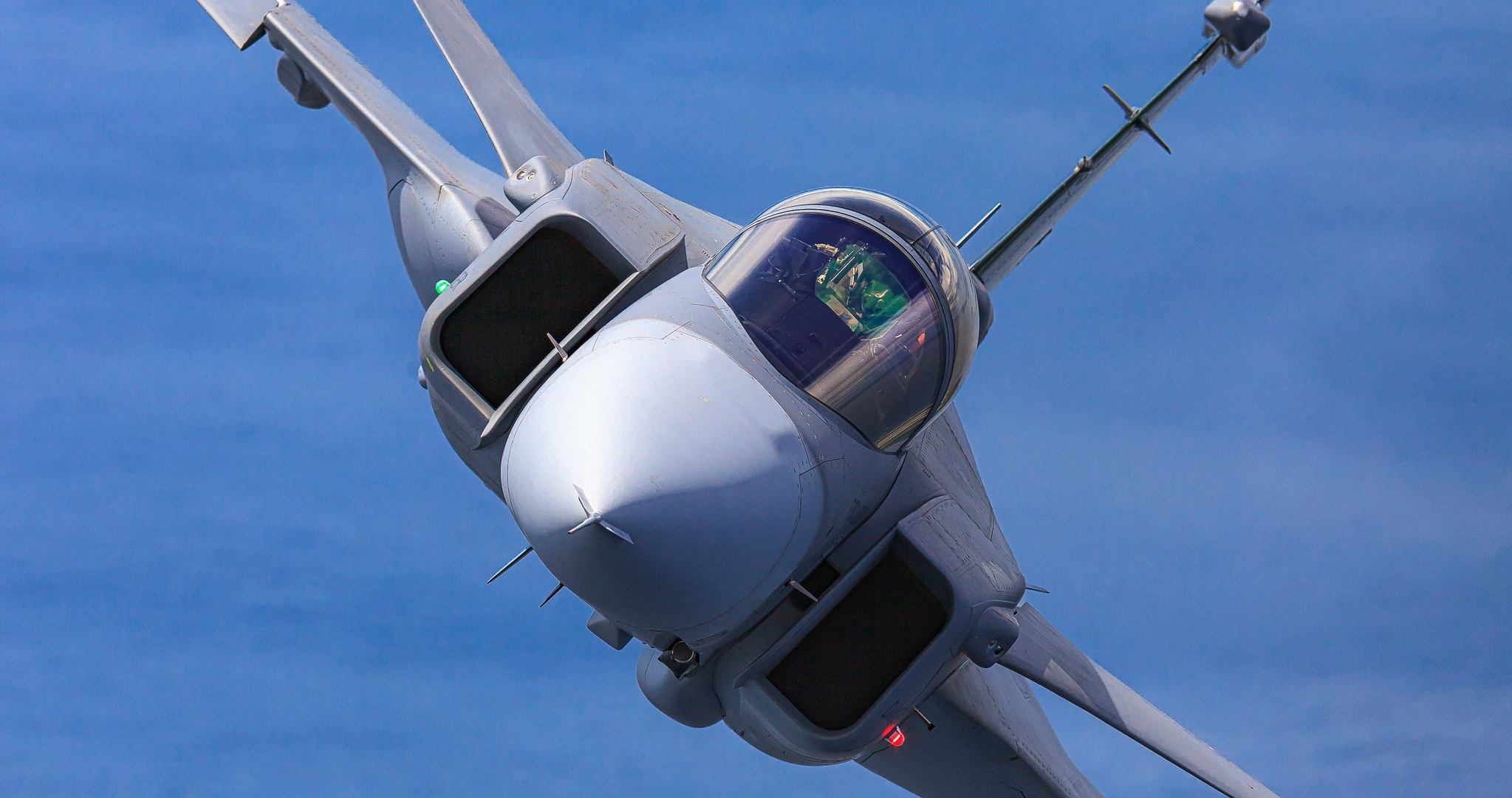
F-39E Gripen during an exercise

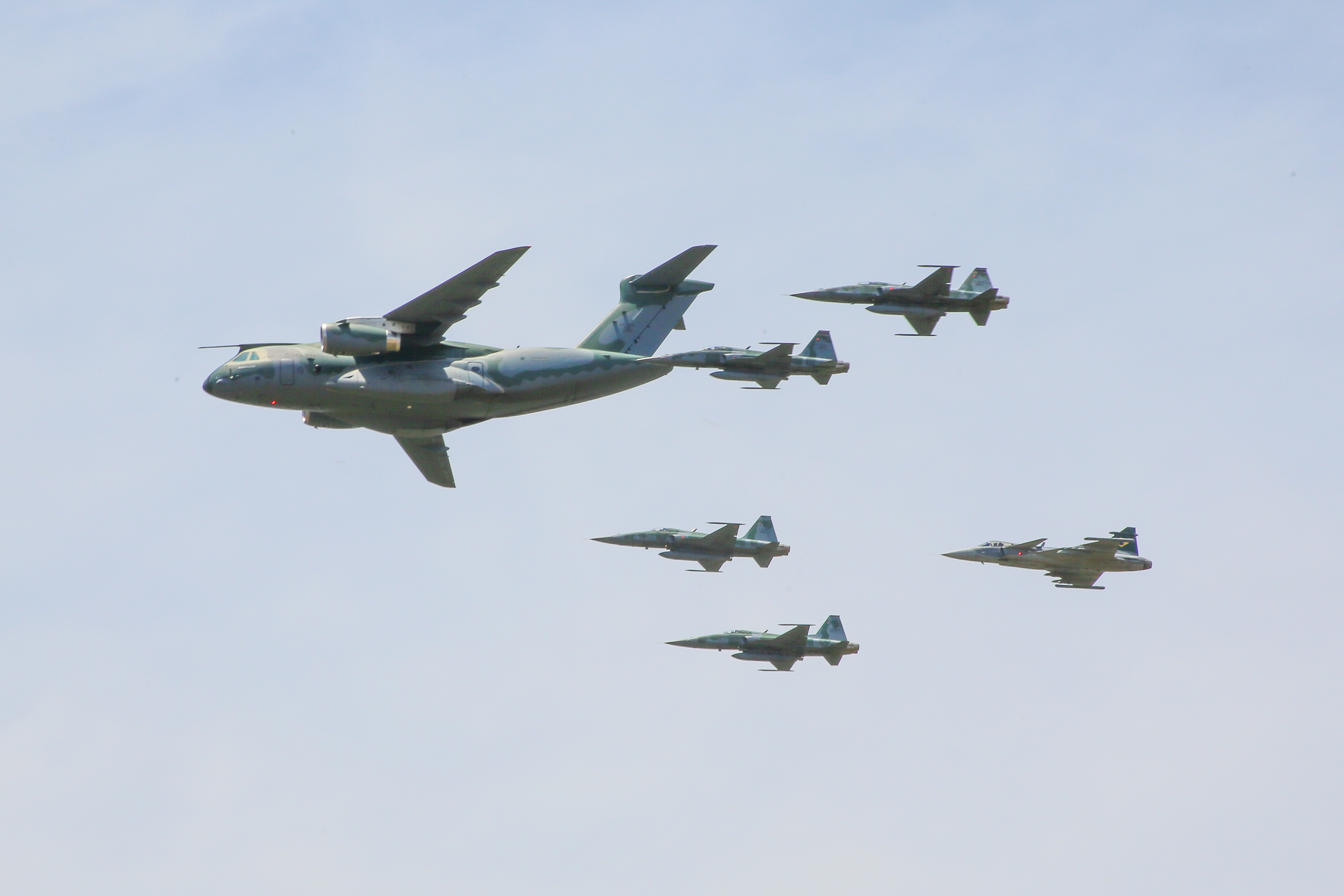
KC-390 in formation with F-5M and F-39E

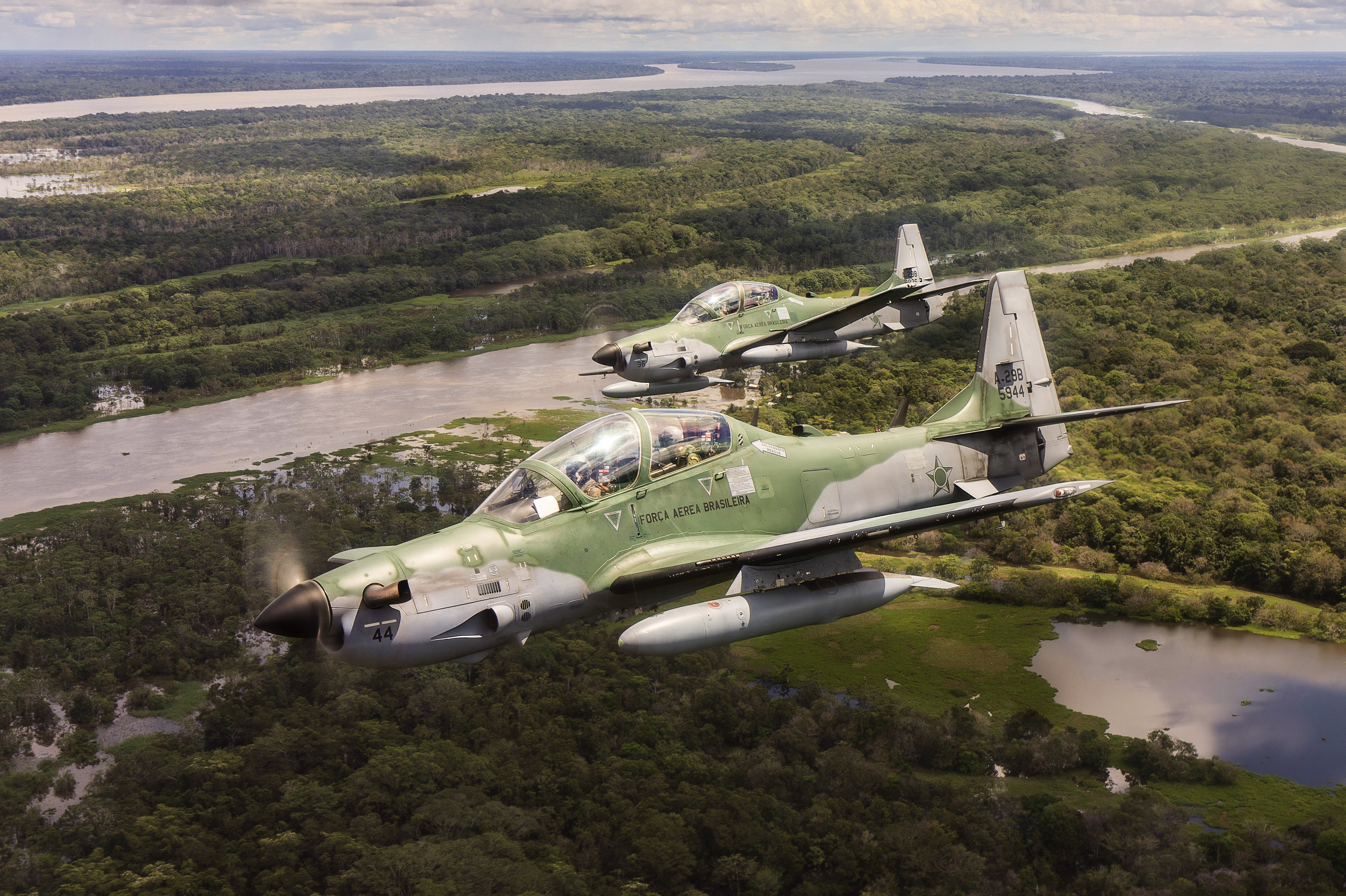
A-29 Super Tucano patrolling the Amazon rainforest

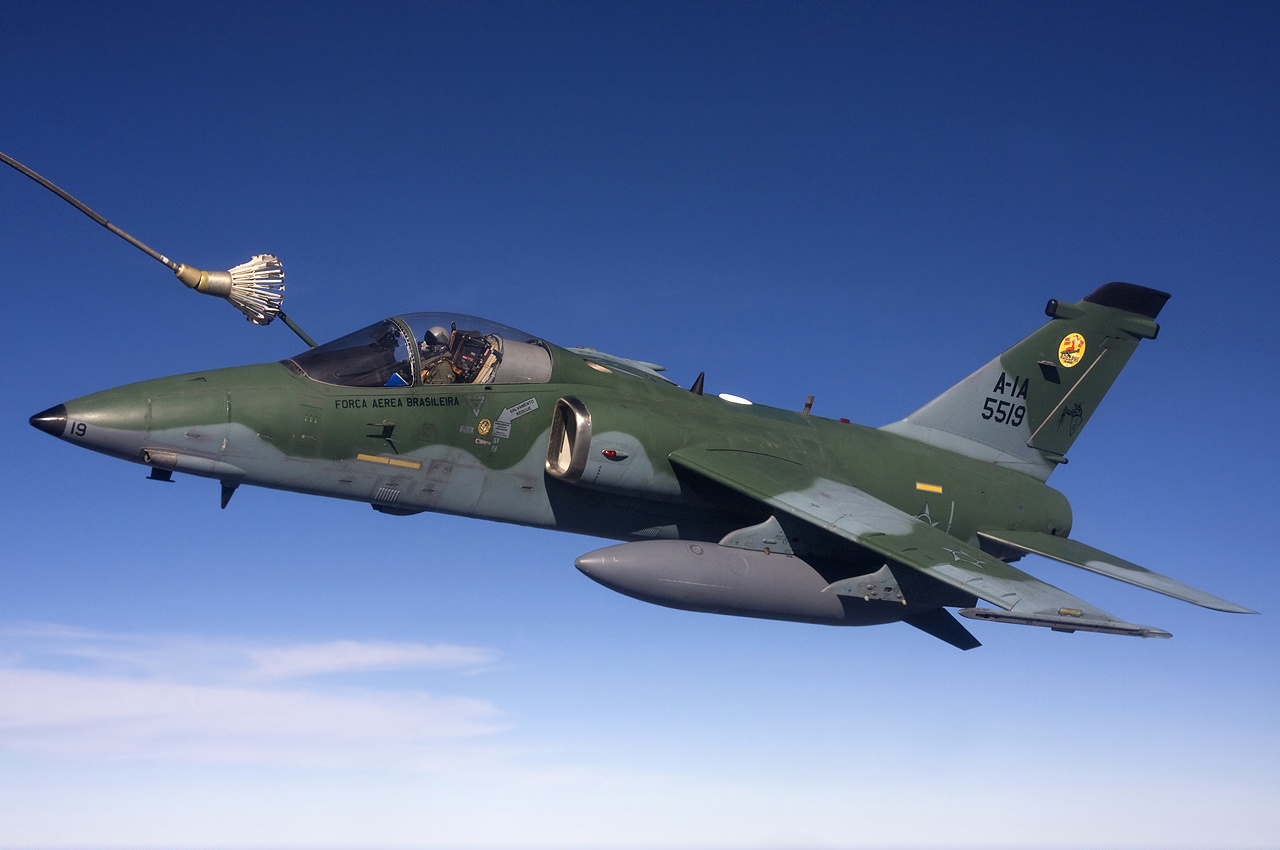
AMX attack aircraft

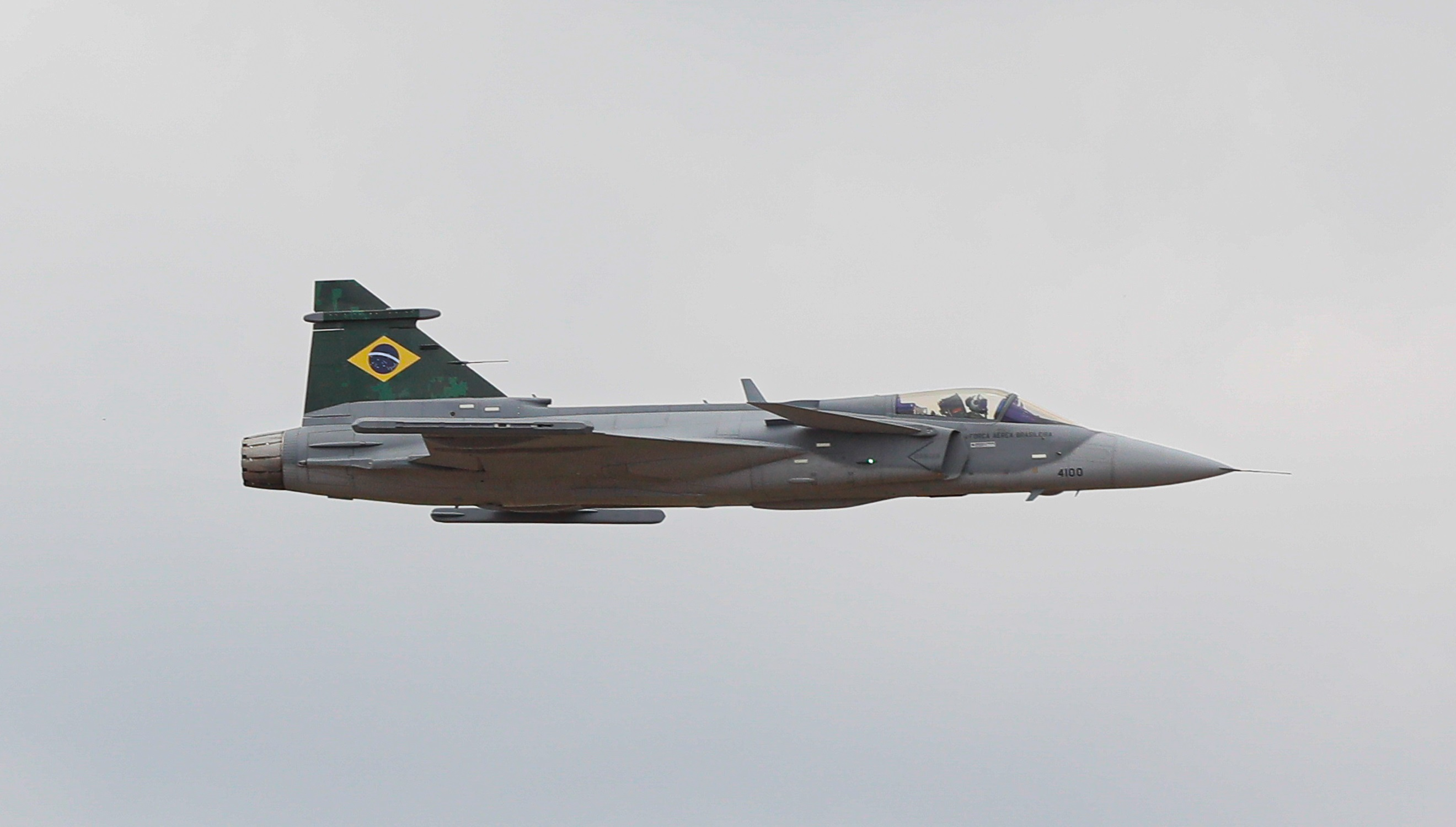
F-39E Gripen multirole fighter

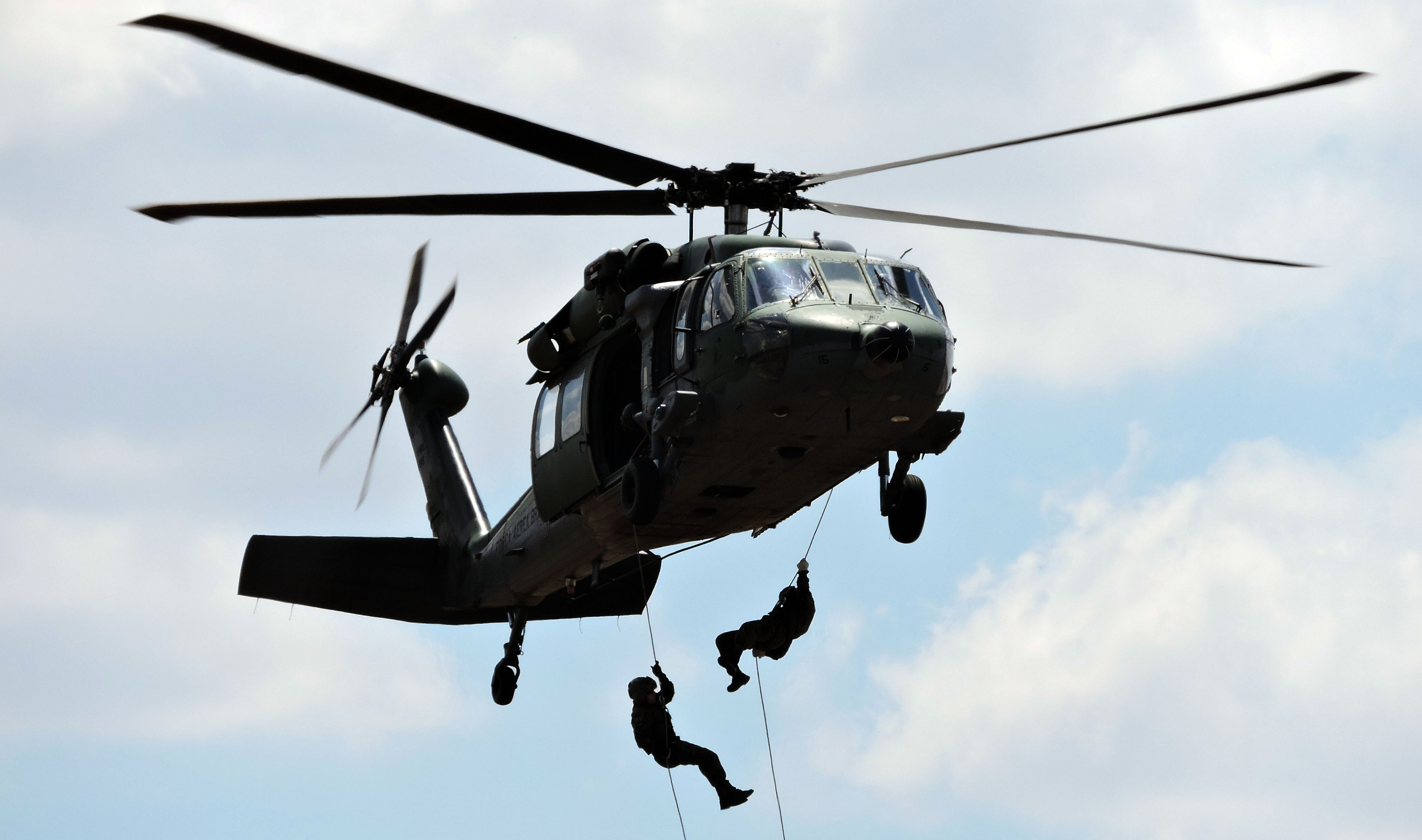
UH-60L helicopter

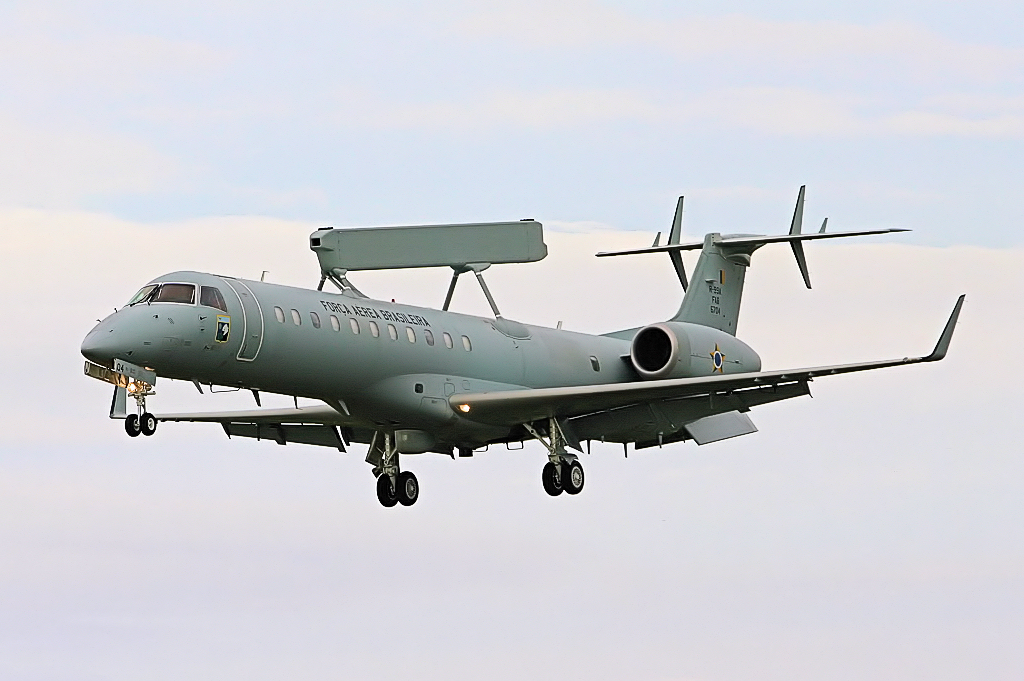
Brazilian Air Force E-99 AEW&C

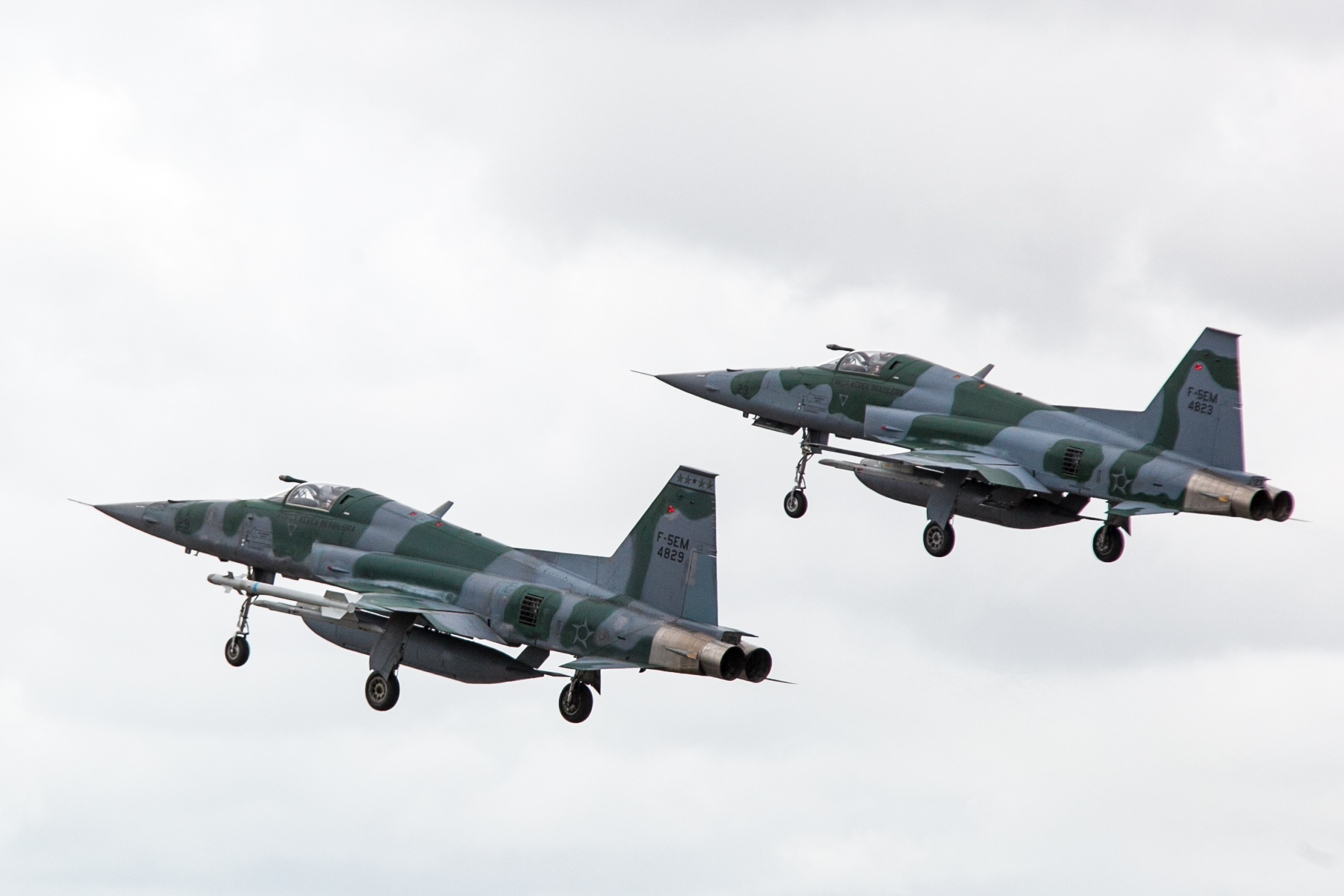
Two F-5M taking off in aerial alert

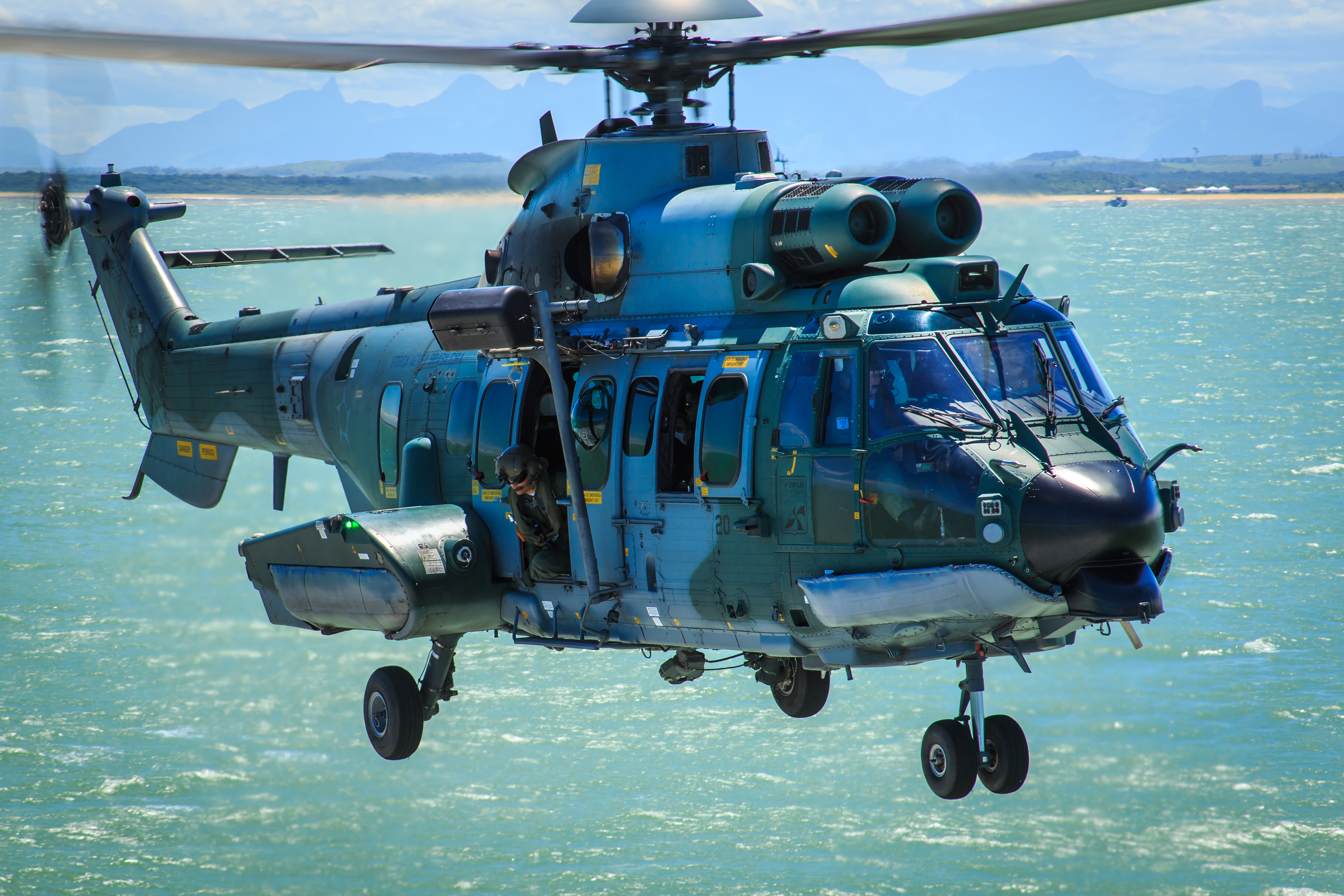
Brazilian Air Force EC725

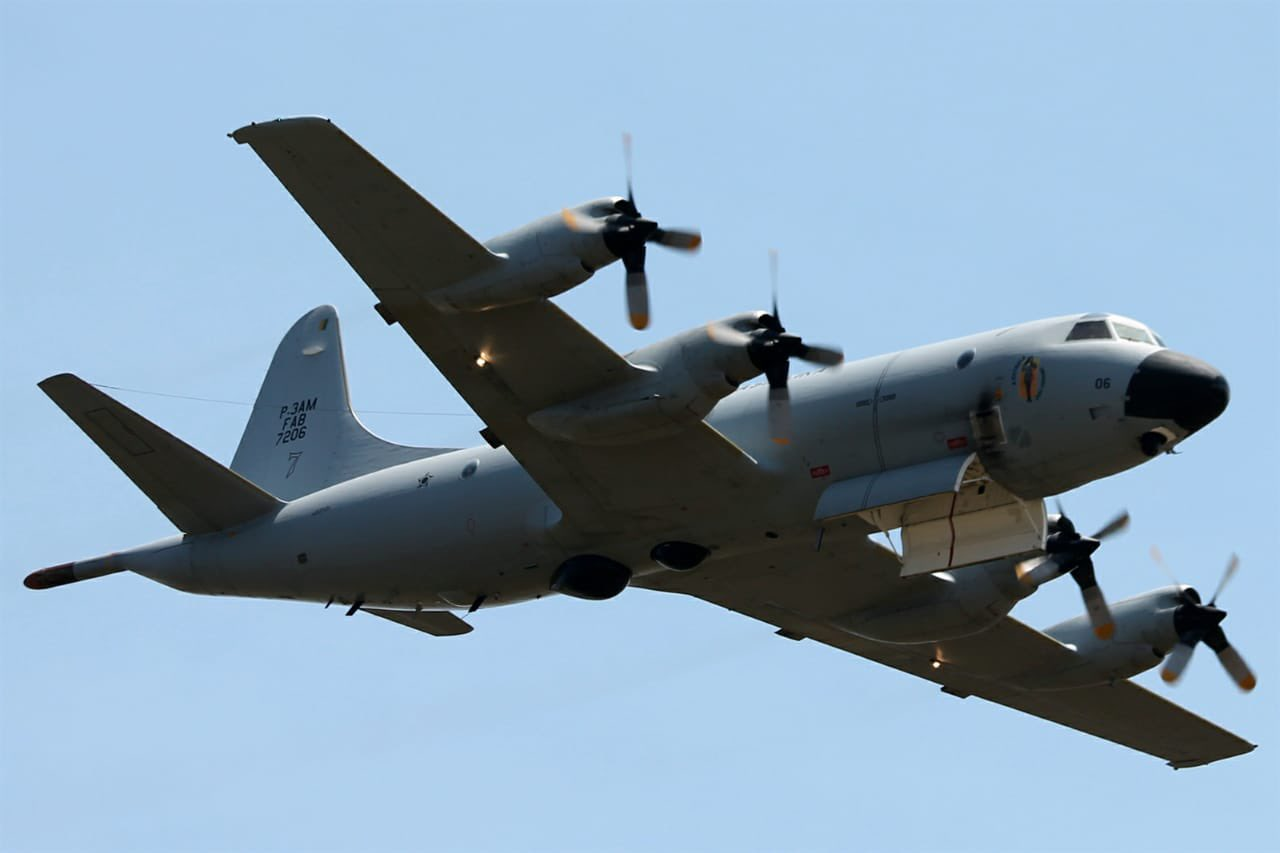
P-3AM Orion patrol aircraft

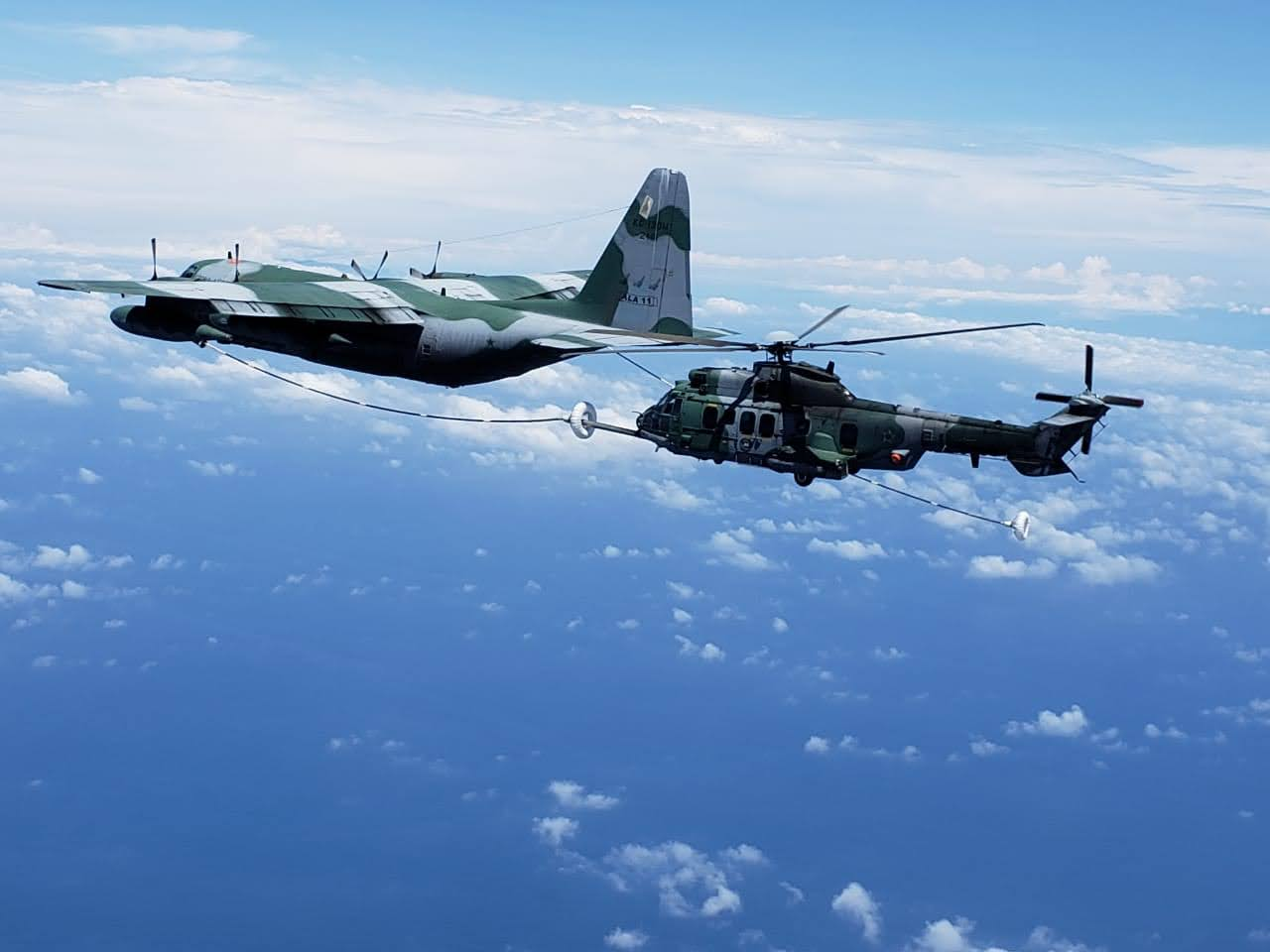
Air Force KC-130 refuels H-36 Caracal over Rio de Janeiro

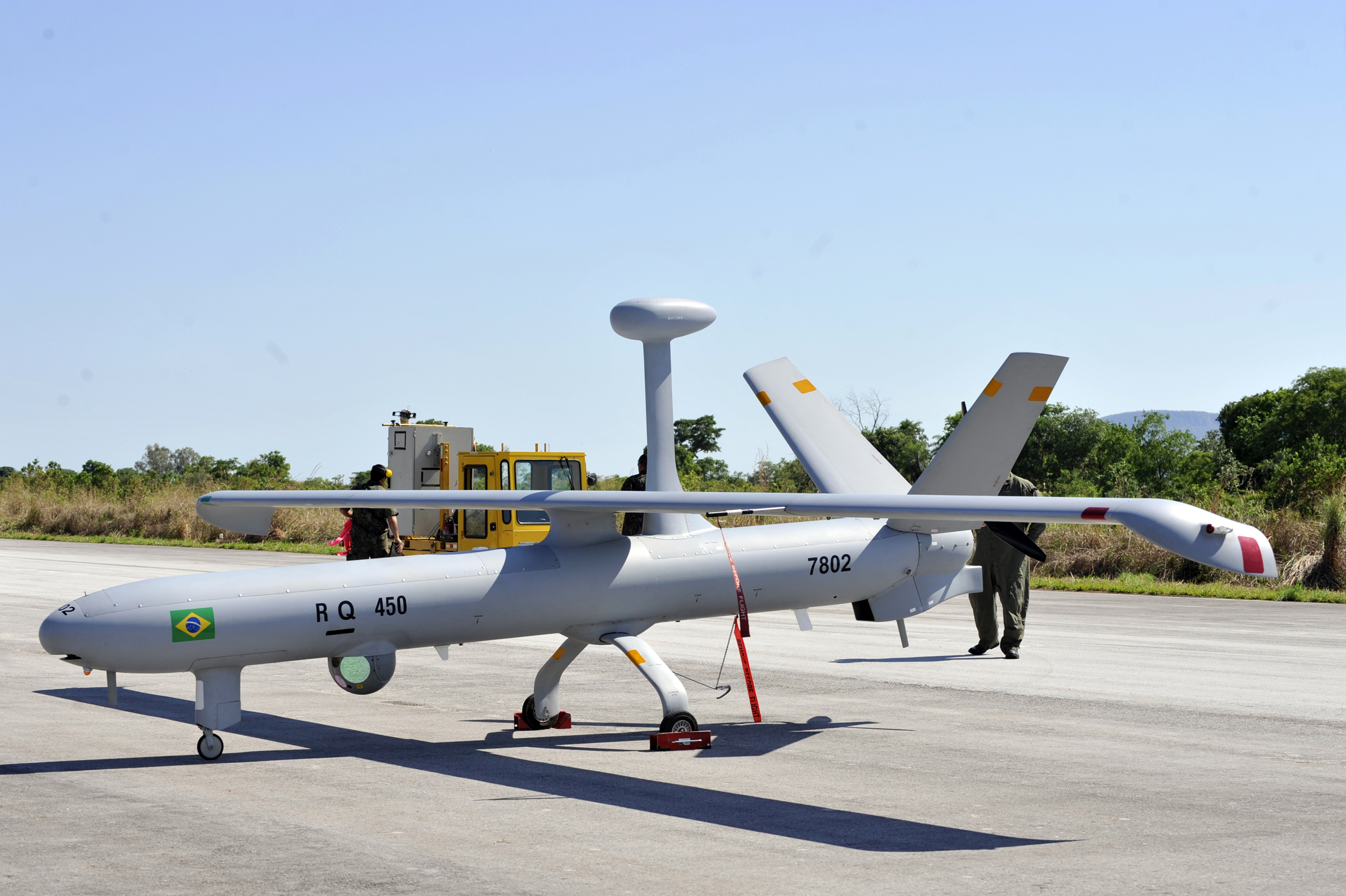
RQ-450 UAV

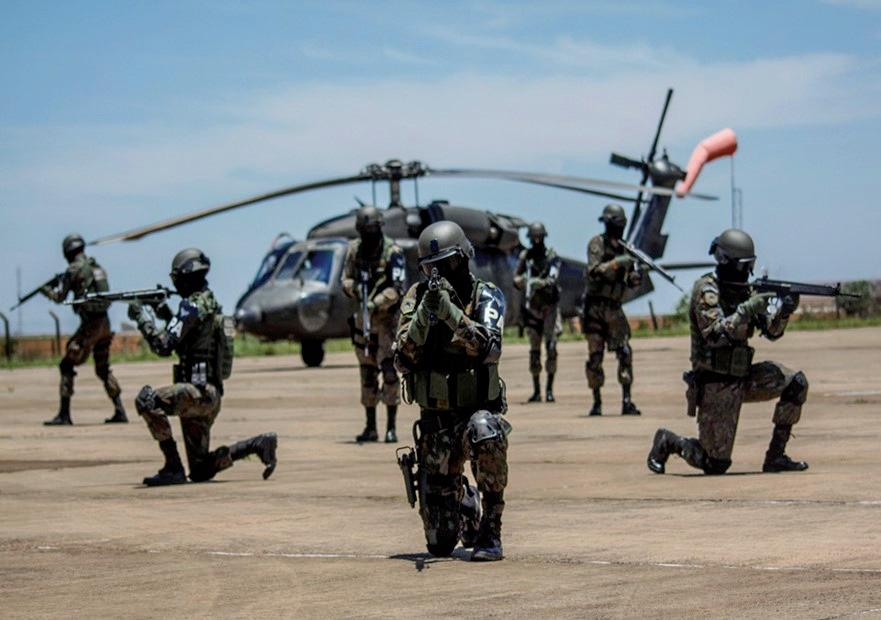
Brazilian Air Force Infantry

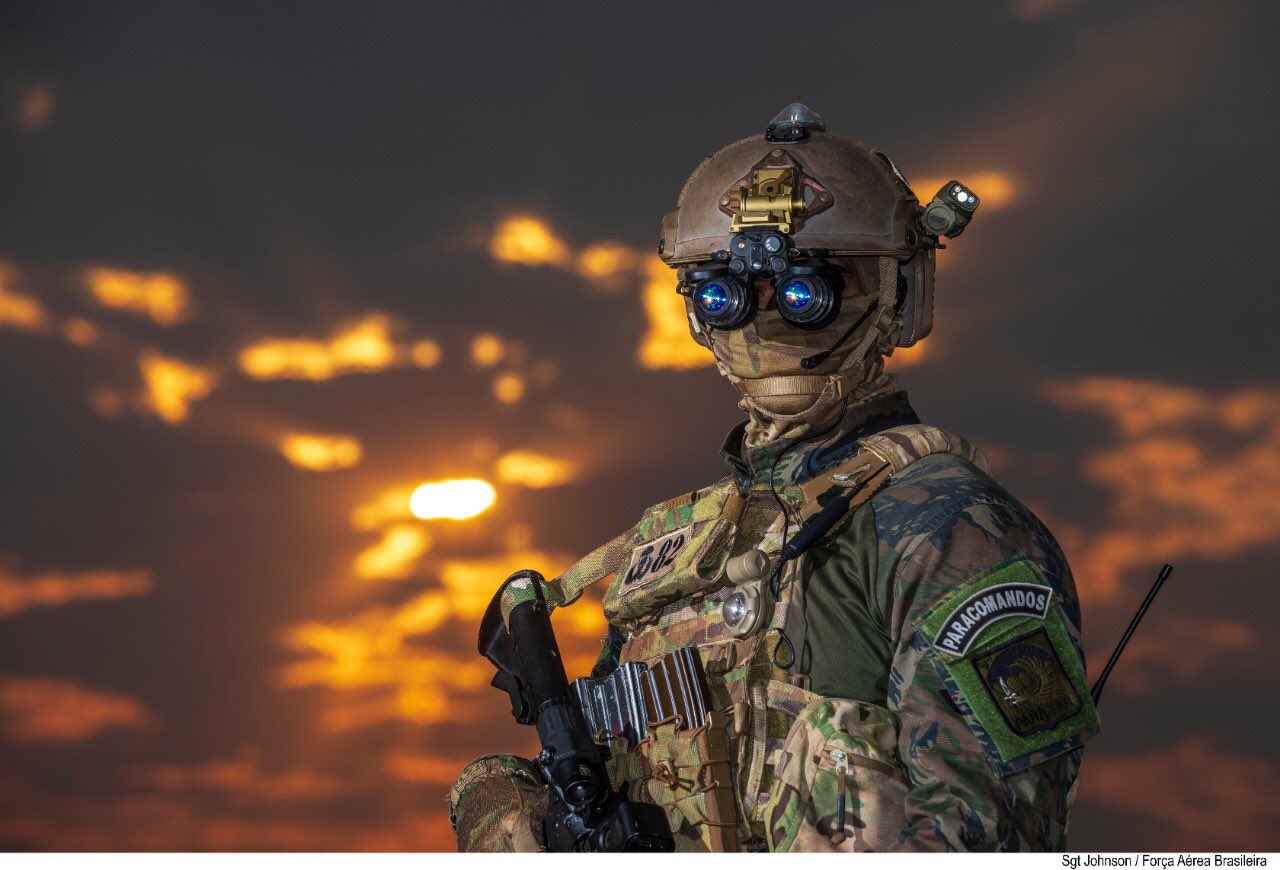
Air Force SOF (Para-SAR)

== Brazilian aerospace command ==
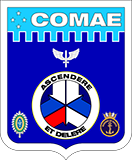
Coat of arms of Aerospace Operations Command

The Aerospace Operations Command is a Brazilian air and space command created in 2017 and is part of the Brazilian Air Force. It is responsible for planning, coordinating, executing and controlling the country's air and space operations. The Brazilian Navy and Brazilian Army also are part of the organization.

== Troop relocation ==
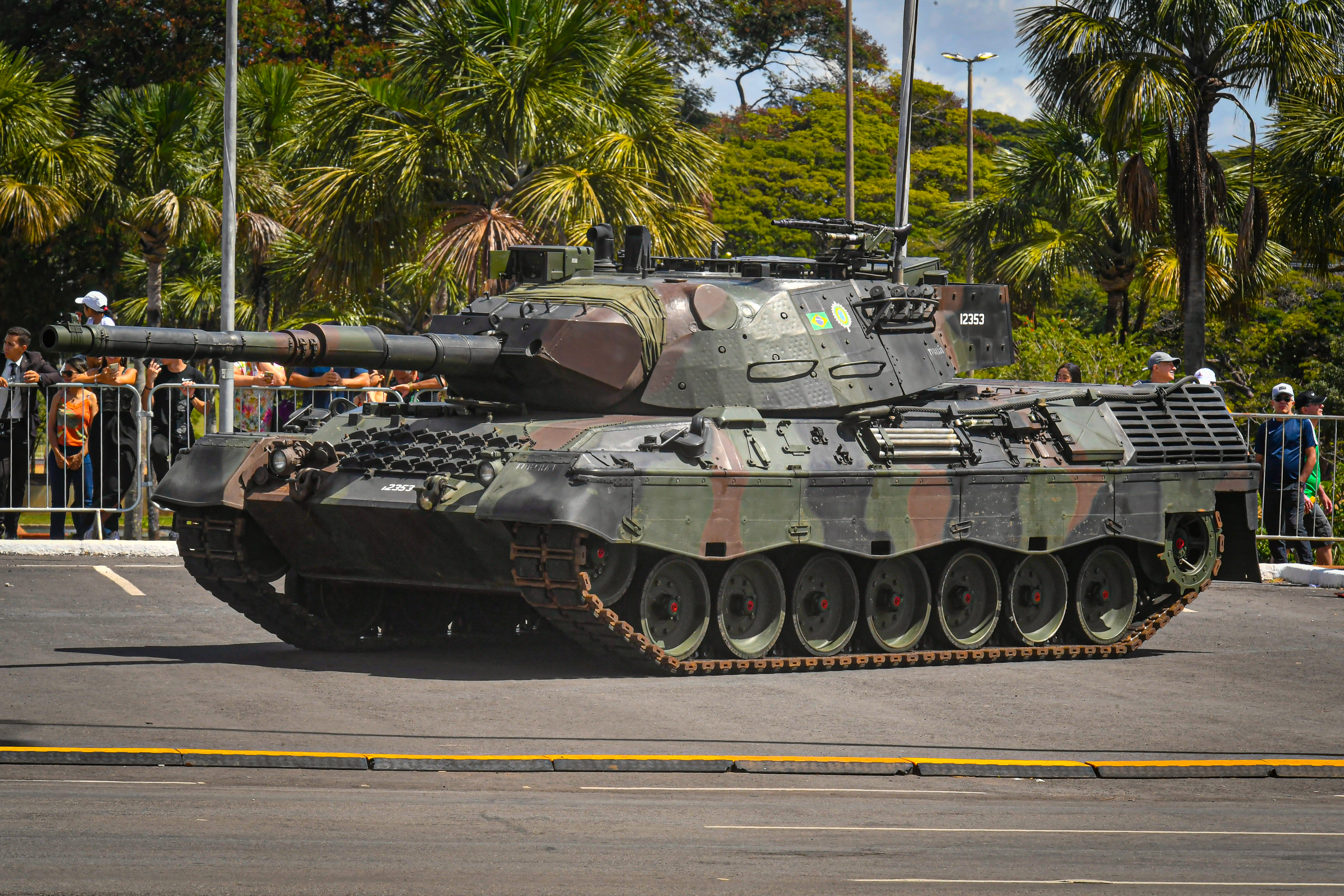
Leopard 1A5BR

Brazil has the need to patrol its 16,880 kilometers (10,490 mi) of land borders. Since the 1990s Brazil has been relocating its forces in accordance to this national security requirement.

Between 1992 and 2008, the 1st, 2nd and 16th Jungle Infantry Brigades, the 3rd Infantry Battalion, the 19th Logistics Battalion, and the 22nd Army Police Platoon were transferred by the Army from the states of Rio de Janeiro and Rio Grande do Sul to the Amazon region in accordance with the friendship policy with Argentina. After those redeployments the number of Army troops in that region rose to 25,000. Also relocated from the state of Rio de Janeiro were the 1st and 3rd Tank Regiments, now stationed in the city of Santa Maria, in the state of Rio Grande do Sul.

However, despite those efforts, the presence of the Armed Forces on the border regions of the Brazilian Amazon continues to be sparse and disperse, given the fact that the Army has just 28 border detachments in that area, a total of 1,600 soldiers, or 1 man for every 7 km (4.3 mi) of borders. More redeployments are expected since the states of Rio de Janeiro, Minas Gerais and Espírito Santo still concentrate over 49,000 soldiers. In May 2008, the Navy announced new plans to reposition its forces throughout Brazil.

== Communications and territorial surveillance ==
The Brazilian territory corresponds to 47.3% of the South American continent, and its land border is over 16.000 km and 4,5 million km2 of sea territory. With the objective of ensuring Brazil's sovereignty, strategic monitoring and communications projects have been launched in recent years.

=== SGDC ===
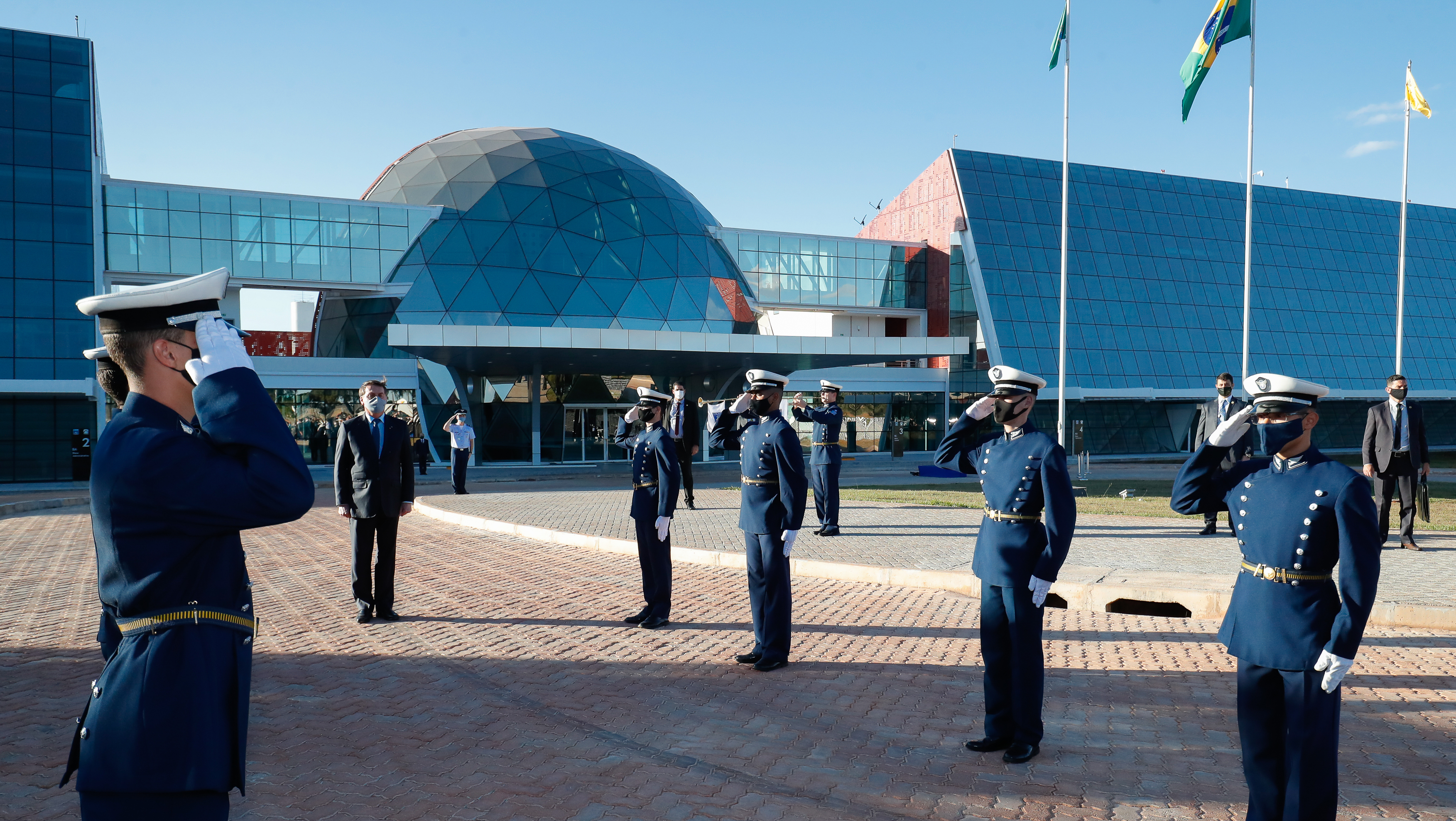
Inauguration of the Space Operations Center in Brasília, June 2020.

The Geostationary Defense and Strategic Communications Satellites or SGDC, are geostationary communication satellites developed by the Brazilian Air Force and the Brazilian Space Agency, created with the objective of operating strategic military, government and civil communications, also offering broadband internet throughout the national territory. The first satellite called SGDC-1, was launched in 2017 and the SGDC-2 has planned to launch in 2022. The Space Operations Center (COPE) was inaugurated in 2020, subordinated to the Aerospace Operations Command, with the objective of operating the satellites.

=== SISFRON ===
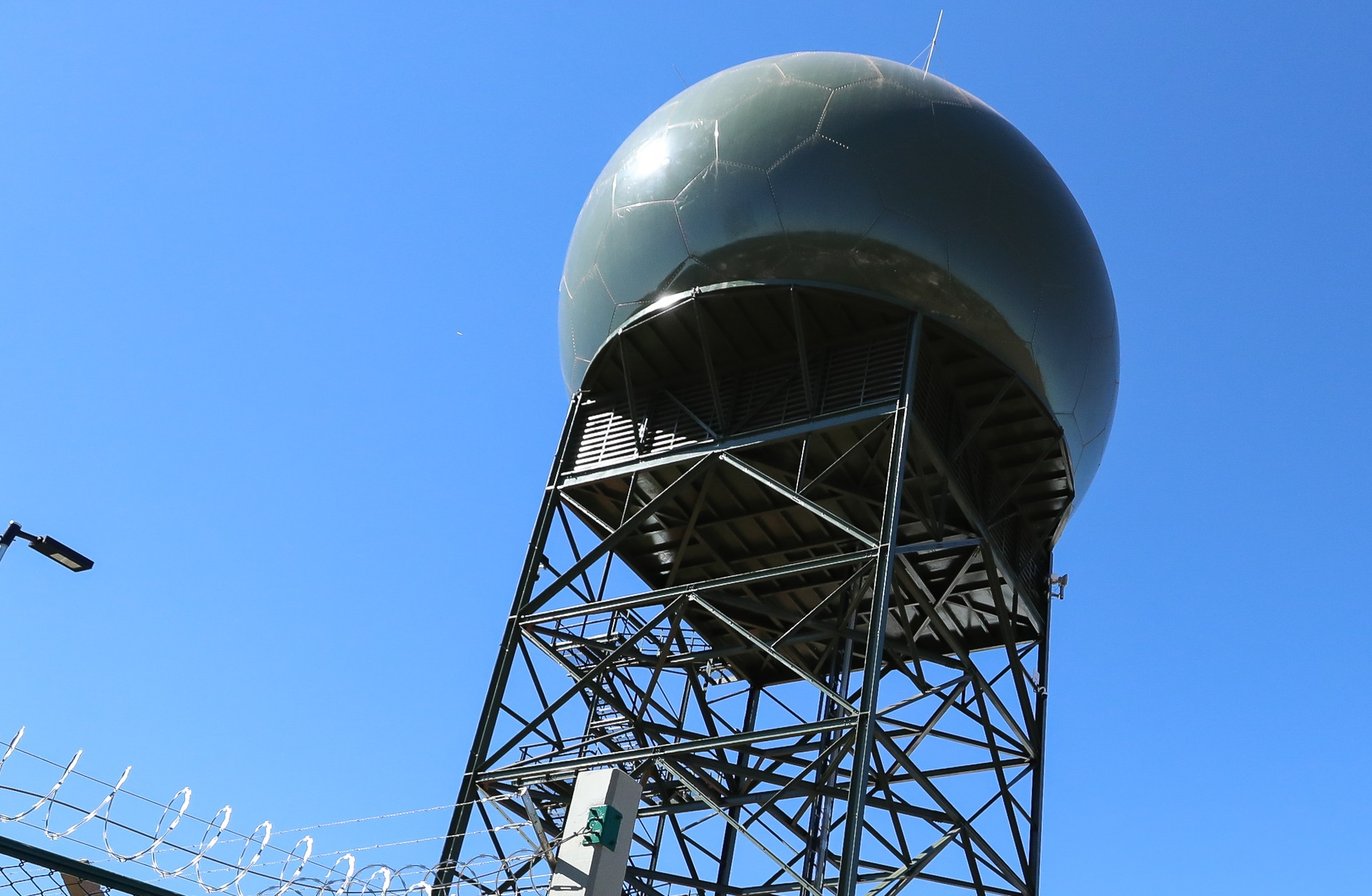
Ponta Porã radar station

The Integrated Border Monitoring System (SISFRON) is a border system developed by the Brazilian Army for supporting operational employment decisions, operating in an integrated manner with all defense systems in the country, whose purpose is to strengthen the presence and capacity for monitoring and action in the national land border strip. It was conceived at the initiative of the Army Command, as a result of the approval of the National Defense Strategy in 2008, which guides the organization of the Armed Forces. SISFRON is planned to eventually cover the 16,886 kilometers of the border line, favoring the employment of organizations subordinate to the North, West, Southern and the Amazon military commands.

=== SisGAAz ===
The Blue Amazon Management System, is a surveillance system planned by the Brazilian Navy, in order to oversee the "Blue Amazon", the country's exclusive economic zone and continental shelf, a resource-rich area covering about 4,500,000 km^{2} (1,700,000 sq mi) off the Brazilian coast. This area is home to a huge diversity of marine species, valuable metallic minerals and other mineral resources, petroleum, and the world's second largest rare-earth reserve. The SisGAAz will integrate equipment and systems composed of radars incorporated on land and vessels, as well as high resolution cameras and features such as the fusion of information received from collaborative systems.

=== Link-BR2 ===
The Link-BR2 is a datalink developed by the Air Force and the Brazilian defence company AEL Sistemas, this technology allow the exchange of data such radar information, videos and images with other units of the three branches anytime and anywhere, using an advanced encrypted protocol with a high degree of security.

== See also ==
- Joint Staff of the Armed Forces
- Brazilian Naval Aviation
- Brazilian Navy
  - Brazilian Marines
- Brazilian Army
  - Brazilian Army Aviation
- Brazilian Air Force
- National Force of Public Safety
- National Defense Council (Brazil)
- Brazil and weapons of mass destruction
- Policing in Brazil
  - Military Police of Brazilian States
  - Rondas Ostensivas Tobias de Aguiar: Military Police of the State of São Paulo.
  - BOPE: Special Police Operations Battalion of the Military Police of the State of Rio de Janeiro, Brazil.
  - Military Police of Rio de Janeiro State
- List of Wars involving Brazil
- Military of the Empire of Brazil

== Bibliography ==
- International Institute for Strategic Studies (14 February 2018). The Military Balance 2018. London: Routledge. ISBN 9781857439557.
- International Institute for Strategic Studies (7 March 2012). The Military Balance 2012. London: Routledge. ISBN 978-1857436426.
