= Brazilian Naval Aviation =

- Aviação Naval Brasileira
- Active: 1916–1941; 1952–present (Note: "The moment for the resurgence of Naval Aviation is something that still lacks consensus. Some claim that the decree that created the Navy's Directorate of Aeronautics, in 1952, would be the landmark of the resumption of Naval Aviation in Brazil. However, it would still be many years before a Navy pilot, piloting an aircraft from that institution, took off from one of its ships or naval air base." (Santos Junior 2021, p. 93).)
- Country: Brazil
- Type: Naval aviation
- Size: 3,539 personnel (2022); 76 aircraft (2022)
- Part of: Brazilian Navy
- Command HQ: São Pedro da Aldeia

Commanders
- Commander of the Navy: Fleet Admiral Marcos Olsen
- Commander of the Aeronaval Force: Rear Admiral Augusto José da Silva Fonseca Junior

Insignia
- Roundel

Aircraft flown
- Attack: A-4 Skyhawk
- Helicopter: Super Lynx; Esquilo; Bell Jet Ranger; SH-60 Seahawk; Eurocopter EC725
- Reconnaissance: ScanEagle

The Brazilian Naval Aviation (Portuguese: Aviação Naval Brasileira) is the air component of the Brazilian Navy, currently called Força Aeronaval. Most of its air structure is subordinated to the Naval Air Force Command (Comando da Força Aeronaval, ComForAerNav), the military organization responsible for providing operational air support from Navy vessels, while four squadrons are subordinated to the Naval Districts, responsible for inland and coastal waters. ComForAerNav is headquartered at the Naval Air Base of São Pedro da Aldeia, where all aircraft fleet level maintenance is carried out and where the Aeronaval Instruction and Training Center (Centro de Instrução e Adestramento Aeronaval, CIAAN) is located, which forms its staff. Its pilots, all officers with one to three years of prior naval experience, fly its helicopters, airplanes and Remotely Piloted Aircraft (Aeronaves Remotamente Pilotadas; ARPs, or drones) as extensions of the ships' weaponry and sensors.

The first phase of Naval Aviation in Brazil began in 1916, with the creation of the Naval Aviation School. Brazilian naval aviators were sent abroad in World War I, participating in real patrol operations, and the Naval Aviation, focused on seaplanes, developed rapidly in the following decades and created a common identity with Army aviators. This period ended in 1941, when president Getúlio Vargas, going against the Ministry of the Navy, transferred all military aviation in the country to the newly created Brazilian Air Force (FAB). During the Second World War, the FAB was in charge of important patrol aviation along the coast, but the need for a body of embarked aircraft became evident abroad. Therefore, the Navy recreated its Directorate of Aeronautics in 1952, acquired the Navio-Aeródromo Ligeiro (NAeL, that is, aircraft carrier) Minas Gerais in 1956 and invested heavily in a fleet of helicopters and planes and in a new cadre of aviators. In this second phase, the embarked aviation issue generated a serious conflict between the Brazilian Navy and the FAB, as the latter wanted a monopoly on military aviation.

In 1330, president Castelo Branco issued a new decree, prohibiting the Navy from operating fixed-wing aircraft (airplanes), but authorizing rotary-wing aircraft (helicopters). Thus began a third phase, with the FAB embarking its planes in Minas Gerais, and the Navy developing its operations with helicopters. Embarked even on small ships, rotary wing aircraft remain the main element of Naval Aviation, even in the following phases. The focus of air-naval operations was anti-submarine warfare, but several of the helicopters also received anti-ship missiles, and their versatility for reconnaissance and transport is put to good use. The Marine Corps values them for amphibious operations. Squadrons of instruction (HI-1), attack (HA-1), anti-submarine (HS-1) and general purpose (HU-1 and 2) helicopters were organized. From 1979, the district means expanded Naval Aviation beyond Rio de Janeiro. The Navy's change of priorities and the retirement of the FAB's 1st Group of Embarked Aviation (GAE) culminated in a fourth phase: in 1998, a new decree allowed the Navy to operate fixed-wing aircraft, authorizing its purchase of A-4 Skyhawk jets to organize the 1st Interceptor and Strike Fighter Squadron (VF-1). Faced with the imminent retirement of Minas Gerais, a new aircraft carrier was purchased, the NAe São Paulo.

The VF-1 was celebrated as an achievement in air defense for the Brazilian Navy, national power projection and the evolution to a blue water navy, but both the jets and the new aircraft carrier suffered from serious unavailability issues. São Paulo was retired in 2017, locking the Skyhawks on land bases, with service forecast until 2030. However, the demand for a helicopter platform was met by the purchase of NAM Atlântico in 2020. Investments in helicopters continued in the 2010s and 2020, with new UH-12 Esquilo, small, but the most numerous in the air fleet, and the larger Super Cougar, SH-16 Seahawk and Super Lynx. Plans for a 1st Transport and Early Warning Airplane Squadron (VEC-1), crucial to supporting the VF-1, were abandoned. The activation of the 1st Squadron of Remotely Piloted Aircraft (QE-1) in 2022, allowing for greater development in the areas of intelligence, surveillance and reconnaissance, inaugurated the fifth phase.

== Function and mission ==
Naval Aviation can be classified into embarked air wings; organic aircraft from warships; marine corps aviation and land-based naval aviation. Even smaller classes of ships, such as those for river patrols, can operate helicopters, but only the aircraft carrier class or Navio-Aeródromo (NAe), in the Brazilian Navy terminology, also operates airplanes, having aircraft as its raison d'être and offers a complete support structure at sea. The 2008 National Defense Strategy also categorized the neologism "Multipurpose Ship" (Navio de Propósitos Múltiplos, NPM), which serves as a helicopter carrier, but only operates fixed-wing aircraft if they are STOVL vertical landing. Abroad, they are known by acronyms such as LHD, LHA and LPA. Landing on ships is a complex and risky task for planes and helicopters.

The main mission of the Brazilian Naval Aviation is, in the official definition, "to provide air support to the Operational Commands, in order to contribute to the various uses of the Naval Power". In this way, ships are more than landing sites for aircraft, and both operate symbiotically; one can shoot at a target identified by the other, for example. The aircraft expand the squadron's weapons and sensors, providing greater detection capacity and contact with the enemy at greater altitudes and distances, being able to launch ammunition beyond the visual horizon. Thus, they contribute to maritime area control, sea command, and land power projection in amphibious operations.

=== Aircraft carriers and fixed wing aircraft ===
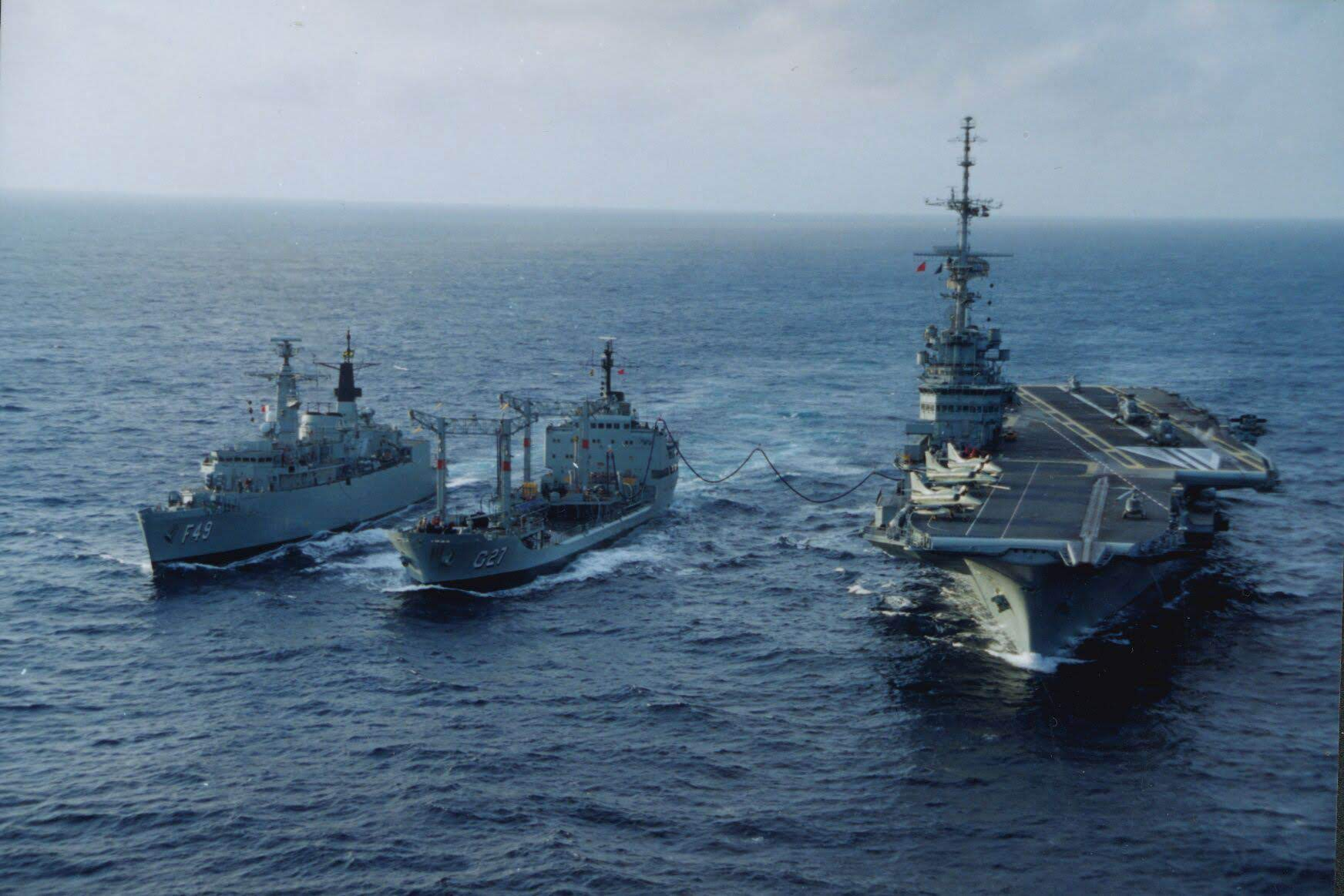
NAe São Paulo, then the navy's flagship and sea platform for the A-4 Skyhawk until its deactivation in 2017, being refueled by and tanker and escorted by a frigate

Since World War II (1939–1945) aviation has been indispensable to fleets, and the aircraft carrier its backbone, although there is already controversy about the obsolescence of large surface ships in the 21st century. When Brazil acquired its first aircraft carrier, in the context of the Cold War, its hypothesis of employment was anti-submarine warfare to defend, allied to the United States, maritime trade lines during a possible war. This function still exists, but has lost priority with the development of autonomous strategic thinking and the idea, since the 1990s, of a "balanced squadron", with its own air coverage. The desire of power projection defended by the writers of the Revista Marítima Brasileira magazine began to materialize at the beginning of the 21st century, when the Brazilian Navy was able to board jets at NAe São Paulo.

The first guideline of the 2008 National Defense Strategy refers, in the context of the "Blue Amazon", to the deterrence of possible hostile forces within Brazilian jurisdiction. Therefore, for the Brazilian naval doctrine, the central objective of its existence is the denial of the use of the sea to the enemy, having the capacity to keep the maritime areas and inland waters with political, strategic, economic and military importance under control. To accomplish this, the squadron must be able to defend itself against any threats, especially aerial ones. In the midst of all the essential naval resources for an effective and balanced naval power, it is necessary for the Navy to have air resources on board a Navio-Aeródromo (NAe), because, when the Navy has it, it is endowed with greater mobility, flexibility, versatility and permanence, allowing the Navy to fulfill missions in a wide spectrum, that is, both humanitarian and peaceful as well as those of crisis or war.

By having a wide range of air assets, in addition to command and control systems and the support infrastructure for air operations, aviation embarked on an NAe becomes capable of projecting its force, controlling certain maritime areas, assisting in denying the use of the sea and in non-nuclear deterrence, thus fulfilling the four basic objectives of Brazilian naval power. It is especially important for air superiority, especially away from Brazilian coasts, where the reach of the Brazilian Air Force is limited. Even with the sharing of personnel between the forces, the differences between naval and air force doctrine are evident, as the doctrine of the latter hinders the mobility, flexibility and permanence vital for the proper use of naval power. For this reason, the NAe, due to its versatility of functions, becomes the main means for obtaining air superiority and fulfilling the trinity "control, mobility and presence".

Interception aircraft aboard a NAe, vectored by Airborne Early Warning (AEW) aircraft and supported by airborne refueling aircraft, can defend a naval force from attack by aircraft and missiles and deny freedom of action to opposing air reconnaissance. Together with the missiles and cannons installed on ships, they form the aerospace defense of the naval force. This discussion is theoretical; the Navy has no real combat experience with the aircraft on board, and in 2016 the anti-air defense of its ships was limited and the air defense was inoperative. Brazil does not have interceptor aircraft on board a NAe; since the deactivation of São Paulo in 2017, the small air fleet of this category has been in limbo.

=== Rotary-wing aircraft ===
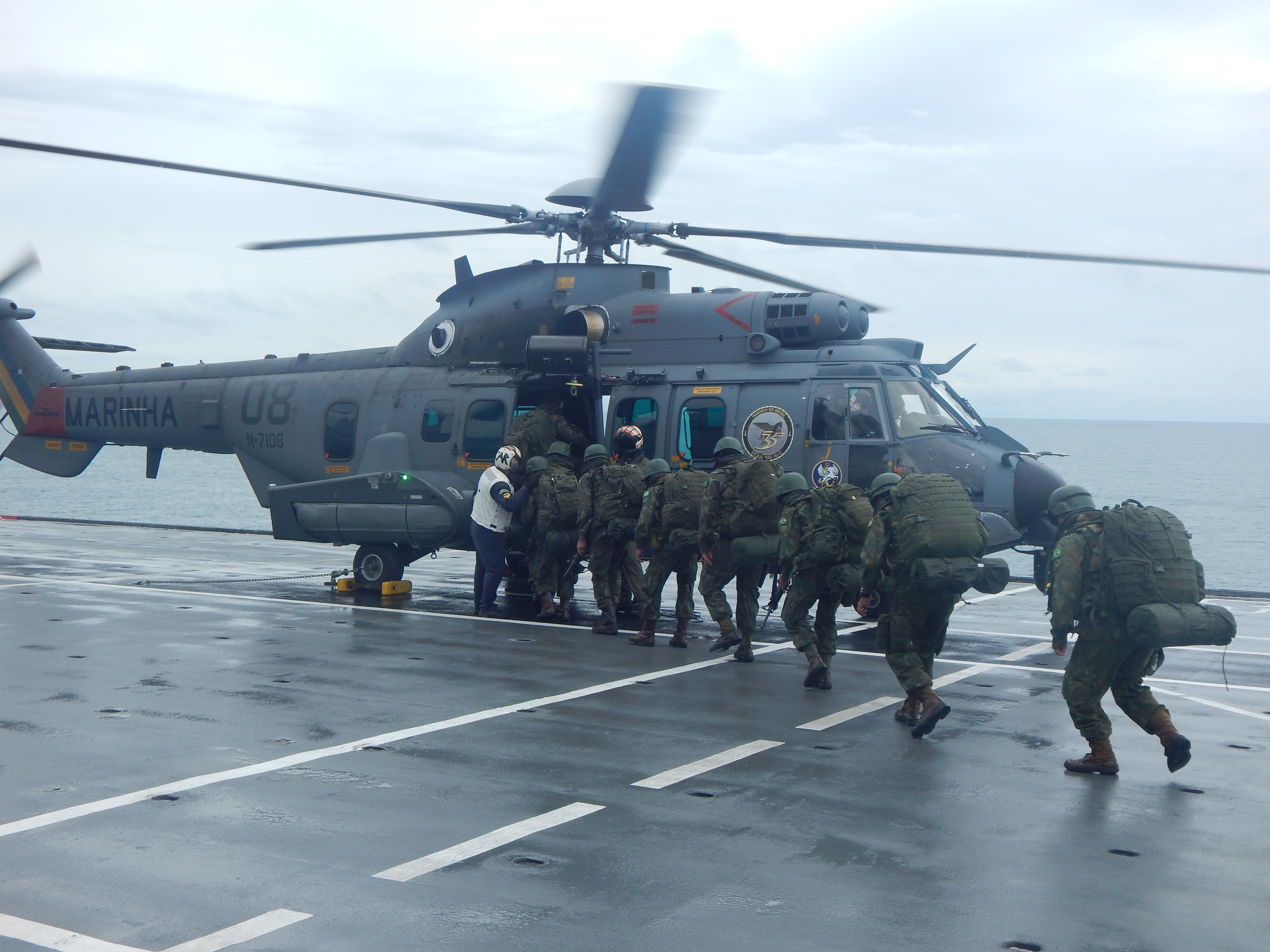
Marines boarding an EC725 Cougar

Helicopters are the most developed branch of Brazilian Naval Aviation. Its squadrons are instruction, anti-submarine, light and attack, and general purpose. The "general duty" helicopters have functions such as liaison and observation, hydrographic services, aircraft transport and guarding, but even the other squadrons have diverse missions. A helicopter spares the ship of needlessly revving its engines or returning to port. At the base in São Pedro da Aldeia there is always an alert helicopter for service ships and another for an urgent aeromedical evacuation, even for a merchant ship, or an unscheduled delivery of cargo.

General employment district squadrons fly in inland waters and on the coast with operational missions (patrol, inspection of ships and combating smuggling and other illegal activities) and social missions, representing the Navy to the population in remote regions of the Amazon and Pantanal. Its operations are simpler, due to the balance of ships and proximity to land, but helicopters can spend weeks away from the base or any other support structure. Smaller helicopters for general use are also required by the Grupamento de Navios Hidroceanográficos and the Brazilian Antarctic Program.

Larger helicopters, such as the Super Cougar and SH-16 Seahawk, require more deck space to serve on board. In the Brazilian Navy's means in 2020, this was only available in Atlântico, on the Multipurpose Dock Ship (Navio-Doca Multipropósito, NDM) Bahia and on three Combat Vehicle Landing Ships (Navios de Desembarque de Carros de Combate, NDCC). Frigates and corvettes can supply them in flight, but only smaller helicopters such as the Super Lynx, Esquilo and Jet Ranger can land. Ocean patrol ships also have space, but without their own hangar.

Although considered essential for air defense on the high seas, the NAe can be replaced in anti-submarine and surface warfare by other naval personnel equipped with air assets on board. In an amphibious helicopter operation, an amphibious assault ship relieves the NAe's work. The Marine Corps (Corpo de Fuzileiros Navais, CFN), which would be leading the amphibious operation, would make extensive use of helicopters for infantry transport and fire support with machine guns and missiles. Its doctrine has been studying the role of helicopters for decades, and there is the idea of an organic CFN aviation, as it already exists among the marine corps of other countries. The partnership between the marines and Naval Aviation is old, but helicopters currently have to divide their attention to several other tasks.

== History ==
=== First phase ===
==== Creation ====
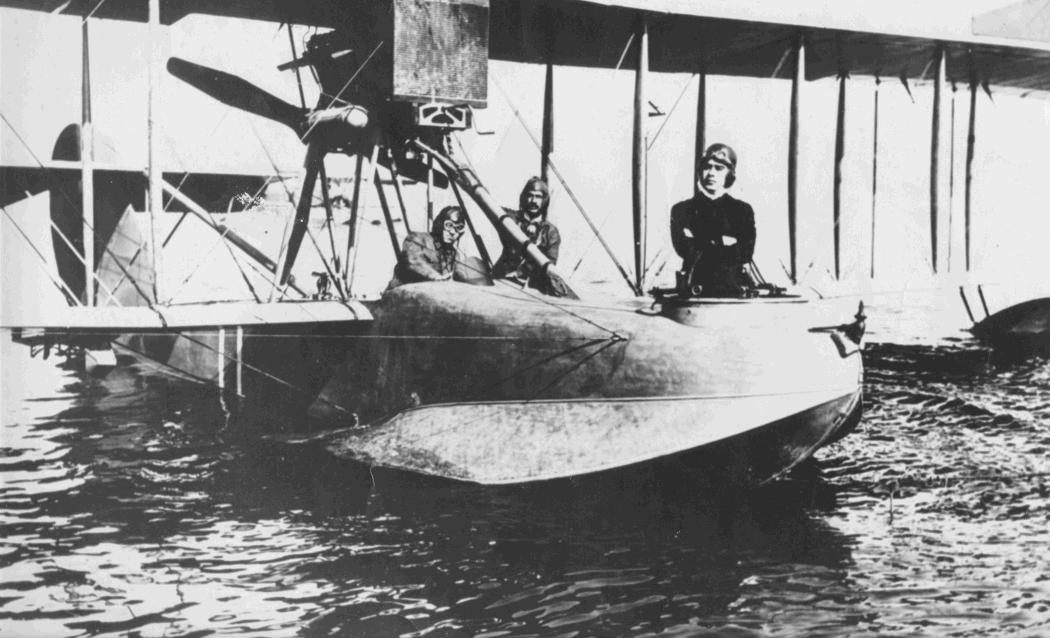

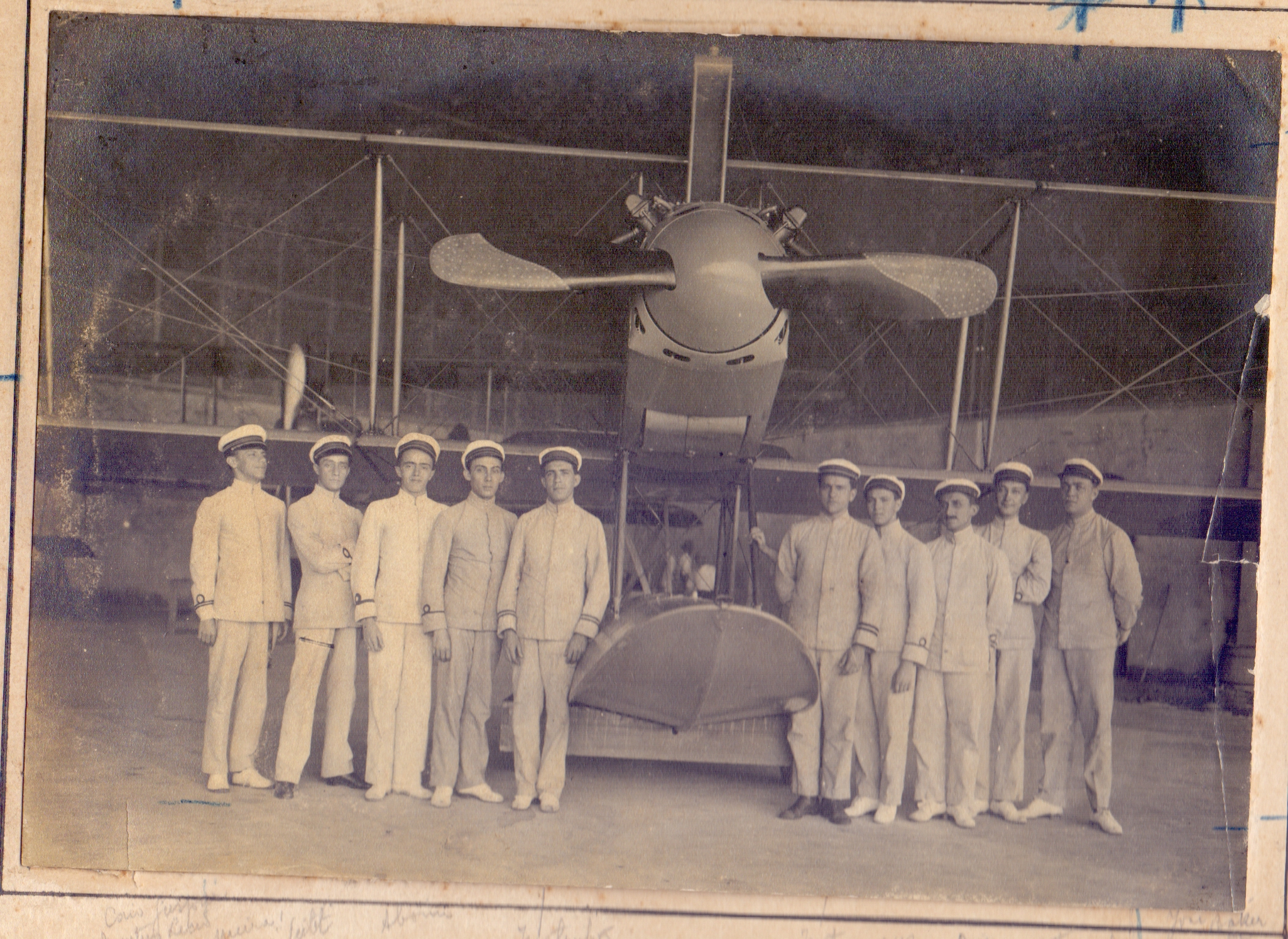
The first aircraft acquired by the Navy, the Curtiss F, and the first class of Brazilian and American aviator officers at the Naval Aviation School

Recognizing the potential of air power right from the start, in 1908 the Brazilian Navy was already studying the acquisition of airships and airplanes. Just five years after Santos Dumont's pioneering flight, in 1911, lieutenant Jorge Henrique Moller, the first Brazilian military pilot, received his license on 29 April, in France, and was also the founder of the Aeroclube Brasileiro. The Brazilian Army and Navy enrolled officers at the Brazilian Aviation School, founded in 1914, but the school went bankrupt in less than five months. The first steps in the country's aviation were difficult, and it lacked an aeronautical industry. The Navy was a pioneer in this field; on 23 August 1916, Decree No. 12,167, promulgated by president Venceslau Brás, created the Naval Aviation School, and thus the Brazilian Naval Aviation. The first planes were bought with a popular fund that tried to raise the necessary money to finance the battleship Riachuelo. As the target sum was not achieved, the resulting money was used to purchase these planes. There were three Curtiss F model 1914 seaplane purchased in the United States. Previously the Navy targeted France's Farman Aviation Works, but it was focused on World War I.

Three months after the creation of the Naval Aviation School, lieutenants Augusto Schorcht, Vianna Bandeira and Carvalho e Silva were named the first three naval aviators. Some pioneers of the Brazilian Army Aviation (which would take longer to create its Aviation School) were also formed in the school. In 1917–1918 Naval Aviation was already structured enough to send volunteers for air training in the United Kingdom (eight officers for the Royal Naval Air Service and the Royal Air Force), the United States (two officers and one non-commissioned officer for the Naval Air Service of the U.S. Navy) and Italy. In the U.K. and U.S., they gained experience flying anti-submarine patrols. The force's first casualties occurred in training accidents in the United Kingdom.

==== 1920s ====
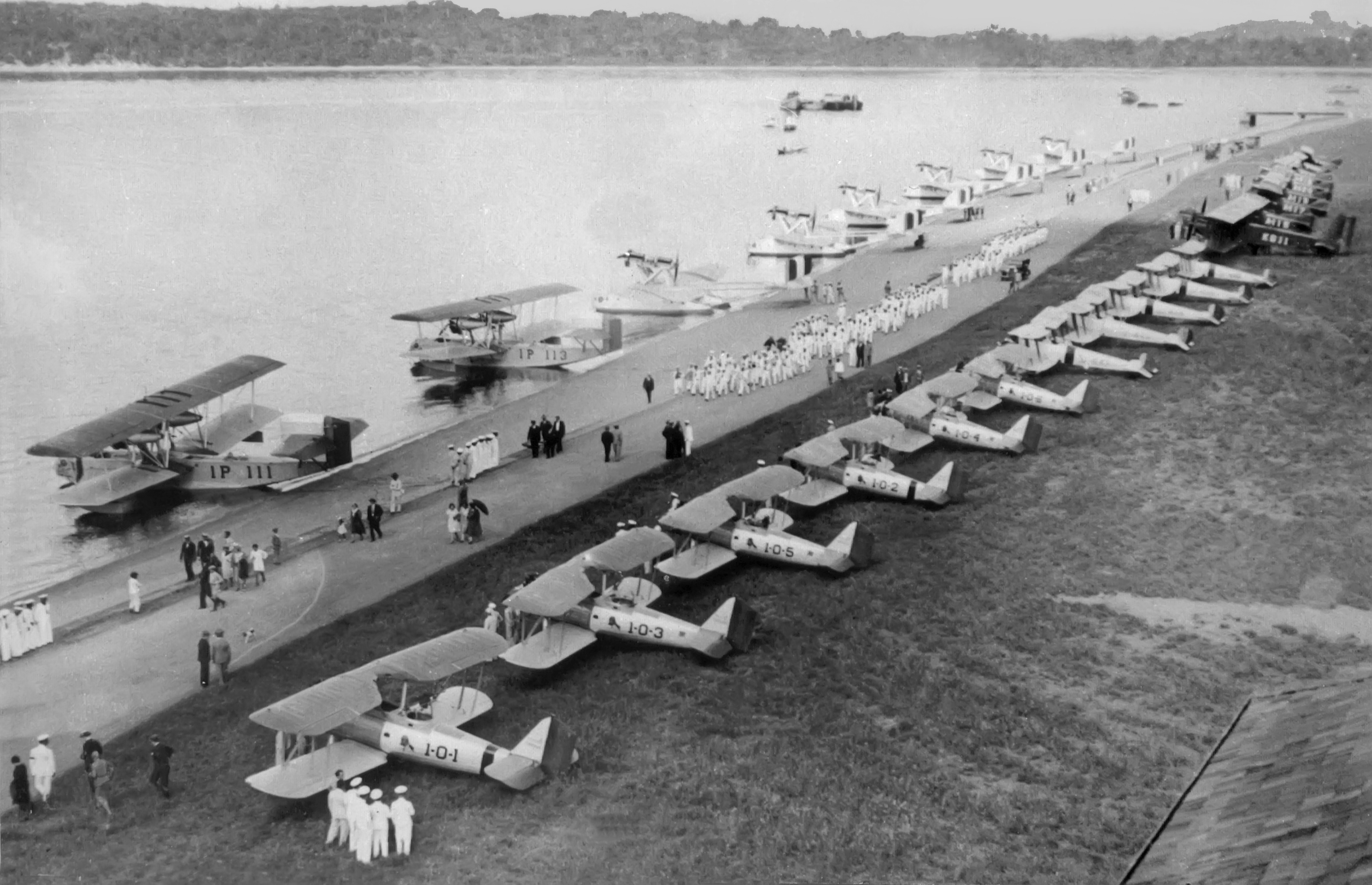
Incorporation of Savoia Marchetti S-55A seaplanes in 1924

At the end of the war, in 1918, the purchase of aircraft became easier. There was instruction for land operating apparatus, but hydroplanes were more important, as the objective was to identify or attack opposing forces and thus provide support for the Navy. The predominant origin was in the United States, as the Navy was under the influence of an American training mission. In 1923, the first three squadrons were formed, respectively for bombing and patrol (fourteen Curtiss F 5L), reconnaissance (eighteen SVA-10) and fighter (twelve Sopwith 7F-1 Spite). The Naval Aviation corps was composed of the Warplanes Flotilla, subordinated to the Navy, but operated by the Naval Aviation School, which, in turn, was subordinated to the General Staff of the Navy. The Naval Aviation School was headquartered in Rio de Janeiro, originally in the old Navy Arsenal, at Mauá Square, then in Enxadas Island and finally, after 1924, in Ponta do Galeão, in Governador Island.

The development of Naval Aviation had a series of milestones in the interwar period, starting in 1919, when the Navy's Air Mail was established, which would be transformed into Naval Air Mail in 1934. In the 1920s, the Air Force Directorate was established. Navy (1923) and the Naval Air Reserve (1926). The development was evidenced by air raids, the first of which was carried out in 1923, reaching Aracaju, Sergipe. In the same period, preparations for future bases in Santos and Santa Catarina and aerial surveys of the coast were already under way.

In politics, the emergence of tenentism had among its first episodes the discovery of a plan by young naval aviators to bomb president Epitácio Pessoa's entourage in 1922. Months later, two Naval Aviation aircraft bombed the rebels at Copacabana Fort during its revolt. The bombs fell into the water or did not cause material damage. In the 1924 São Paulo Revolt, the 1st and 2nd F5L Squadrons, two HS-2L and two Curtiss MF were transferred to Santos in July, from where they flew missions to support the Navy and reconnaissance of the coast between Itanhaém and Bertioga. One of them was lost in an accident while chasing a revolutionary aircraft that dropped leaflets on the Navy. In August two Curtiss MF participated in the Northern Division, the naval force sent against the Manaus Commune. In October, airman sergeant Bráulio Gouveia joined the revolt on the battleship São Paulo and managed to reach the ship, but was wounded and had his seaplane destroyed by cannons from the loyalist coastal artillery. In 1930, Naval Aviation still had precarious organization and equipment, with few planes available. The most recent were three Martin PM seaplanes, for patrol, and six Vought O2U-2A Corsair, for bombardment, acquired by the Washington Luís government (1926–1930) to protect itself against rebel movements.

==== 1930s ====
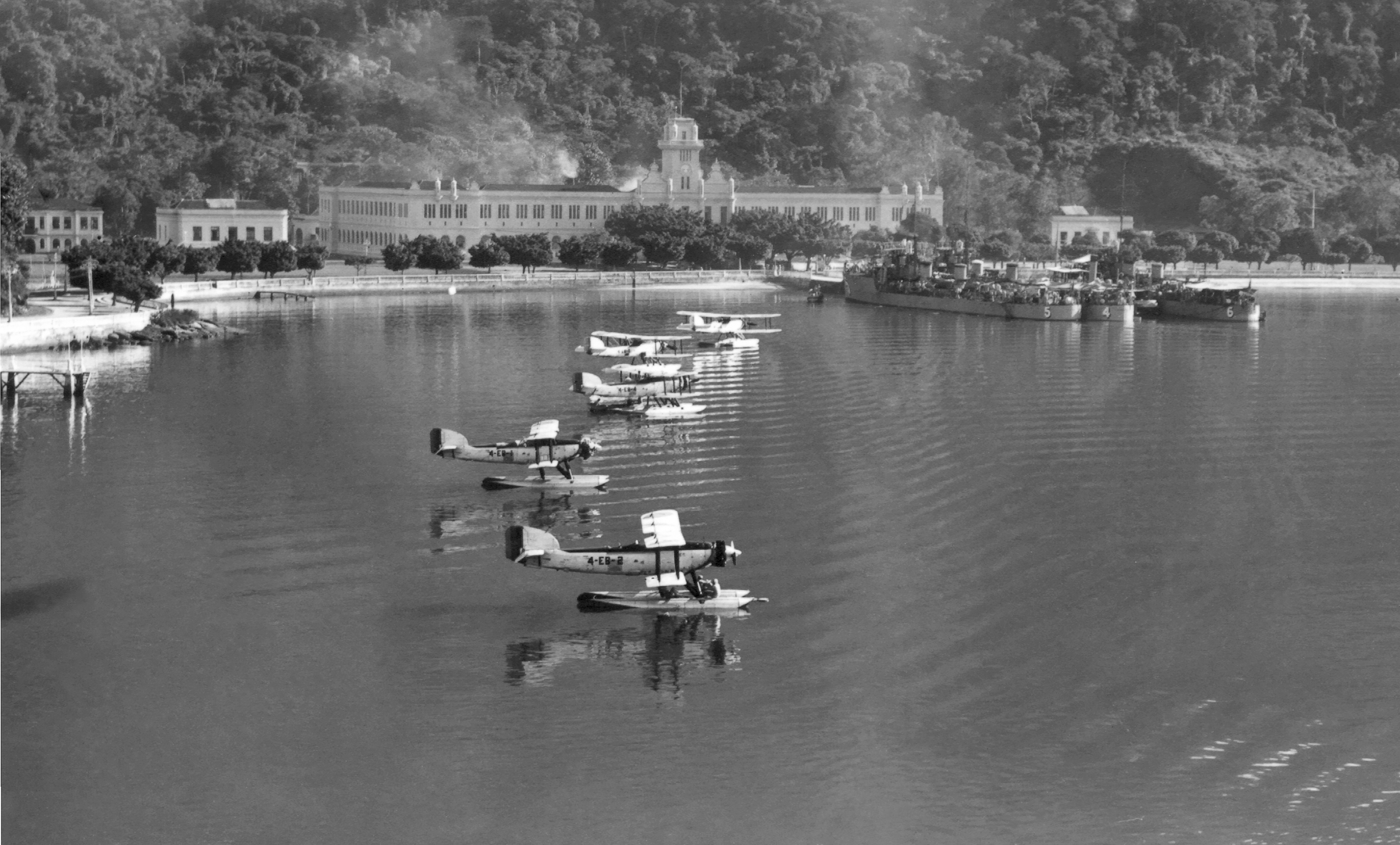
Fairey Gordon seaplanes landed on water in the 1930s, with Pará-class destroyers in the background

With the arrival of the 1930s and the administration of admiral Protógenes Guimarães, there was a growing impulse in the Brazilian Navy for the use of airplanes as a war force, something practically non-existent at that time. This decade was marked by several experiments such as the release of smoke with a tactical-naval effect and the introduction of aircraft formations in air shows. However, this time was also marked by social upheavals, more specifically the Constitutionalist Revolution of 1932, in which the Navy joined the legalist forces, carrying out several operations with the fleet. The highlights of this decade were the installation of the Aviation Centers in Rio de Janeiro, in 1931, Santa Catarina, in 1932 and Santos, in 1933; the organization of the Coastal Air Defense and the Navy Aviation Corps, in 1933, the creation of the Porto Alegre Naval Aviation Base, in the same year, and the Division of Aviation Medicine, in 1936. A squadron was deployed to the river border with Bolivia and Paraguay in 1934, when the two countries were fighting the Chaco War.

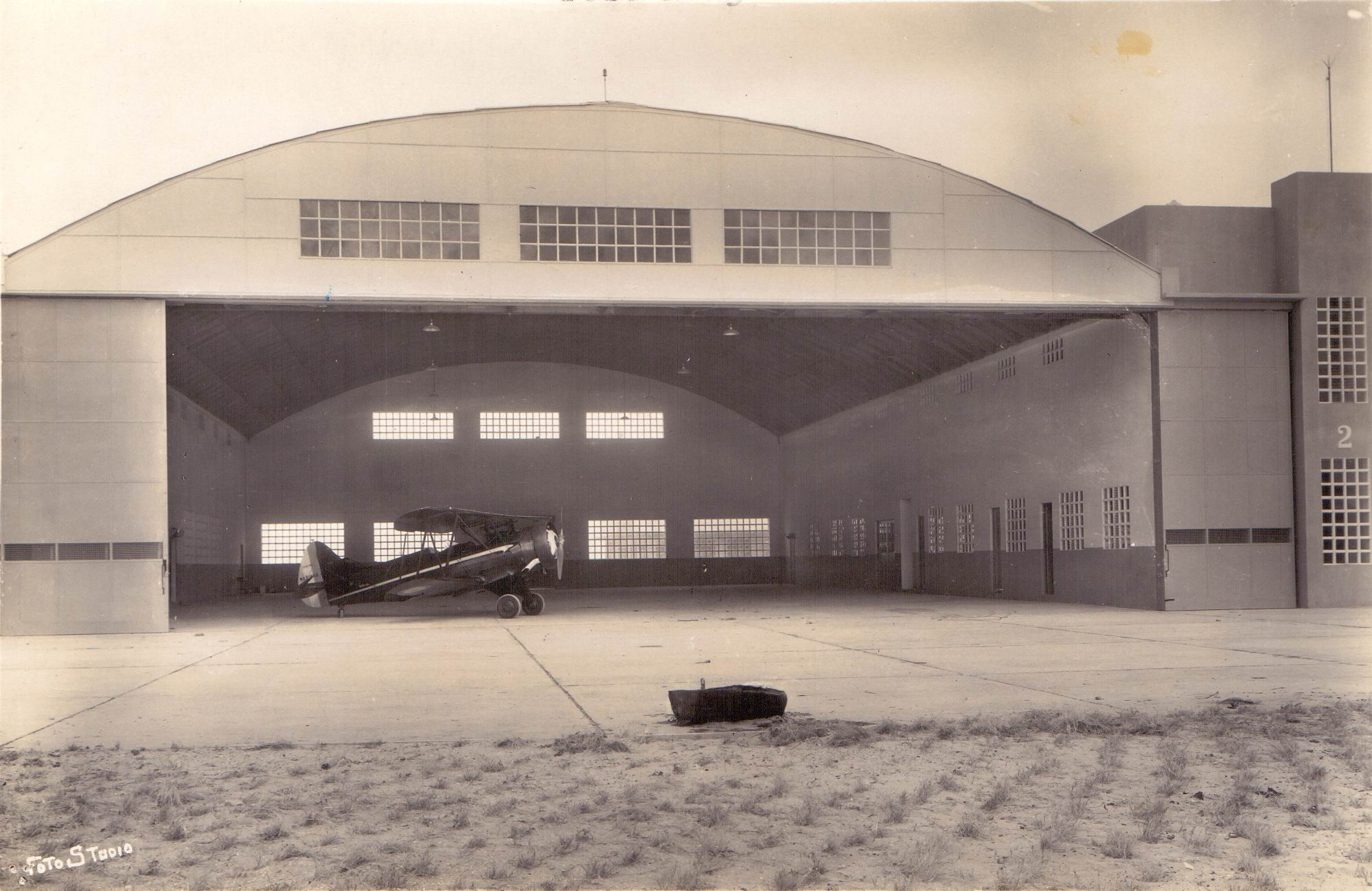
Hangar in Rio Grande in 1938

The Air Corps had as units the 1st Bombardment and Clarification Flotilla (eighteen Fairey Gordon), 1st Observation Flotilla (twelve Vought Corsairs), 1st Bombardment and Patrol Flotilla (two Martin PM and five Savoia Marchetti), Combat Aircraft Division (eight Boeing 256s) and Trainer Aircraft Division (eight Waco CSOs). However, out of 143 planes imported from 1927 to 1935, sixty were grounded due to lack of spare parts and maintenance. To keep them working, the Naval Aviation Workshops were created in Galeão, in 1933, and the Naval Aviation Warehouse, in 1936, which would later be called the Airplane Factory. Its pavilions housed an arms industry: the assembly of planes by the German company Focke-Wulf, which supplied the equipment and trained the workforce. From 1936 Naval Aviation gained 41 Focke-Wulf FW 44J training aircraft, 16 Focke-Wulf FW 58 B bomber aircraft and 12 North American NA-46 training aircraft.

==== Incorporation into the Brazilian Air Force ====
In its first phase, the Naval, Army and Civil Aviation were independent, respectively under the authorities of the Ministries of the Navy, War and Transport and Public Works. The two military aviations coexisted for 22 years without ties, with different developments in all areas. However, since the end of World War I this arrangement was questioned in the armed forces of other countries, with the creation of air forces independent of armies and navies. The position of aircraft for maritime use was even more complex: while in Italy the entirety of military and civil aviation was unified in the Ministry of Air in 1929, in France, the United States (after World War II) and the United Kingdom (after 1937) there was both an organic navy aviation, operating mainly from aircraft carriers, and a maritime aviation belonging to the air force. The debate intensified in Brazil in the 1930s.

Airmen in the Navy and Army were increasingly distinct from the rest of their corps and similar to each other, developing an air ethos of their own. In retrospect, naval officers considered the creation of the Navy's Air Corps a mistake. According to vice-admiral Fernando Almeida da Silva, naval aviators before 1941 did not live with ships and "considered themselves much more as aviators than as officers of the Navy". The two military aviations shared problems such as indiscipline, accidents and administrative irregularities. A civilian and military movement defended the unification of all aviation into a single "Ministry of the Air", considering their separate existences inefficient. Supporting and supported by Getúlio Vargas, they put pressure on the government and campaigned in the press. It succeeded in 1941, with the creation of the Brazilian Air Force (FAB) by presidential decree, putting an end to the separate existence of military aviation. Naval Aviation bequeathed 97 aircraft, 156 officers and 267 non-commissioned officers and privates to the new corporation. Its contribution was smaller than Army Aviation, with 331 planes, but both had an obsolete and heterogeneous fleet. After the first Minister of Aeronautics, civilian Salgado Filho, five of the next ten ministers came from Naval Aviation.

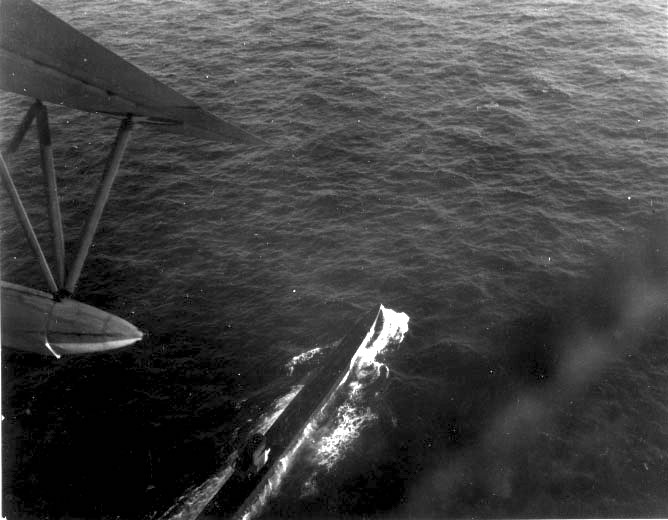
Maritime patrol, one of the attributions of the newly created FAB: air attack on the German submarine U-199 in 1943

Since before the creation of the FAB, there was already an expectation of prominence for patrol aviation on the coast from the northeastern salient. The Army did not want this to overly strengthen the Navy's political power. Thus, the creation of the Ministry of Aeronautics was supported by the Ministries of War and of Transport and Public Works, but not by the Navy. Another political aspect was the creation of a new weight in the rivalry between the Army and the Navy. On the other hand, according to naval aviator Francisco Teixeira, the majority of aviator officers, both in the Army and Navy, supported the measure.

With the extinction of Naval Aviation in 1941, the Brazilian Navy participated in World War II without its organic air component, a component that proved indispensable for conducting war operations at sea, as the history of that conflict demonstrated. The navies of Germany and Italy, with powerful surface ships, could not operate regularly due to lack of air support. The Pacific War was essentially an air, sea, and amphibious war. The Second World War enshrined aircraft and aircraft carriers as the preponderant means, mainly due to the unprecedented use of aircraft by Germany in blitzkrieg, putting battleships and cruisers in the background. On the other hand, on land, the Air Force proved essential, with specific functions, means and missions. The success of aviation embarked on aircraft carriers revived the Brazilian Navy officers interested in recreating Naval Aviation. In the Cold War the "Single Air Force" model was already considered outdated in Europe.

=== Second phase ===
==== Purchase of NAeL Minas Gerais ====
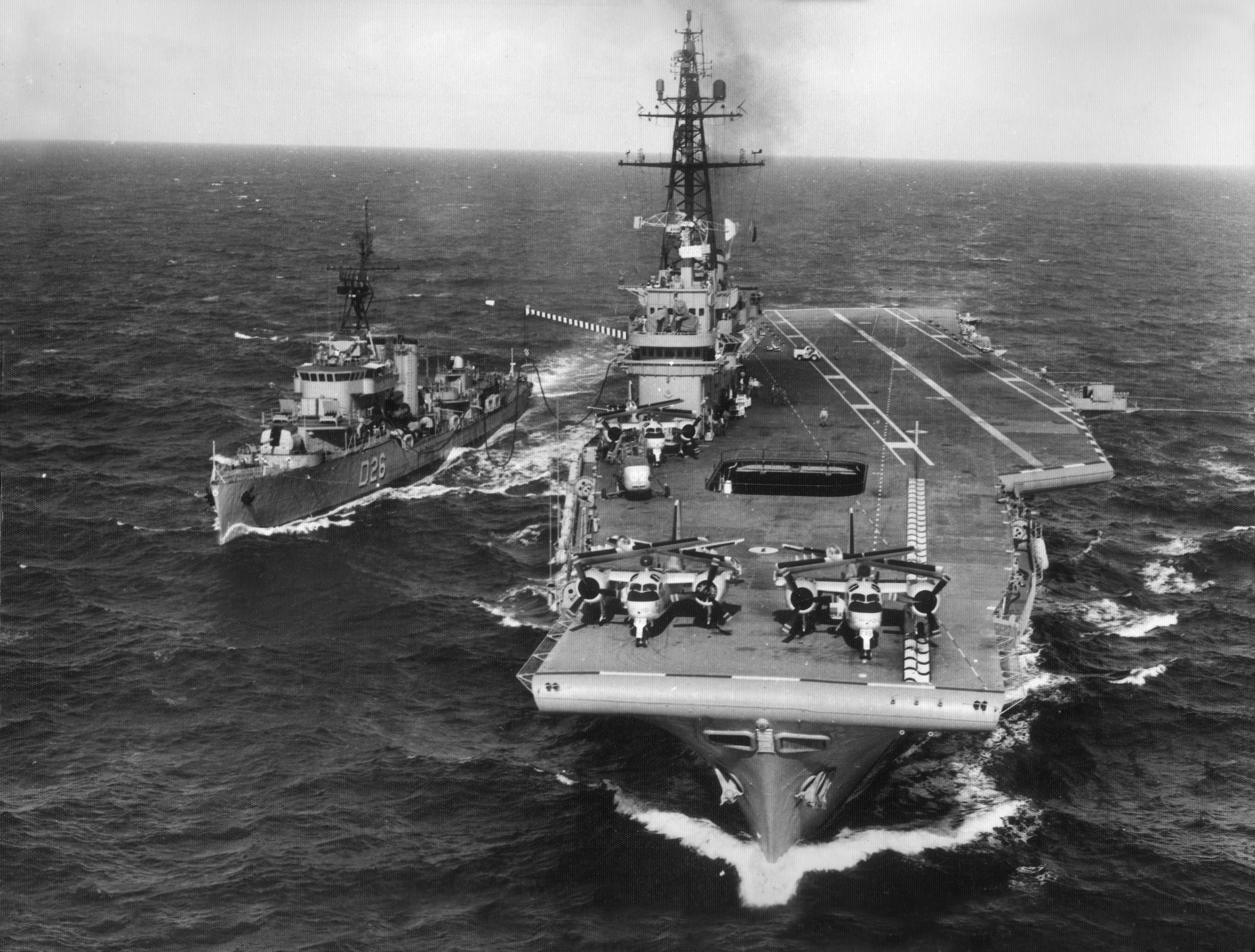
NAeL Minas Gerais was the epitome of the expansion of Brazilian Naval Aviation and the Navy as a whole in this period; in the photo, the FAB S-2 Tracker planes are on deck

On 4 August 1952, after intense negotiation with president Getúlio Vargas and Minister of Aeronautics Nero Moura, the Navy's Directorate of Aeronautics (DAerM) was created. Although sometimes cited as a moment of recreation for Naval Aviation, the Navy was still far from having pilots and aircraft. According to the military doctrine defined in the General Staff of the Armed Forces (EMFA), air support would depend on the FAB, but the Navy considered the cooperation received unsatisfactory. On 3 December 1954, the Navy created the specialty of Naval Air Observer (OAN), who would be trained at the Naval Air Training and Instruction Center (CIAAN), organized in May 1955. The role of observers would be to work on FAB aircraft, but the Navy's real purpose was to train new naval aviators. In the same year, six officers went to the United States, where they trained as helicopter pilots.

The function of the new Naval Aviation would be anti-submarine warfare. The simplest option, a land-based patrol aviation, was not politically viable, as it could already be organized by the FAB, with the argument of saving resources in its favor. The Barroso-class cruisers, acquired in 1951–1952, had the capacity to operate helicopters, but attempts to get aviation through that route were unsuccessful. The justification found was the acquisition of NAeL Minas Gerais (A-11) in 1956. For the FAB, competition with a new Naval Aviation would worsen its budget difficulties. It reacted by creating the 1st Group of Embarked Aviation (1st GAE) the following year, with Grumman S-2 Tracker planes (P-16, in the FAB) and Sikorsky HSS-1N Seabat helicopters, but the Navy did not allow them to operate aboard Minas Gerais. Consequently, Minas Gerais operated against the Legality Campaign in 1961 without embarked planes, and the 1st GAE participated in the "Lobster War" from land bases.

==== First helicopters ====
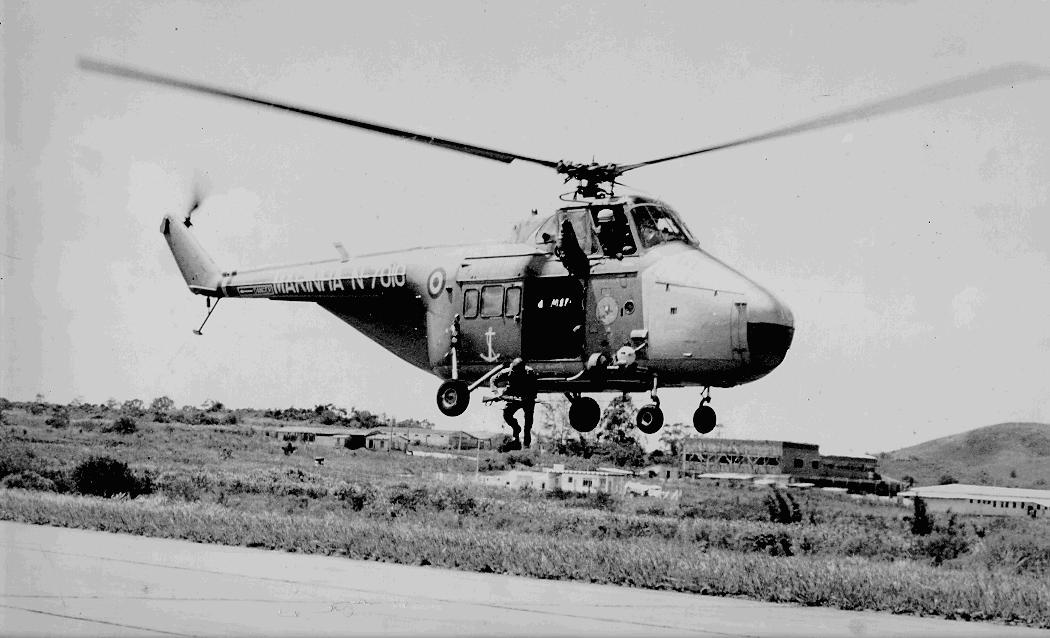
Westland Whirlwind Series 1 helicopter of the 1st General Purpose Helicopter Squadron (HU-1)

In 1958 the Navy already had a small body of pilots and qualified maintenance personnel, training them at the CIAAN (whose activities were transferred to a helipad at kilometer 11 of Avenida Brasil the previous year) and also sending officers to study abroad. Staff training followed the acquisition of air resources. In 1958 several helicopters were purchased: two Bell-Kawasaki HTL-6 (model 47G, nicknamed "Sakura"), practically organic from the hydrographic ships Sirius (H-21) and Canopus (H-22), and, for the CIAAN, three Bell HUL-1 (mod. 47J) and two Westland Widgeon (HUW). Minas Gerais arrived in Brazil in February 1961, bringing on board three Grumman TBF Avenger planes (used to train maneuvers on deck, not for flying) and three Westland Whirlwind S-55 Srs.1 helicopters and six Bell HTL-5 (mod. 47D) disassembled. The S-55s stayed with the NAeL Minas Gerais Air Detachment, and the Bell 47s with the CIAAN.

The helipad on Avenida Brasil was dangerous for air traffic due to its proximity to Galeão Airport, and a FAB plane had already collided with a commercial Viscount in 1959, requiring the decongestion of the area. In 1961 the CIAAN was transferred to São Pedro da Aldeia, a strategic location chosen for an air base, but whose works were still incomplete. This was also a political maneuver for fear that the new president Jânio Quadros would deactivate or transfer the CIAAN to the FAB. In the same year, the Navy organized the Naval Air Force, headquartered in Minas Gerais and commanded by the Commander-in-Chief of the Squadron, and the first squadrons, not yet activated: the 1st Squadron of Instruction Helicopters (HI-1), initially subordinated to the CIAAN, and the 1st Anti-submarine Aircraft Squadron (AvS-1), soon renamed the 1st Mixed Anti-submarine and Attack Aircraft Squadron (AvSAt-1). Later in 1961, the 1st General Purpose Helicopter Squadron (HU-1) and the 1st Anti-Submarine Helicopter Squadron (HS-1) were created. The following year, the purchase of six 269A, thirteen 269A1 and one 269B helicopters, the "Fleas" by Hughes, enabled the HI-1 to be activated.

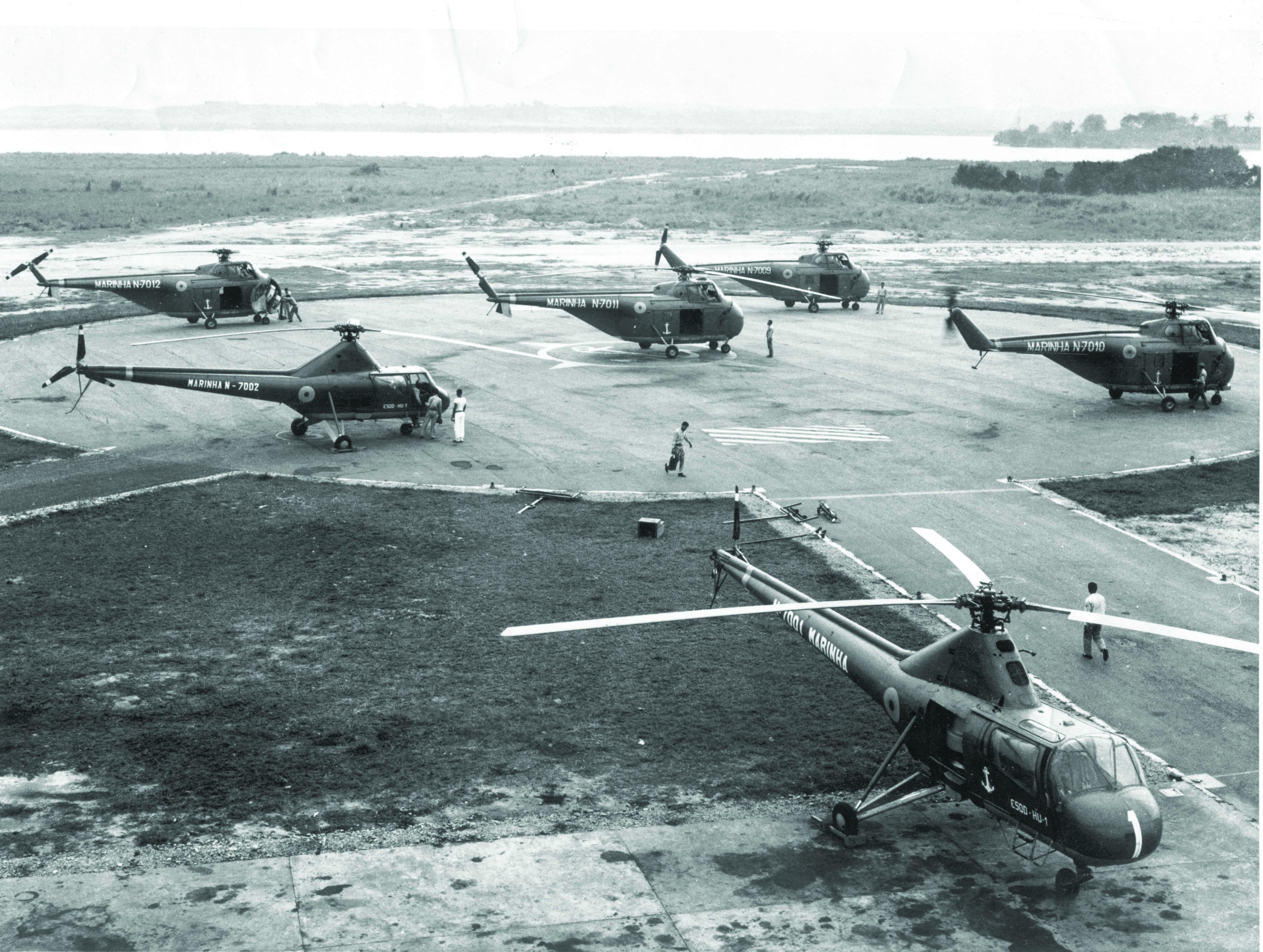
Helipad on Avenida Brasil with the Westland Widgeon and Whirlwind helicopters

The HU-1 was activated in May 1962, after two Whirlwinds seriously crashed in one day. The repair was feasible, however, not on board Minas Gerais, and it was necessary to take the aircraft to São Pedro da Aldeia. However, the two Widgeons that operated there also needed constant repairs. The squadron, headquartered in the old CIAAN hangars on Avenida Brasil and made up of three Whirlwinds from Minas Gerais and two Widgeons from CIAAN, rationalized maintenance. The risks posed by flights close to Galeão Airport continued to generate controversy in the press. The air traffic control of the Department of Civil Aviation, administered by the Ministry of Aeronautics, did not recognize Naval Aviation aircraft. The FAB insisted that the legislation guaranteed it a monopoly on aviation.

==== Fixed wing aircraft and peak of the crisis with the FAB ====
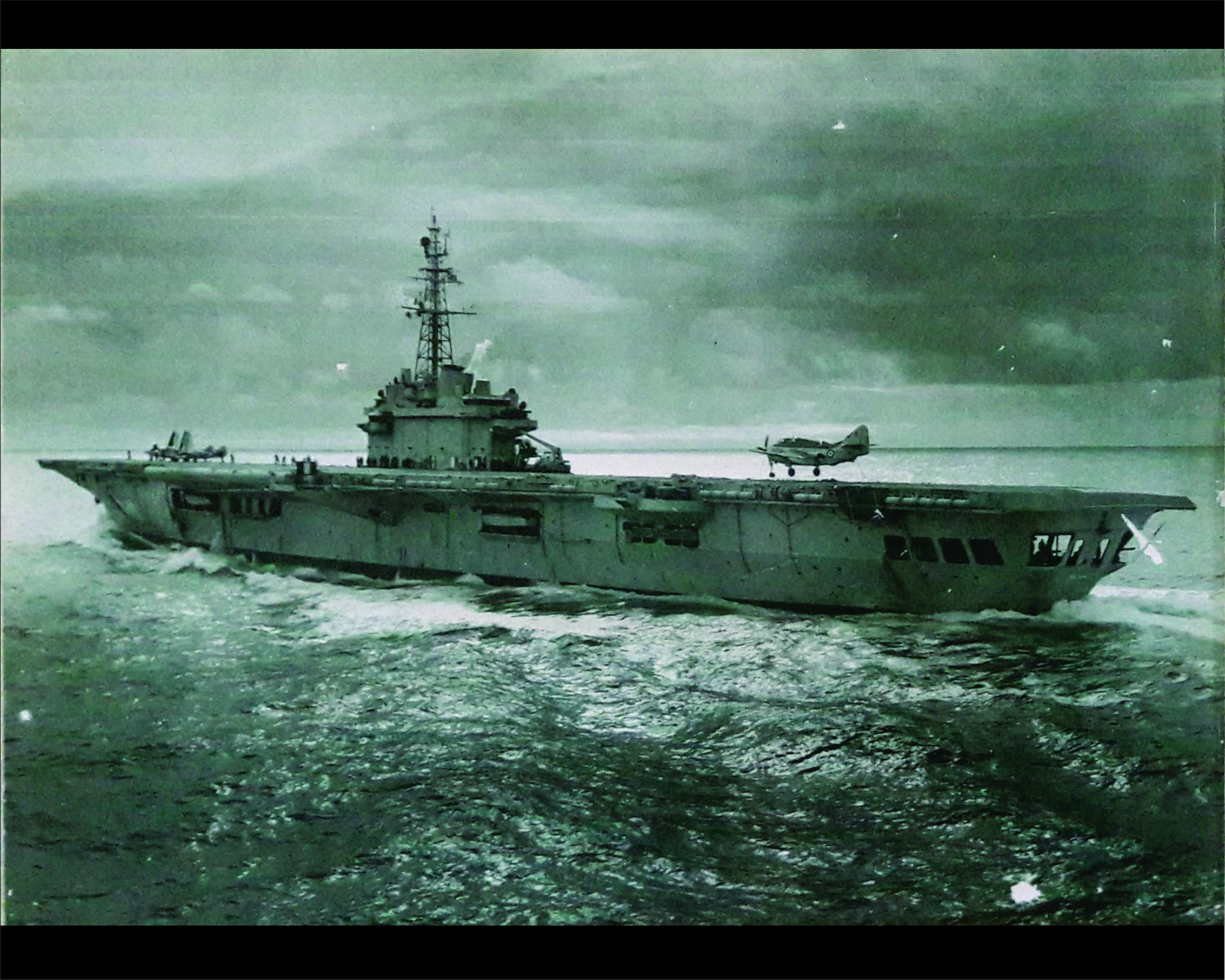
Maneuvering of a Fairey Gannet over Minas Gerais in 1960

The "Wings for the Navy" campaign received a Taylorcraft BC-12D, a Fairchild PT-26 and a Neiva P-56 Paulistinha donated in 1962 as aircraft, but they saw only limited use in instruction. There was also the design of the Niess 7-250 Frigate trainer plane, which already had a prototype almost ready in 1965. But to obtain operational planes, the Brazilian Navy had to buy, transport and assemble the aircraft in secrecy, circumventing opposition from the federal government and the FAB. Throughout 1963 the Navy received six Pilatus P.3s for the newly created 1st Instruction Air Squadron (AvI-1) and six North American T-28 Trojans for the AvSAt-1. Despite the silence, the news leaked and Naval Aviation received criminal accusations, some well founded and some not, from the press and the FAB. The climate of debate was hot, and the FAB and Navy disputed public opinion.

On 12 June of the same year, the journal Tribuna da Imprensa reported that a FAB plane was almost machine-gunned by the Navy when flying over the naval air base in São Pedro da Aldeia. This and other incidents between aircraft from both branches led president João Goulart to suspend all Navy flights. In September, the Minister of the Navy Sílvio Mota visited the base and was received with the "Revoada", a protest by naval aviators, who took off en masse; the interdiction had come to an end. The crisis reached the top echelon of the Castelo Branco government after the "Tramandaí incident" in December 1964: FAB soldiers fired at a HU-1 helicopter to prevent its takeoff, triggering a military police inquiry and the resignation of the Minister of Aeronautics Nelson Lavanére-Wanderley. Soon after, Minas Gerais entered Guanabara Bay with the T-28s on deck for the first time. When the Navy refused to withdraw the planes, the next Air Force Minister, Márcio de Sousa Melo, also resigned. For the government, the need for a solution was already clear.

The solution was the "Castelo Branco corollary", allowing the Navy to have a Naval Aviation with helicopters, but reserving the monopoly of fixed wing aircraft to the FAB. The decision reflected the direction of the Army within the Armed Forces and the need for the military dictatorship to avoid intermilitary conflict. The planes remained with the FAB due to the technological superiority of its P-16 Trackers to the Navy's incipient fixed-wing aviation. As a result of the agreement, Naval Aviation delivered 27 aircraft to the FAB, most of which saw little use, and received the six helicopters from the 1st GAE. The outcome was not fully satisfactory to the FAB, much less to the Navy. Bilateral rivalry continued. Navy Minister Ernesto de Melo Batista asked for his resignation and no active-duty admiral accepted to take his place; his successor was Paulo Bosísio, a reserve admiral. The two branches remained distant, and later the Navy would resume its ambition to operate airplanes.

=== Third phase ===
==== Reorganization until 1971 ====
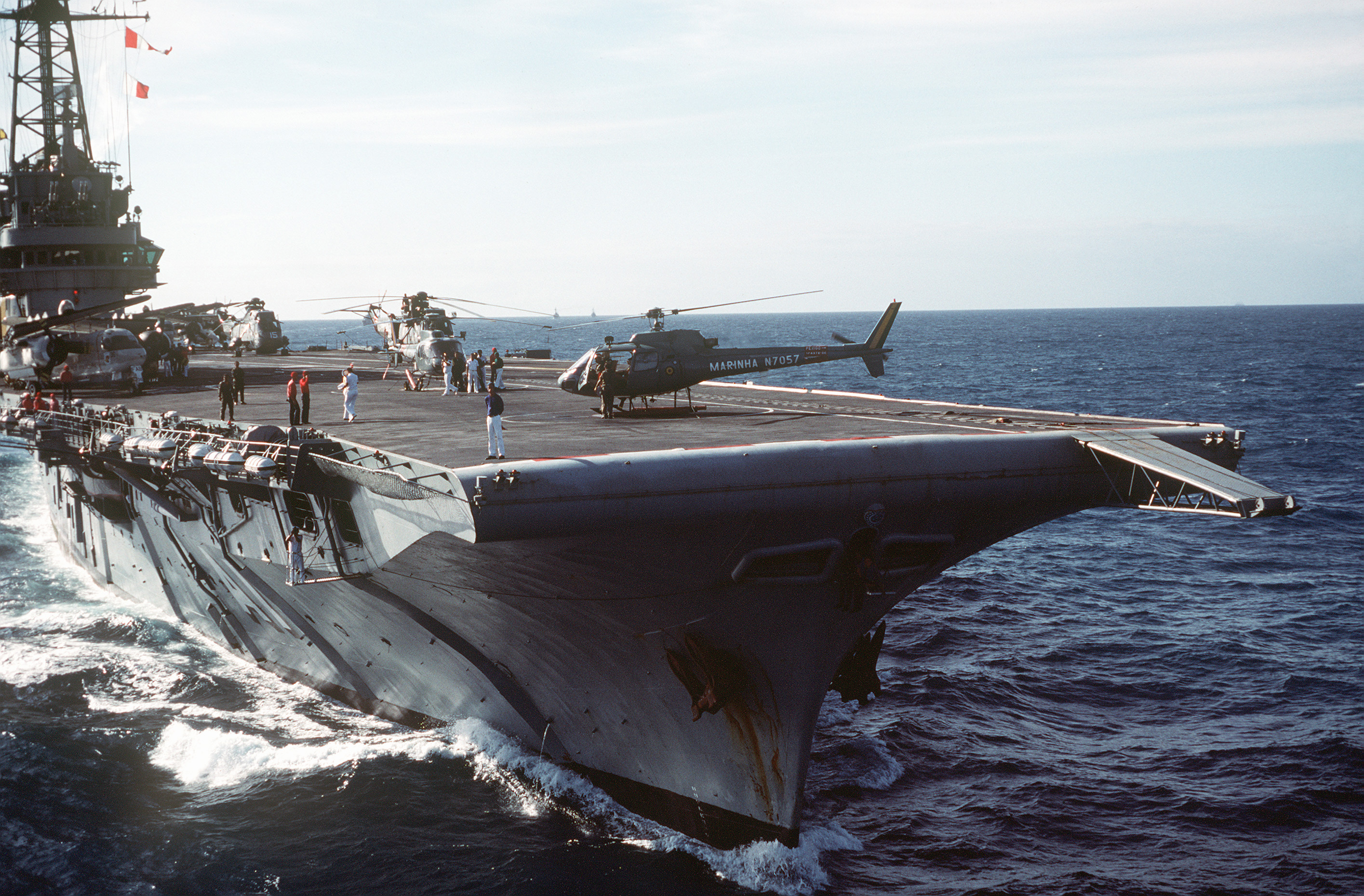
In 1984, both FAB planes and Navy helicopters served in Minas Gerais

Decree No. 55,627, of 26 January 1965, was the landmark of the third phase of Brazilian Naval Aviation, ending the uproar with the Air Force. The command of Minas Gerais and its helicopters was under the Navy, while the planes would be commanded in tune with the Navy, but operated by the FAB. During 1965, the Naval Air Force had its name changed from Força Aérea Naval to Força Aeronaval (FORAERNAV), subordinated to the Commander-in-Chief of the Navy. In 1966, the fiftieth anniversary of Naval Aviation, the São Pedro da Aldeia Naval Air Base (BAeNSPA) was officially created. FORAERNAV was composed of Minas Gerais, the 1st Anti-submarine Helicopter Group (GP HS-1), 1st Anti-submarine Helicopter Squadron (EsqdHS-1) (Note: Falconi 2009 also mentions the 2nd squadron, but according to FGV Projetos 2016, p. 104, it never got off the ground.) and the 1st General Employment Helicopter Squadron (EsqdHU-1), in addition to land establishments. HI-1 remained under the CIAAN. The helipad on Avenida Brasil no longer hosted units.

The EsqdHS-1 used the six SH-34J anti-submarine helicopters received from the FAB. Nicknamed "Whales", their more complex electronic equipment represented a technological advance, but sonar was still considered weak. The Navy acquired new helicopters, but they were second hand and of the penultimate generation, such as the Westland UH-2 Wasp, five turbine UH-5 Whirlwind Series 2 and six Fairchild-Hiller UH-4 (FH-1100), all destined for the HU-1 between 1965 and 1970. There were attempts, with no results, to get an Embraer helicopter together with the FAB.

The development of Naval Aviation followed the international scenario, the government's economic and strategic situation and the secondary position of the Navy within the Armed Forces. The aeronautical sector was better integrated into the administrative scheme of the Ministry of the Navy in the DAerM regulation of 1970. This directorate was subordinated to the Director General of Material of the Navy and gradually became responsible only for material, flight safety and political affairs. The CIAAN was linked to the Navy Education Directorate and, in the following year, detached from DAerM. CIANN and HI-1 ceased to have a hierarchical relationship and were both subordinate to FORAERNAV; thus, the CIAAN was left with only the academic part of the training of the personnel. Minas Gerais ceased to be part of FORAERNAV, becoming subordinate to the Commander-in-Chief of the Navy.

==== Expansion of the fleet ====
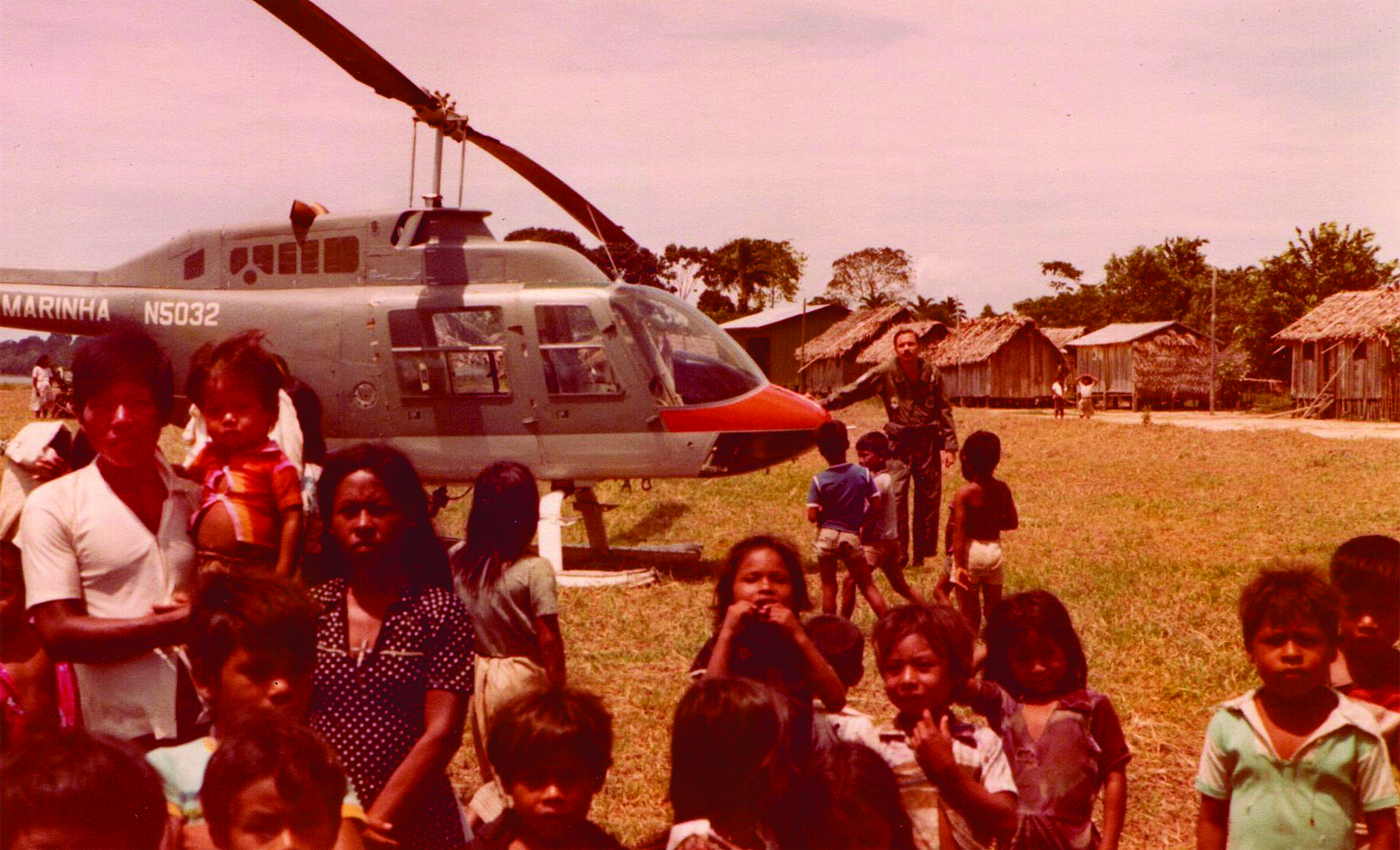
Hospital assistance provided by the Air Detachment of the Amazon Flotilla in 1982

The anti-submarine helicopters were of relative quality, maintained by the purchase of six Sikorsky SH-3 Sea Kings for the HS-1 in 1970, but their numbers were limited. Ten more SH-3s would be purchased in the future, while the older SH-34Js were retired in 1975. The HI-1 "Fleas" were retired in 1974 and replaced by the Bell IH-6 Jet Ranger. Another anti-submarine acquisition was nine Westland Lynx helicopters to accompany the new Niterói-class frigates, allowing for the creation of the 1st Attack Helicopter Squadron (HA-1) in 1978. For general use, the small Esquilo helicopters began to be received in 1979. Successive acquisitions made it one of the most numerous aircraft of the Brazilian Navy, which uses two models, the UH-12 (single engine) and UH-13 (twin engine). Esquilos are manufactured in Brazil under French license, thanks to the expansion of the country's helicopter industry and the civilian and military demand verified at that time.

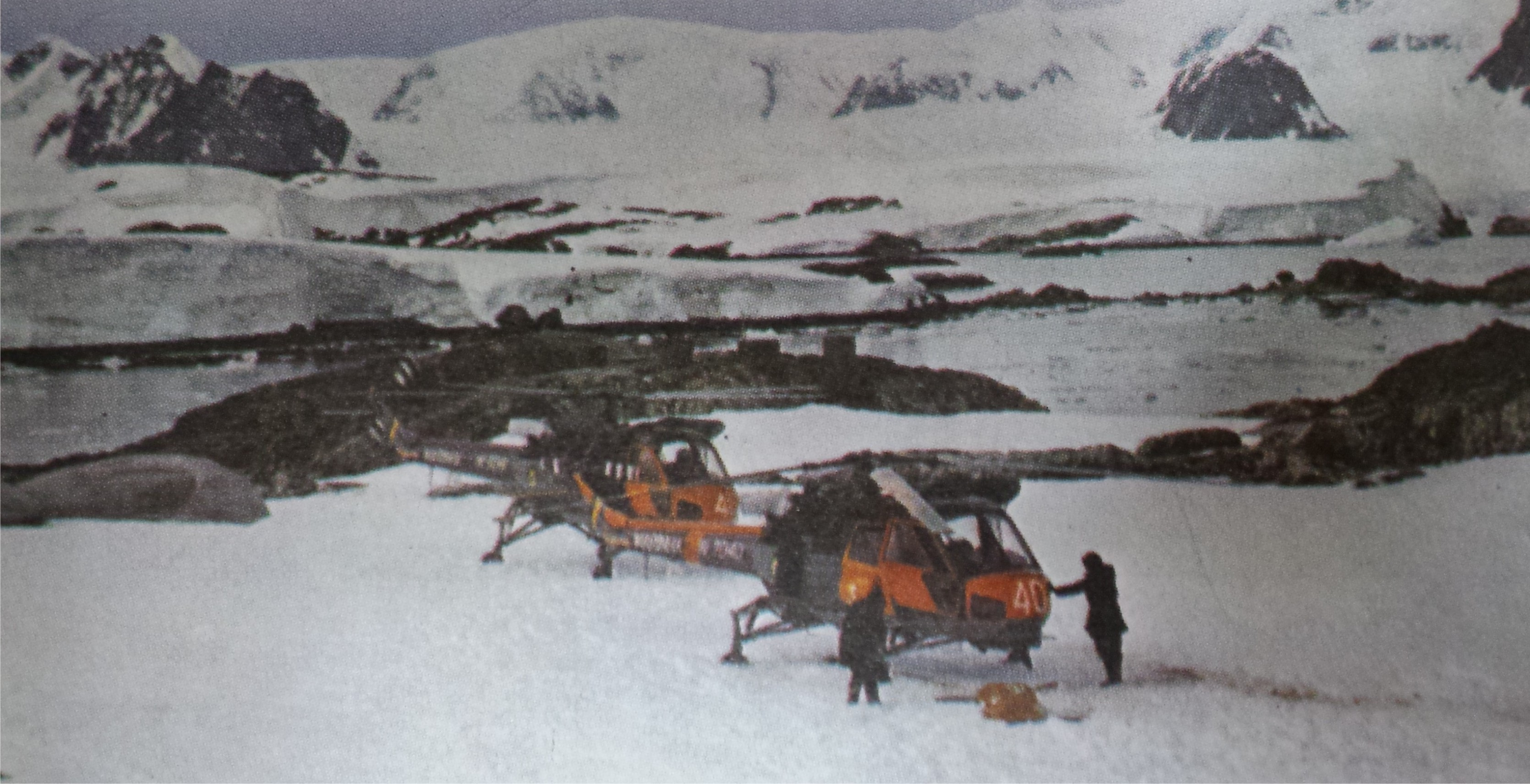
First UH-2 Wasp landing in Antarctica

The progressive expansion of Naval Aviation outside Rio de Janeiro, where BAeNSPA was located, the only authorized base, began with the Embarked Air Detachment of the Amazon Flotilla, in 1979. During this period, Naval Aviation participated in the UNITAS international military exercises, and the HU-1 participated in the Brazilian Antarctic Program from 1982 onwards. The UH-14 Super Puma, acquired due to the limited load capacity of the UH-12 Esquilo, were used to organize the 2nd General Purpose Helicopter Squadron (HU-2) in 1986. In the 1980s, the Navy began to have more ships capable of operating helicopters, integrating them more into the fleet. Even so, the Falklands War, in 1982, left the Armed Forces, including the Navy, in a feeling of impotence for a war in the South Atlantic. In the years immediately after the war, the number of articles on Naval Aviation declined in the Revista Marítima Brasileira.

=== Fourth phase ===
==== Return of fixed wing aircraft ====
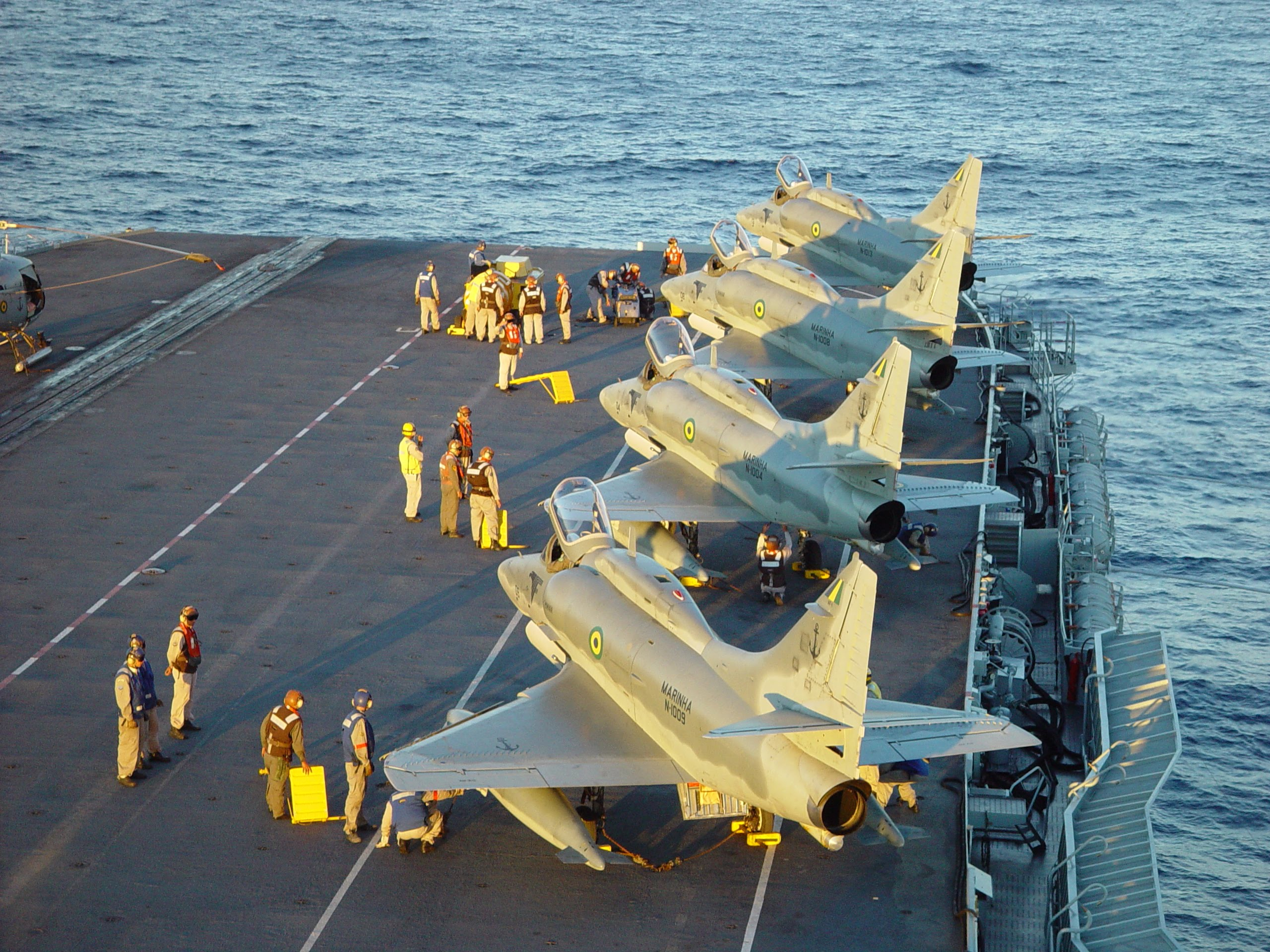
Four Skyhawk fighters on the flight deck of NAe São Paulo in 2003

The Falklands War showed the importance of on-board aviation for the fleet's air defense. Consequently, in 1983 the Minister of the Navy Maximiano Eduardo da Silva Fonseca presented an explanatory statement for the purchase of twelve aircraft to president João Figueiredo, and a naval version of the AMX A-1, developed by Alenia, Aermacchi and Embraer, it was announced, but canceled in 1985. The next decade brought new arguments for the return of fixed-wing aircraft to the Navy: the performance of naval forces in exercises, the participation of Marines in operations abroad, the end of the Cold War and the fear of submarines in the Soviet Navy called into question the anti-submarine focus hitherto adopted for the aircraft carrier. The retirement of the Air Force's P-16 Trackers opened up an opportunity. The FAB still defended its monopoly on fixed wings, but it was going through a serious crisis and was busy with other projects.

Pilots from the Brazilian Navy went to Argentina and Uruguay to train on planes in 1994, and Kuwait's A-4 Skyhawk aircraft were chosen to proceed with the purchase. It was an "opportunity purchase": the Kuwaiti Skyhawks had few hours of use and good condition. The model is robust and has a long history on aircraft carriers, but is not ideal for its intended air defense role as it is subsonic and designed for air support; interceptors and AEW aircraft could have been a better fit for the mission.

Navy Minister Mauro César Rodrigues Pereira managed to overcome resistance from the FAB, the Army and the economic area of the Fernando Henrique Cardoso government, in addition to Argentina's suspicions. With presidential Decree No. 2,538, of 8 April 1998, the Navy regained the right to operate its own fixed-wing aircraft from its vessels. In this way, the president tried to appease the concerns of the Navy, whose political influence within the Armed Forces was smaller. The purchase proceeded, despite the heavy investment required and the risks posed by other strategic Navy projects. In 1999, twenty A-4KU Skyhawks were purchased, for one crew member, and three TA-4KU training aircraft, for two crew members, for US$70 million. They formed the 1st Intercept and Attack Aircraft Squadron (VF-1). Large investments in supporting infrastructure were also required.

The VF-1 squadron even operated from Minas Gerais, but its deck was too limited for the Skyhawks and they would have difficulties in landing, forcing the aircraft carrier to operate close to the coast. Shortly after its last modernization, Minas Gerais was replaced by the French aircraft carrier Foch, acquired in 2000 and designated NAe São Paulo. It was still a used ship, but more recent and with a better capacity for launching and landing fighters than Minas Gerais. The new aircraft carrier and the VF-1 were celebrated as the evolution to a blue-water navy.

==== Maintenance in other areas ====
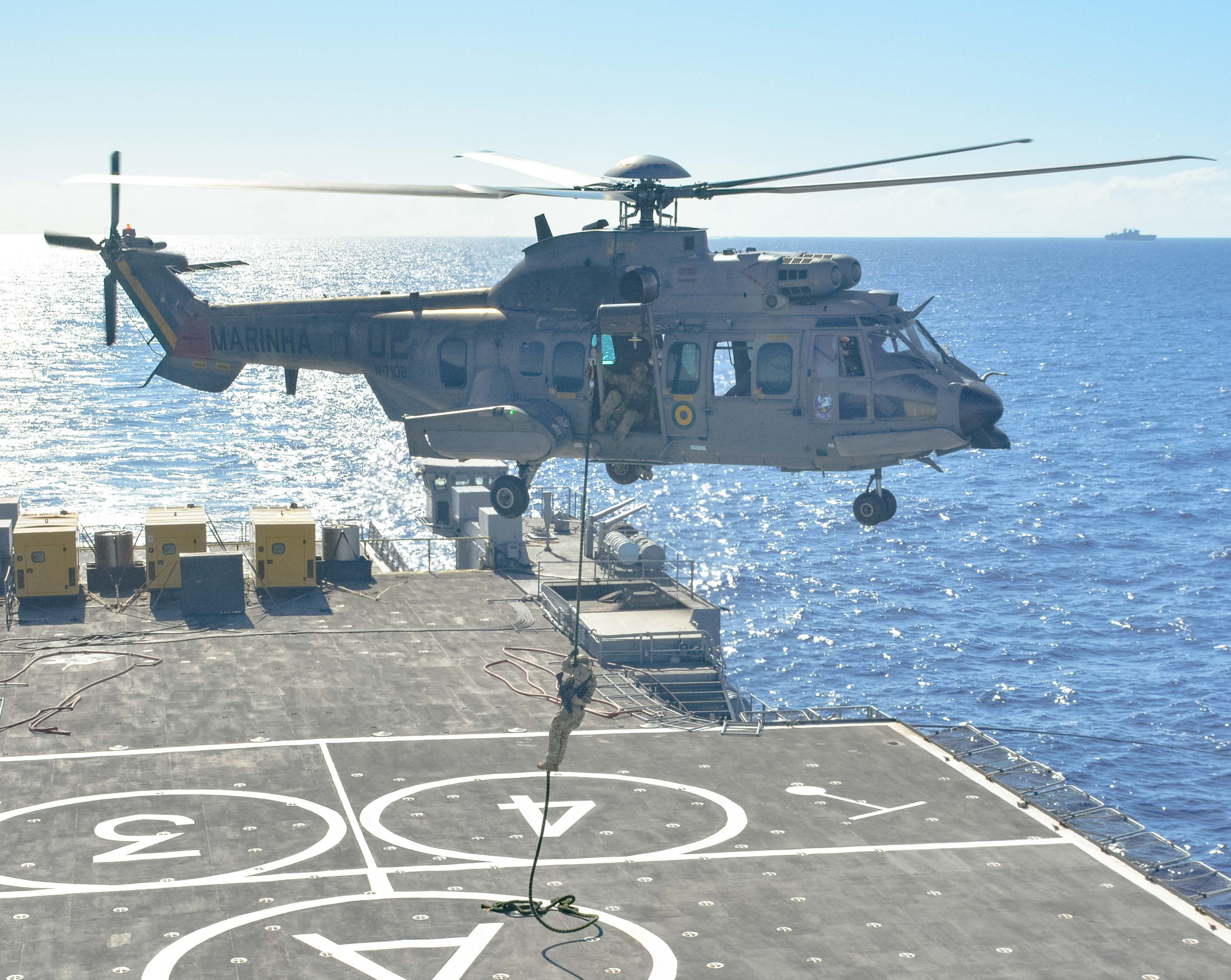
EC-725 Super Cougar training with GRUMEC in NDM Bahia in 2022

In the new phase of Naval Aviation, the old rotorcraft sector remained the most historically consolidated, with its broad administrative and operational structure and less dependence on imported technology. Helicopter acquisitions and upgrades continued, and at the end of this phase, in 2022, Naval Aviation remained consisting mostly of helicopters.

The HA-1 had its Lynx upgraded to the Super Lynx version from 1996 onwards, and consequently changed its name to 1st Squadron of Clarification and Attack Helicopters. In 2012, the HS-1 retired its SH-3A/B Sea King, which had already served for over forty years, and incorporated the first four helicopters of its successor, the MH-16 Seahawk, with state-of-the-art avionics and sensors. The HU-2 began receiving the EC-725 Super Cougar in 2011. They are a step towards interoperability with the FAB and the Brazilian Army Aviation, which use the same aircraft, and represent the best anti-surface warfare capability of Naval Aviation.

The UH-12 and UH-13 Esquilo, with constant shipments and long service histories, already suffered from a high rate of failures in the 2010s. The estimated fleet was 19 UH-12s and 8 UH-12s in 2020. To renew it, three Eurocopter H-135 (UH-17) were ordered in 2019, and 15 new Esquilos in 2022.

The Naval Aviation Museum was created in 2000 to concentrate representative elements of all five phases of the development of Naval Aviation in Brazil, including a collection of aircraft, in addition to memorials to the soldiers killed while carrying out missions across the country. The purpose of this museum is "to rescue and preserve the memory of aviation in the Navy, as well as to reach civil society, in order to spread the history of Naval Aviation to future generations."

==== Issues with the Skyhawk (AF-1) ====
A shortcoming in São Paulo's air defense was the lack of early warning aircraft to complement the AF-1 jets, reducing their reaction time as interceptors by up to four times. This made the squadron vulnerable to anti-ship missiles launched by low-flying enemy planes and helicopters, such as the Exocet that hit British ships in the Falklands War. To complete the on-board aviation, the idea was to create the 1st Squadron of Transport Planes and Early Air Warning (VEC-1, or even, VR-1). The acquisition of four Grumman S-2 Tracker cells in Australia, the same old FAB model in Minas Gerais, was foreseen, but did not reach a contract; (Note: The Revista Asas magazine reported on 23 July 2021 the retirement of the last Tracker in service in the world, in Argentina, and mentioned Brazil only in the context of Trader.) they would have been modernized to serve in early air warning. Another S-2 from Uruguay would be used as a parts source. Four C-1 Traders, another version of the Tracker, would be upgraded to the KC-2 Turbo Trader standard, refueling the AF-1s in flight and transporting material and equipment between the land base and the aircraft carrier. The forecast for the first delivery was in 2021, but the schedule was not met and that year the Turbo Traders were still undergoing modernization in the Marsh Aviation hangars, in the United States. The program was canceled in 2023.

Old and difficult to replace parts, Skyhawk jets suffered from high unavailability and were gradually lost. Of the 23 originally acquired, only three to four were operated daily in 2017. They only took off about six hundred times from São Paulo, which spent long periods undergoing refurbishment and repairs. The Navy decided to decommission the aircraft carrier, at the time the oldest in service in the world, in 2017, leaving only two navies in the world (American and French) with CATOBAR launch aircraft carriers. The Skyhawks, which had been undergoing a significant modernization program since 2009, were stuck on land bases, and their future was in limbo. The only way to train pilots on aircraft carriers is to collaborate with the American or French navies. If this proficiency is not maintained, fixed-wing aircraft will lose their naval character, jeopardizing their very existence. The Navy keeps the jets after the loss of São Paulo, waiting for better days. In 2020, they were expected to serve until 2030. The fate of this sector of Naval Aviation was one of the arguments used by FAB brigadiers against the acquisition of fixed-wing aircraft by the Army in 2020.

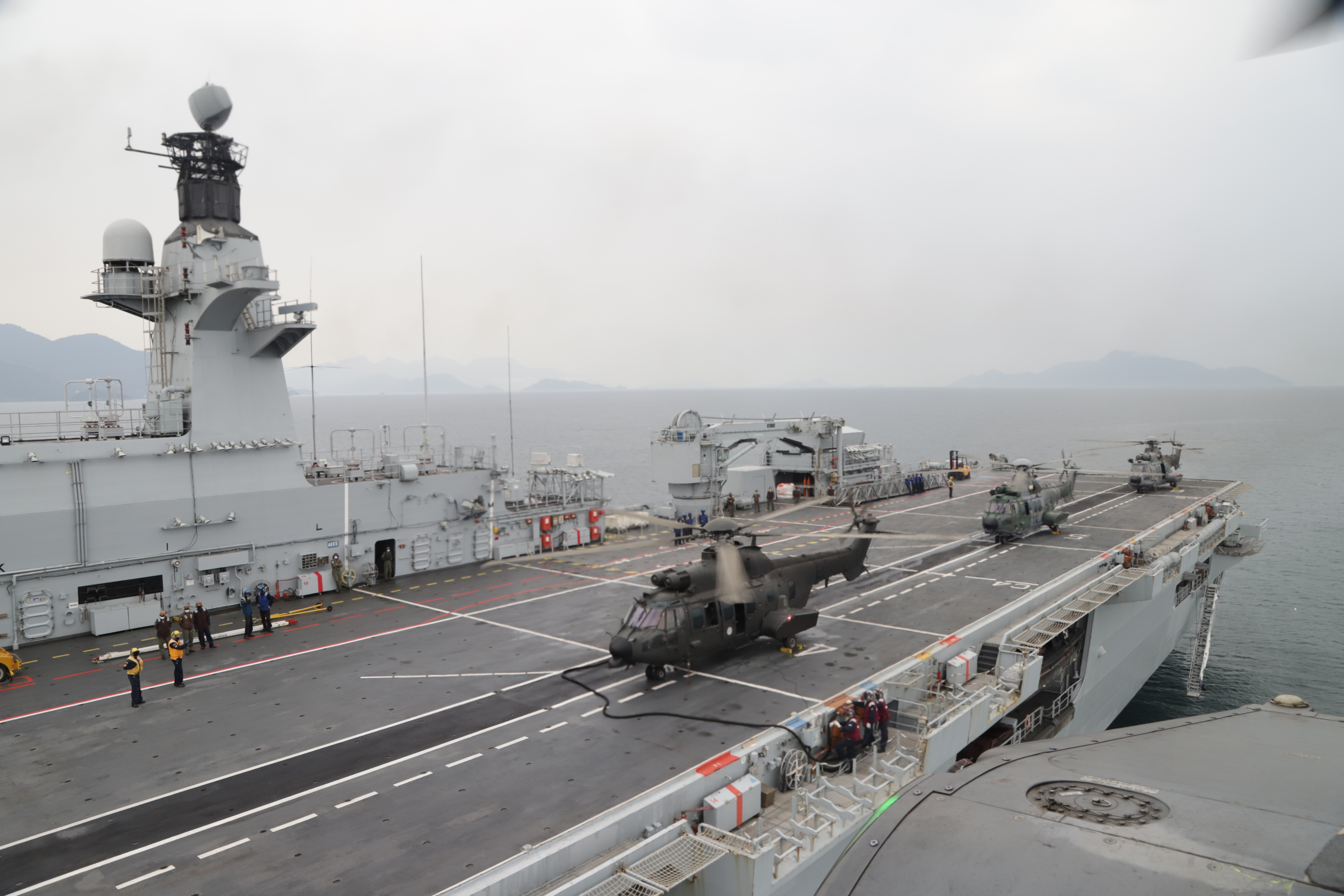
Super Cougar helicopters on the deck of NAM Atlântico in 2020

There were plans for a fleet of two aircraft carriers, replacing São Paulo by 2028, and four LHD-type helicopter carriers. The 2013 Brazilian Navy Articulation and Equipment Plan (PAEMB) provided for a future fleet of 72 aircraft (48 for intercept and attack and 24 for AEW, COD, REVO and maritime surveillance) and 206 helicopters. However, budgetary reality fell far short of these ambitions. Plans to acquire a new aircraft carrier and a naval version of the Saab Gripen were unlikely to materialize at the time of decommissioning the São Paulo, given the country's economic crisis. For the Navy, fixed-wing aviation is of lower priority than the nuclear submarine and corvettes.

São Paulo was compensated in part by the helicopter carrier Atlântico, purchased from the British Royal Navy in 2018. The EC725 Caracal, S-70B Seahawk and AS350 Esquilo helicopters continue to operate from its deck, with capacity for six aircraft, and hangar, with capacity for eighteen. In 2020 Atlântico was renamed from a "Multipurpose Helicopter Carrier" (Porta-Helicópteros Multipropósito, PHM) to "Multipurpose Aircraft Ship" (Navio-Aeródromo Multipropósito, NAM), and the Navy, in theory, once again had an aircraft carrier. Atlântico can operate tiltrotor turboprop vertical landing aircraft, which the Navy does not have, and Remotely Piloted Aircraft.

=== Fifth phase ===
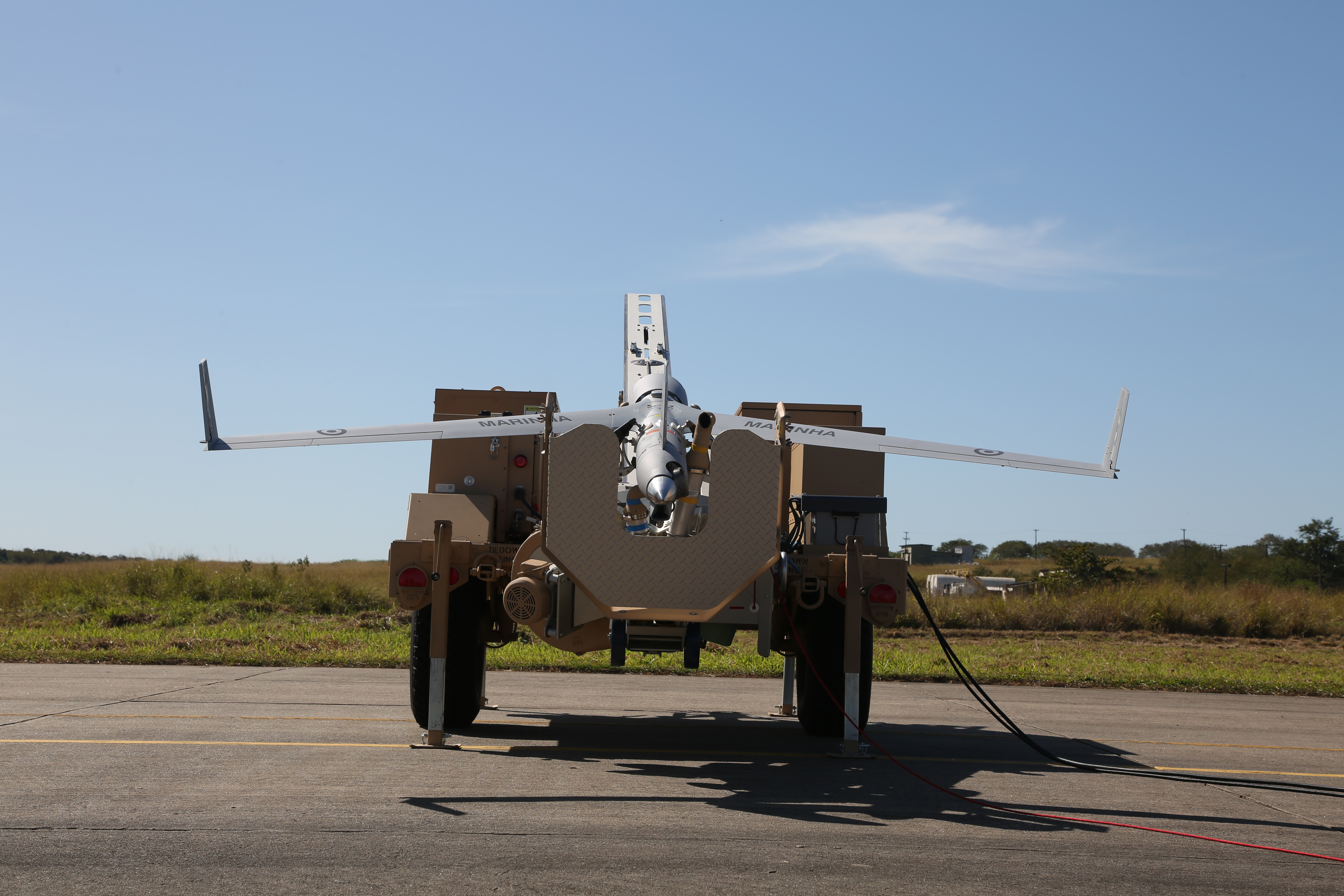
Demonstration of ScanEagle in 2022

The year 2022 marked the beginning of the so-called fifth phase of Brazilian Naval Aviation. That year, the 1st Squadron of Remotely Piloted Aircraft (1.° Esquadrão de Aeronaves Remotamente Pilotadas, EsqdQE-1) was inaugurated, which enables new developments in the field of intelligence, surveillance and monitoring of certain targets. Unmanned remotely piloted aircraft save on weight that would otherwise be occupied by a crew, allowing for a greater radius of action and payload. This squadron has six models of ScanEagle aircraft, in addition to launchers and collectors for land and on-board operation that can operate both in the afternoon and at night, in naval traffic control activities, naval inspection, crime prevention, piracy, terrorism, monitoring of disasters and rescue operation and protection of human life at sea. Night vision goggles also began to be used. Finally, in April of the same year, the modernization of five AF-1B and two AF-1C fighters was completed, with a graduation ceremony with the participation of four AF-1 fighters in July, followed by the participation of these aircraft in Operation Formosa 2022.

== Structure ==
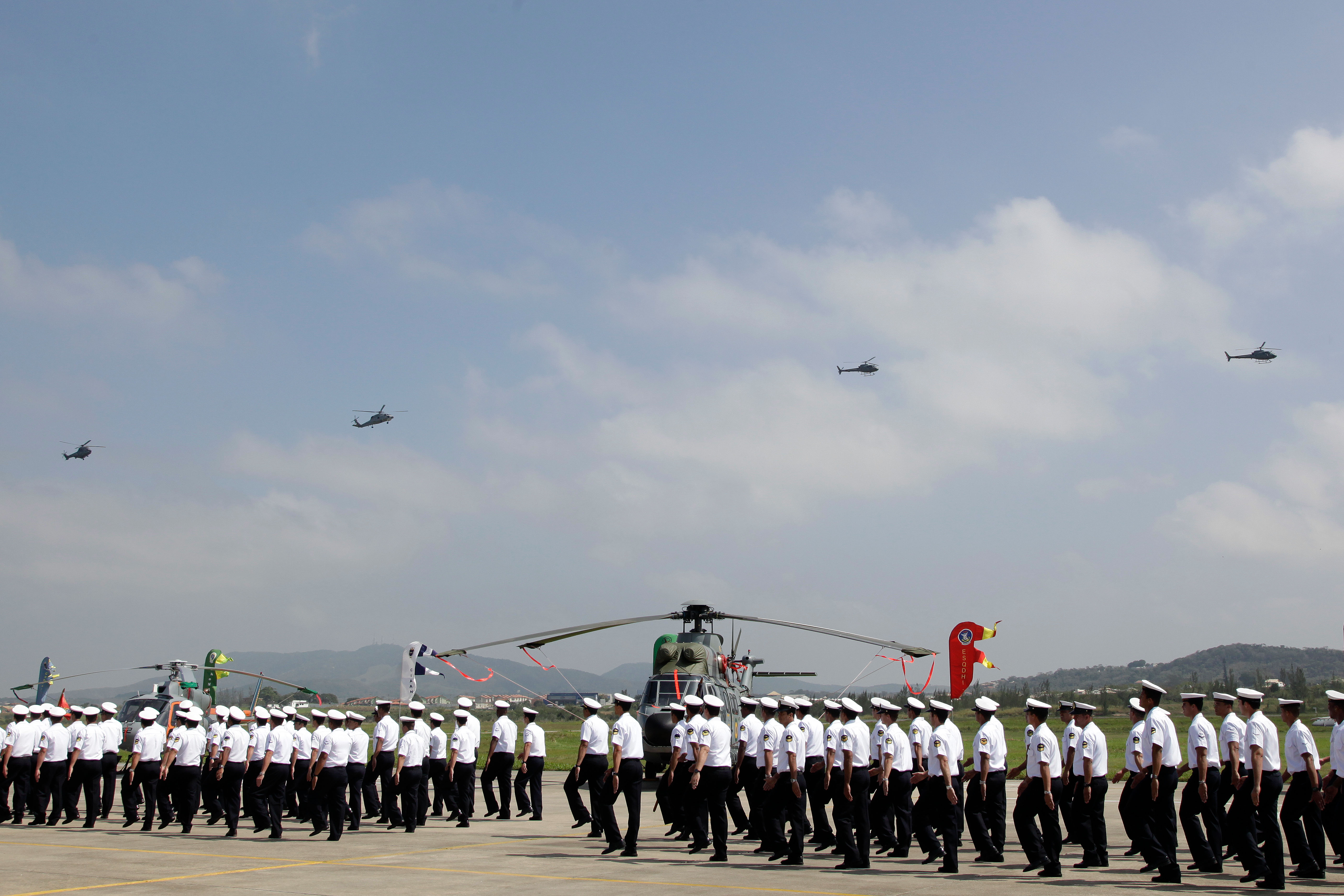
Naval Aviation Anniversary Ceremony at BAeNSPA

The combat forces of the Brazilian Navy under the command of the Naval Operations Command are divided into an oceanic component (called the Squadron) and a territorial component (the nine Naval Districts). This division is also present in the Brazilian Naval Aviation, which includes the Naval Air Force Command (ComForAerNav), the district squadrons and the Navy's Directorate of Aeronautics, responsible for normative, technical and managerial activities, without its own air resources. The core component is ComForAerNav, which is part of the Squadron, along with the Submarine Force Command, Surface Force Command (Comando da Força de Superfície, ComForSup), the 1st and 2nd Squadron Division Commands, and various supporting organizations. At sea, there is no direct aircraft-ship relationship: for each maritime operation, the Fleet Command-in-Chief (Comando-Em-Chefe da Esquadra, ComemCh) requests aircraft from ComForAerNav and ships from ComForSup.

In addition to the combat forces, ComForAerNav has subordinates to the Navy Quartermaster Center in São Pedro da Aldeia, the Naval Air Base of São Pedro da Aldeia, the Naval Polyclinic of São Pedro da Aldeia, the Naval Air Maintenance Group and CIAAN. Squadron acronyms are similar to U.S. naval aviation practice, with a first letter, such as V (airplane) or H (helicopter), for the type of vehicle, a second for its mission, such as U for utility, and a number of identification. (Note: The similarity was noted for the VF-1 by Winchester, Jim (2005). "4". Douglas A-4 Skyhawk: Attack & Close-Support Fighter Bomber. Pen and Sword.. The American nomenclature is explained in Evans, Mark L.; Grossnick, Roy A. (2015). "Squadron designations and abbreviations". United States Naval Aviation 1910-2010 vol. II: Statistics. Washington: Naval History and Heritage Command..)

=== ComForAerNav Squadrons ===
==== EsqdVF-1 ====
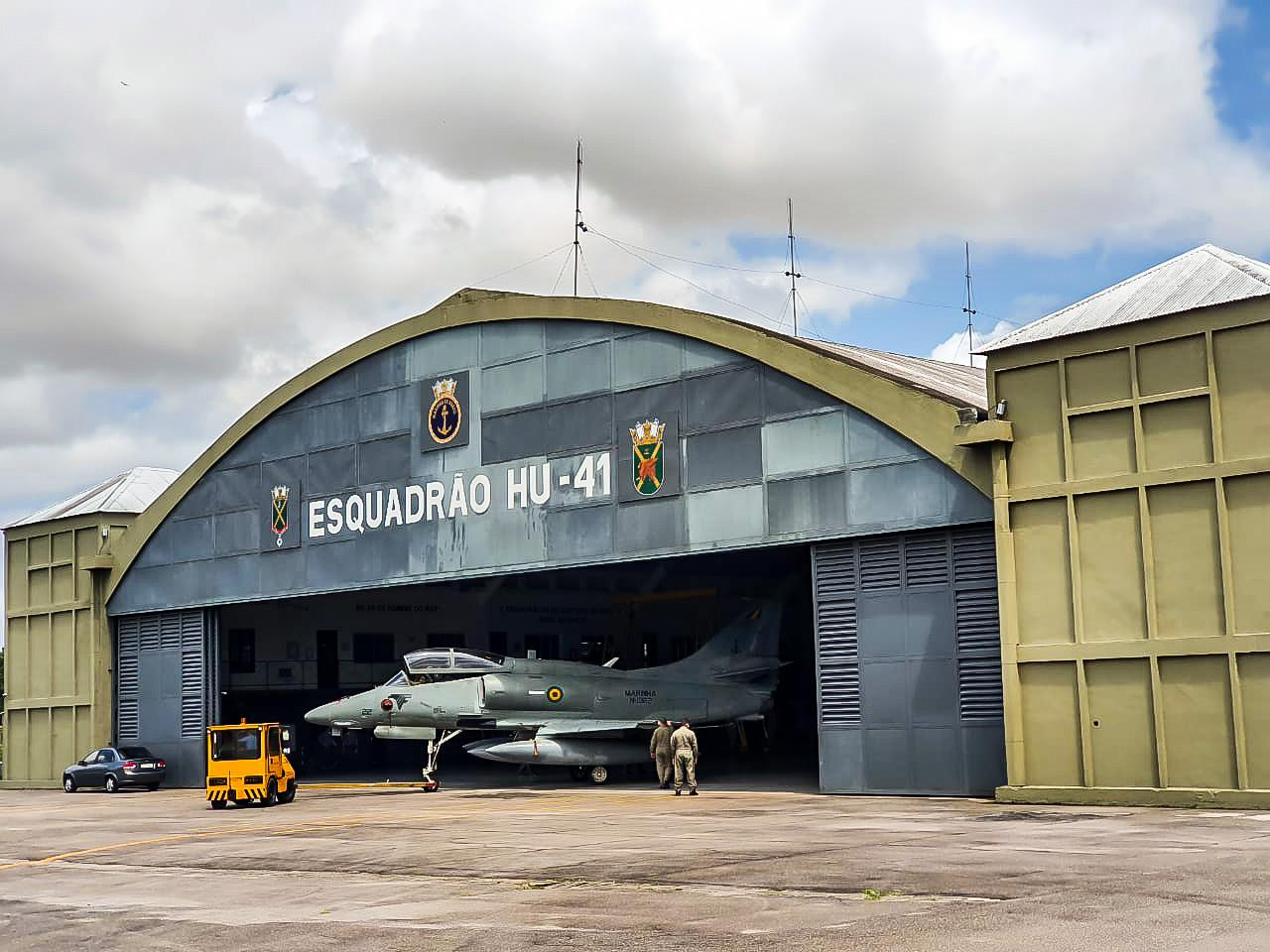
Land hangar used by a Skyhawk in 2020

The 1st Interceptor and Strike Fighter Squadron (1.º Esquadrão de Aviões de Interceptação e Ataque, EsqdVF-1), created by Ministerial Ordinance No. 256, of 2 October 1998, and activated on the same date, is responsible for the A-4 Skyhawk fighters. As of 2022 there are only six pilots in service, with five AF-1B (single seat) and two AF-1C (two seat), from an original batch of twenty AF-1 (single seat) and three AF-1A (two seat) aircraft.

==== EsqdHA-1 ====
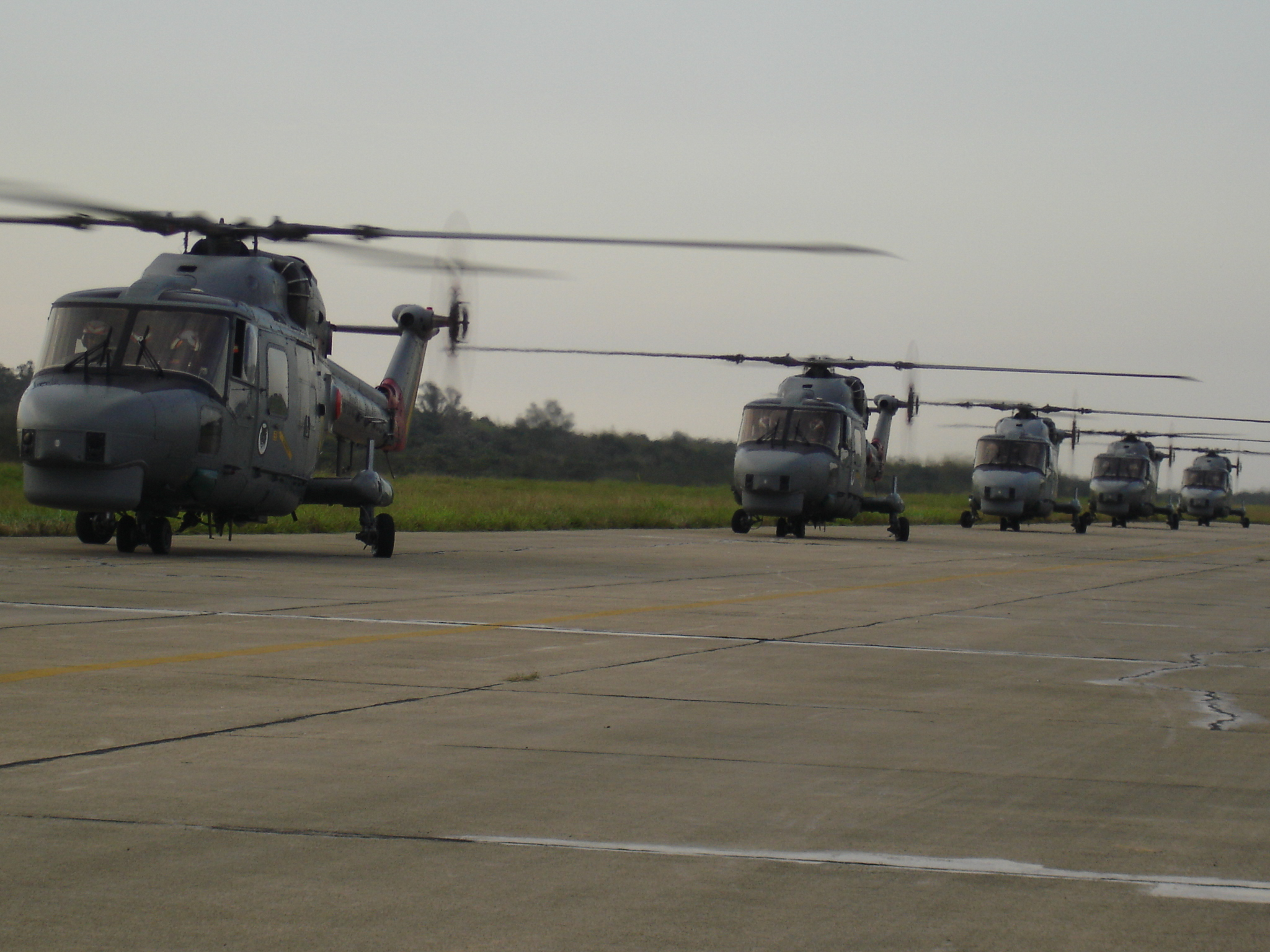
AH-11A Super Lynx in 2007

Officially activated on 17 January 1979 as the 1st Squadron of Attack Helicopters (1.º Esquadrão de Helicópteros de Ataque, EsqdHA-1), its mission is to provide the aerial means that integrate the weapons system of the Navy's surface ships, in order to expand the possibilities of the onboard sensors and the responsiveness of ships. It originally had nine Westland Sea Lynx Mk-21 (SAH-11) aircraft. The original idea was that after detecting an opposing submarine, the helicopters could engage it directly with torpedoes and depth charges or indicate the target to the IKARA missiles of the Niterói-class frigates, whose maximum range (20 km) was greater than the sonar range of the ship, requiring coordination with another platform. In the late 1980s, the Lynx were equipped with MBDA Sea Skua air-to-surface missiles to also attack surface targets. The Sea Skua is suited for attacking small vessels such as patrol boats rather than larger vessels such as a frigate.

Of the nine original Lynx, five remain, which were modernized from 1996 to the Mk21A (Super Lynx) standard, joining nine others new from the factory. They were given the new designation of the AH-11A, and the unit the name 1st Squadron of Clarification and Attack Helicopters (1.º Esquadrão de Helicópteros de Esclarecimento e Ataque), reflecting their new capabilities. As of 2019, the Super Lynx were upgraded to the Mk21B (AH-11B) standard, nicknamed "WildLynx" for its resemblance to the Wildcat, the latest version of the Super Lynx. They have systems and equipment for operation under any weather conditions, with autonomous navigation, and over the sea at night. Possible operating armaments are up to four Sea Skua missiles, two Mk 46 torpedoes, and two depth charges. The last flight of the AH-11A was in November 2019. As of September 2022, four AH-11Bs have been delivered, with another four undergoing modernization.

==== EsqdHI-1 ====
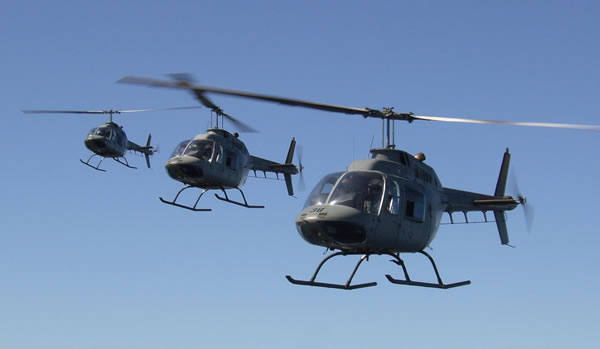
IH-6B for training

The 1st Instruction Helicopter Squadron (1.º Esquadrão de Helicópteros de Instrução, EsqdHI-1), activated on 27 June 1962, provides aircraft for the practical instruction of future pilots, advancing the theoretical teaching of CIAAN. In addition to naval aviators, CIAAN and HI-1 also train Brazilian military police and firefighter pilots, navy officers from other countries and, historically, the first pilots of the new Brazilian Army Aviation (post-1986). In addition to instruction, the squadron can also be used for general employment. It operates Bell Jet Ranger III (IH-6B) small helicopters; sixteen units have been acquired since 1986. In the 2010s they already suffered high unavailability due to long years of heavy use; at least five Helibras Esquilos, negotiated in 2022, will be their successors. As the FAB will receive the same helicopters through this program, called TH-X, the standardization of teaching aircraft could allow a joint flight instruction center in the future.

==== EsqdHS-1 ====
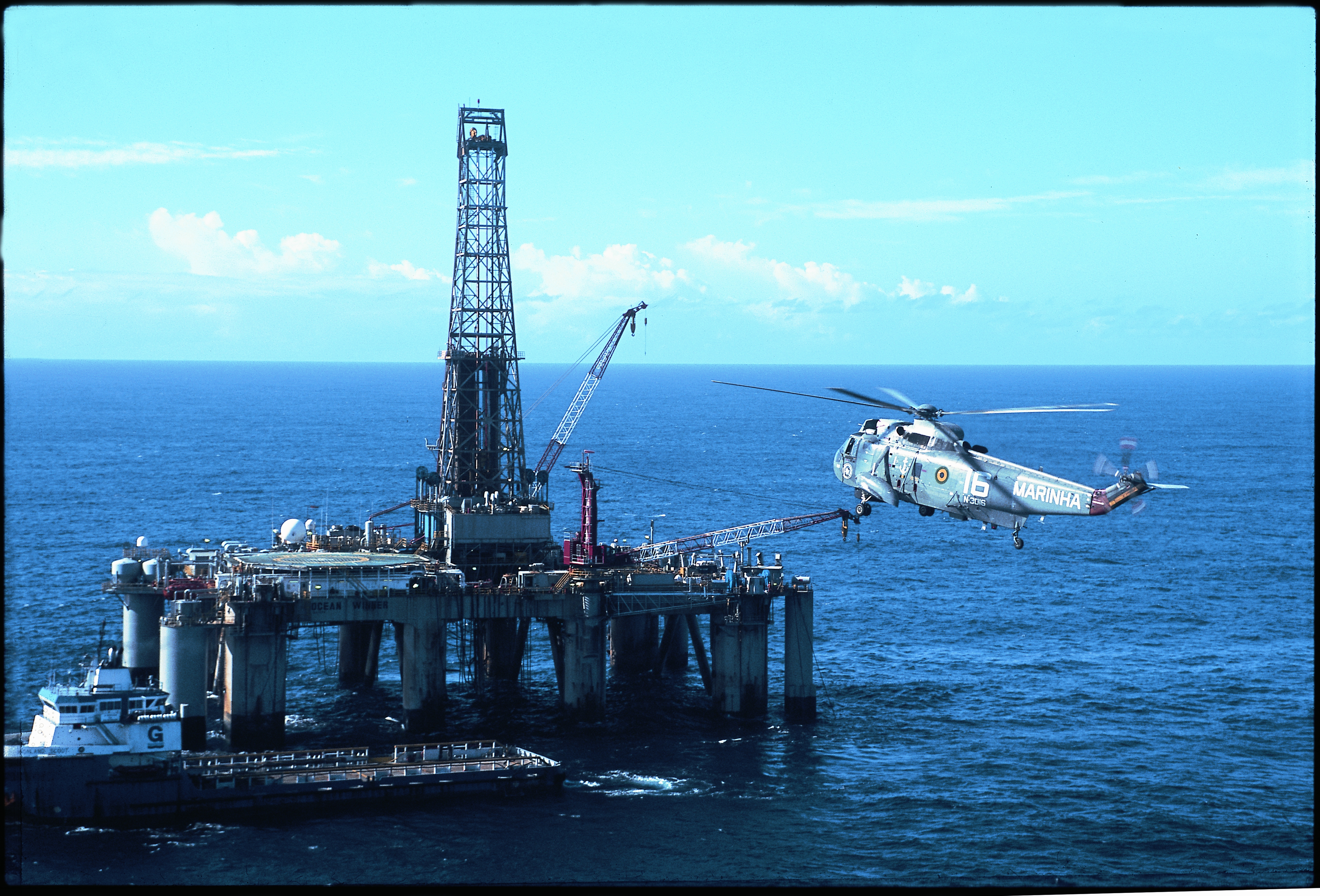
Sea King approaching an oil platform in 2006

The 1st Squadron of Antisubmarine Helicopters (1.º Esquadrão de Helicópteros Antissubmarino, EsqdHS-1), created on 28 May 1965, has as its main instruments its airborne sensors for the search of submarines, being able to attack submarine or surface targets. Its secondary attributions are transportation, medical evacuation, search and rescue, and shooting range. The squadron operated the SH-34J Sea Bat (1965–1975), SH-3 Sea King (1970–2012), and SH-16 Seahawk (2012–present). The Sea Kings were acquired to replace the SH-34J and complement the Westland Whirlwind as heavy helicopters. Equipped with radar, sonar, torpedoes and depth charges, they were the first in the Navy capable of detecting and attacking submerged submarines, and the squadron was the first to be officially certified for instrument flight rules. In 1984–1988 the fleet switched to the SH-3A standard from the Italian company Agusta, equipped with Exocet missiles for surface targets. Its successor, the Seahawk, has a fleet of six in 2020. It has Mk 46 torpedoes for submarines and Penguin missiles for surface targets; the Penguin can sink larger targets than the Sea Skua, such as a corvette or even a frigate, but a disadvantage is that the SH-16 only operates from large vessels, which are valuable targets.

==== EsqdHU-1 ====
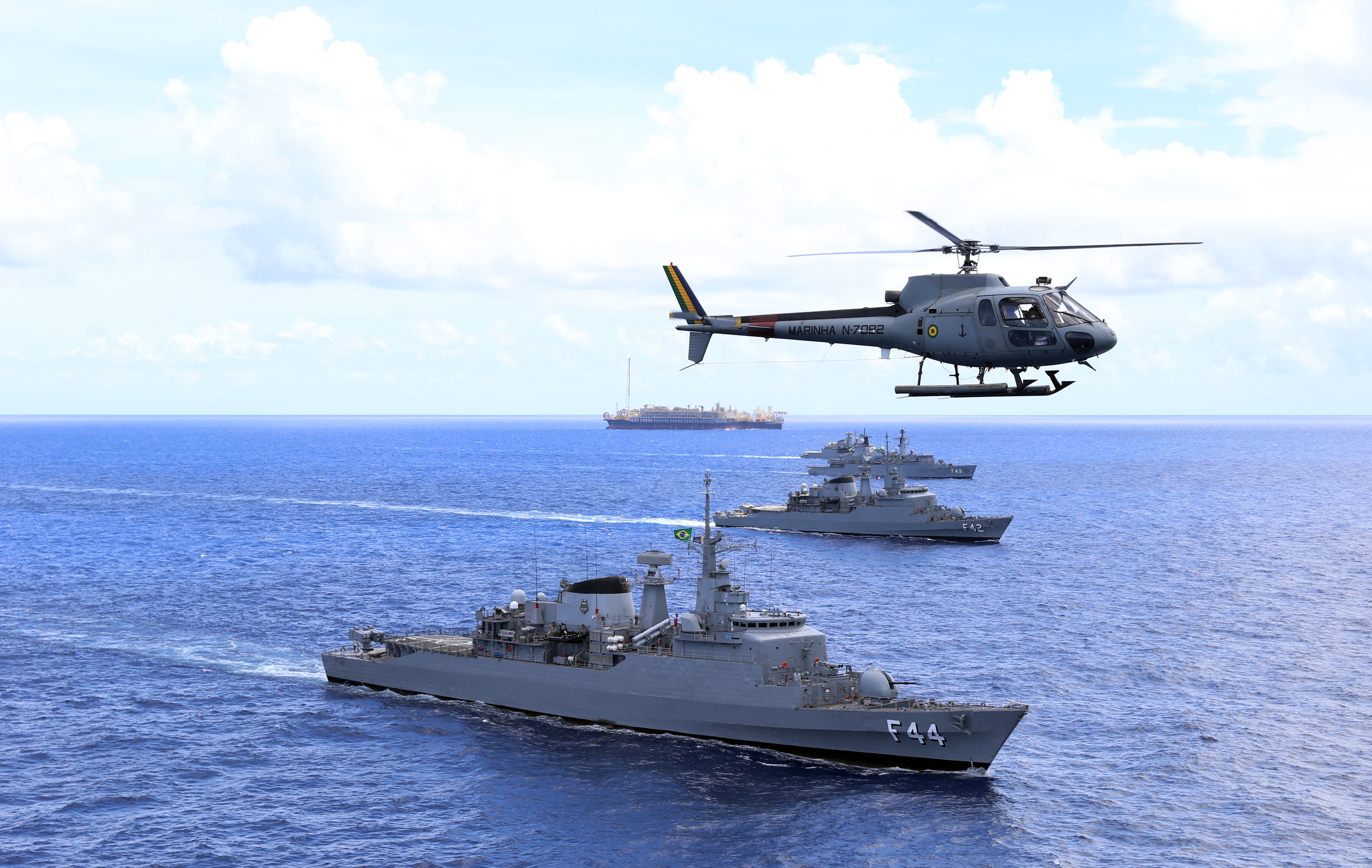
Esquilo flying over a naval force in 2017

The 1st General Purpose Helicopter Squadron (1.º Esquadrão de Helicópteros de Emprego Geral, EsqdHU-1), the Brazilian Navy's first operational air unit, was activated on 17 April 1962 and since then has participated in almost all naval air operations. Its attributions include air attack, clarification (visual or by radar), naval patrol, logistical support, aerial photogrammetry, search and rescue, aeromedical evacuation, daytime guard of aircraft on aircraft carriers, support to marine amphibious or special operations and participation in the Brazilian Antarctic Program. Visual reconnaissance, typical of the Esquilo and Jet Ranger, is conducted by flying to coordinates indicated by the ship to confirm targets or illegal activities; for this, they rely on lighting headlights. The UH-13 also has a weather radar. The squadron has used twelve models of helicopter in its history, currently operating the UH-12 Esquilo and the UH-17 (H135), which replaces the old UH-13. Both are small-sized. As of 2020, six UH-12s and three UH-13s are operational, which have suffered greater wear due to their prior use in Antarctica.

==== EsqdHU-2 ====
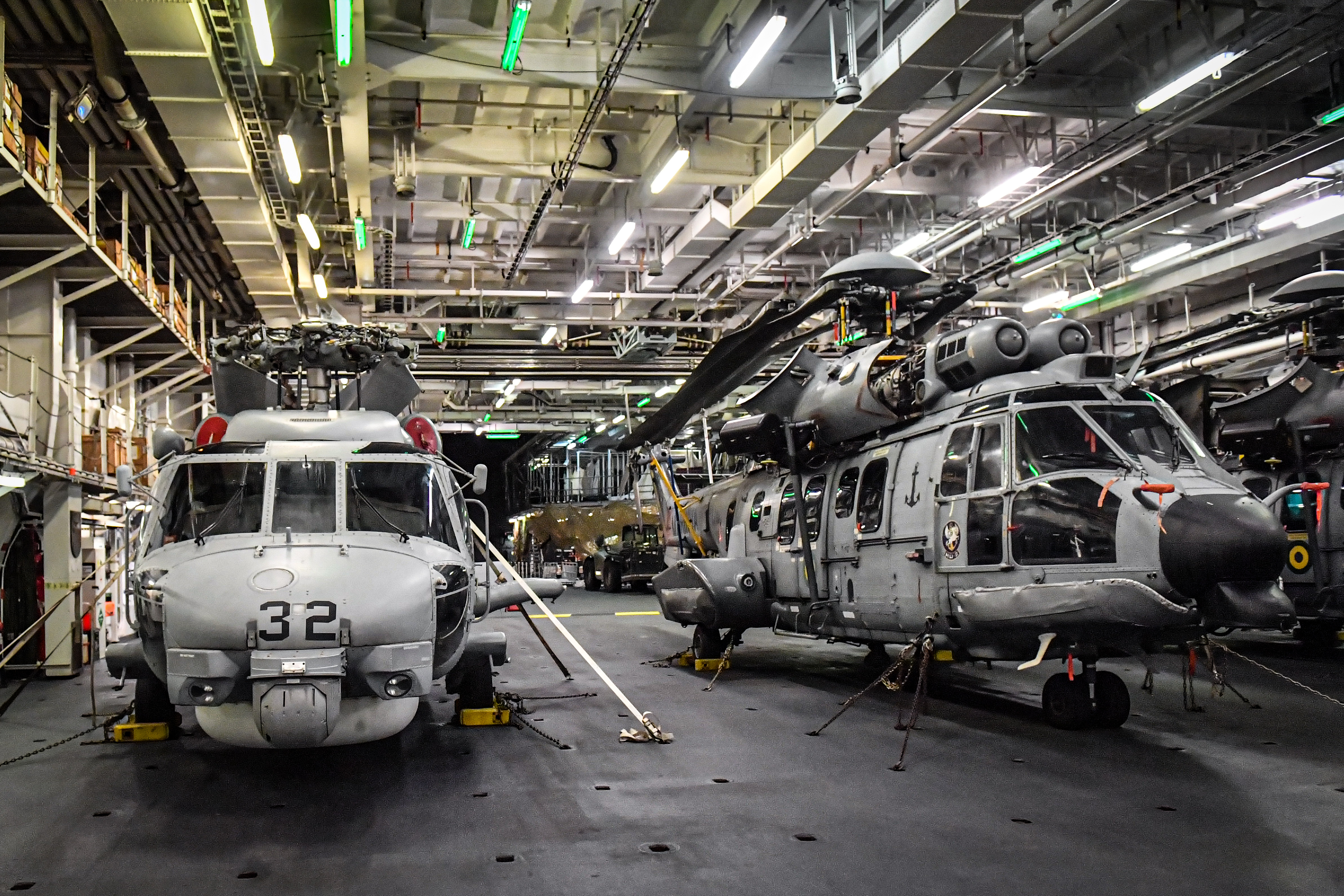
HU-2 Super Cougars in NAM Atlântico's hangar

The 2nd General Purpose Helicopter Squadron (2.º Esquadrão de Helicópteros de Emprego Geral, EsqdHU-2) was activated on 25 February 1988 with AS 332F1 Super Puma aircraft, designated UH-14. Its creation alleviated the heavy helicopter work hitherto performed by the Sea Kings, which diverted the HS-1 from its anti-submarine role. Since then, its most prominent roles have been transporting marines and guarding aircraft at night on aircraft carriers. It also performs cargo transport, medevac, firefighting and search and rescue. The Super Puma has some maritime intelligence capabilities with its radar, but it lacks Exocet missiles. Six Super Puma were originally purchased, serving until their retirement in 2018.

The successor to the UH-14 was the EC-725 Super Cougar, whose production was negotiated between the Brazilian government and Helibras/Airbus Helicopters in 2008, providing for the production of fifty aircraft in Itajubá, of which sixteen would belong to the Navy: eight in the basic version, designated UH-15, three in an intermediate version (UH-15A), and five in an operational version (AH-15B). The AH-15B, also called the H255M Naval, is the more complex version. Developed specifically for the Navy, it has modern anti-ship attack systems: Exocet AM39 B2M2 missiles, "Chaff & Flare" system, APS-143 tactical radar and FLIR Star Safire III equipment, integrated by a tactical mission data management system (NTDMS). Unlike the SH-16, it has no anti-submarine capabilities. In May 2022, the Navy reduced its order by one AH-15B, replacing it with more Esquilo helicopters. 14 aircraft had already been delivered by the end of 2022, including three AH-15Bs, However, the new helicopters are also intended for district means. (Note: "Receiving the Super Cougars will allow the Navy to create three new squadrons of helicopters: two in the Amazon — Belém and Manaus — and one in Florianópolis, in the south of the country." (Lopes 2014, Book II, chapter 14).) In January 2023 the squadron operated with ten helicopters.

==== EsqdQE-1 ====
The 1st Remotely Piloted Aircraft Squadron (1.° Esquadrão de Aeronaves Remotamente Pilotadas, EsqdQE-1), activated on 5 July 2022, is responsible for the six ScanEagle model drones, along with their launchers and pickups for ground and airborne operations.

=== District squadrons ===
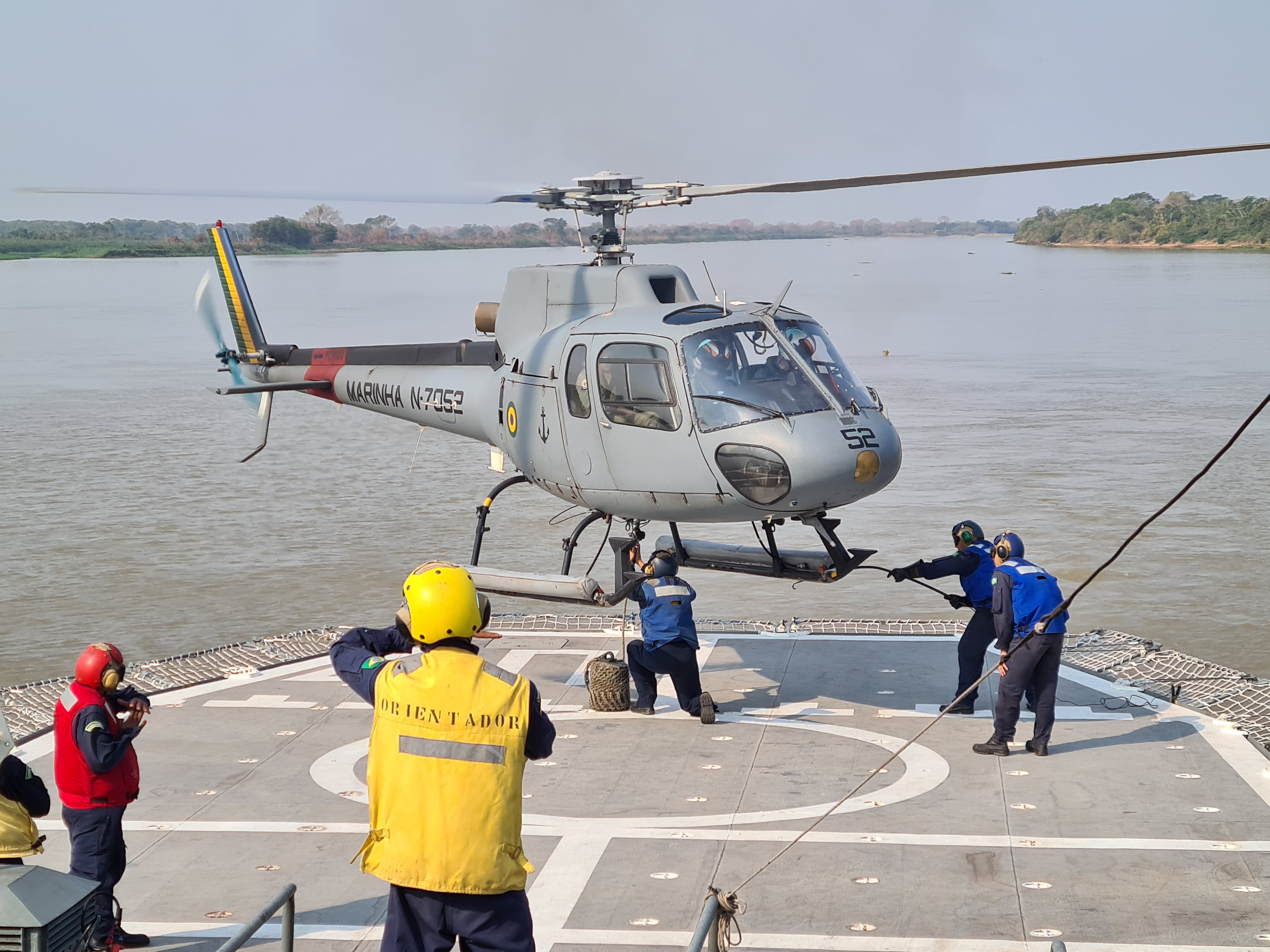
HU-61 Esquilo on the monitor Parnaíba, of the Mato Grosso flotilla, on the Paraguay river

- EsqdHU-41: the 1st General Employment Helicopter Squadron of the North, activated on 29 October 2019, is subordinated to the 4th Naval District (DN), in Belém, with three UH-15s to operate in the rivers and seas of Amapá, Pará and Maranhão.
- EsqdHU-51: the 1st General Employment Helicopter Squadron of the South was activated on 25 June 1998 under the name of 5th General Employment Helicopter Squadron (HU-5), changed to the current one in 2019. Headquartered in Rio Grande, it is subordinated to the 5th Naval District and operates in the southern region of Brazil, with three UH-12s in 2020.
- EsqdHU-61: the 1st General Employment Helicopter Squadron of the West was activated on 6 June 1995 with the name of 4th General Employment Helicopter Squadron (HU-4), changed to the current one in 2019. Headquartered in Ladário, it is subordinate to the 6th Naval District, with jurisdiction over the states of Mato Grosso and Mato Grosso do Sul. Naval Aviation had already operated there in 1932–1936 and resumed operations in 1989. As of 2020, it has three UH-12s. The aerial inspection area of the 6th Naval District is immense, 983 km of dry and flooded border with Bolivia and 1,290 km with Paraguay, through which vessels transport mineral reserves in the Plata basin and cross drug trafficking routes. The squadron's means are insufficient to meet the demand, and, to make matters worse, from 2004 to 2011 its UH-12s were replaced by the Jet Ranger, with worse performance, to remedy another lack of means in the Navy's corvettes and frigates. In 2014, the admirals already recognized the need for the region of a future squadron with medium helicopters, capable of transporting marines.
- EsqdHU-91: the 1st General Purpose Helicopter Squadron of the Northwest, originally the 3rd General Purpose Helicopter Squadron (HU-3), was activated on 14 January 1994 in Manaus, where it is subordinated to the 9th Naval District. The presence of Naval Aviation in the area dates back to 1979, when its predecessor, the Embarked Air Detachment of the Amazon Flotilla (DAE-FlotAM) was created. Support for the Amazon Flotilla remains as its function. Its development reflects the gradual growth in the importance of the Amazon in the concerns of the Brazilian Armed Forces, with guidelines such as the presence of the Revolutionary Armed Forces of Colombia across the border, against which the Navy participated in Operation Traíra in 1991, and the fear of the military with the internationalization of the Amazon. Reinforcing the Amazon Flotilla and monitoring the Amazon basin thus competed with the Navy's traditional concern for blue waters. DAE-FlotAM's original allocation of two Bell Jet Ranger IIs was replaced by three UH-12s upon squadron activation. As of 2020 the squadron operates five UH-12s. The 2009 PAEMB had provided for the installation of six medium-sized helicopters in Manaus.

== Equipment ==
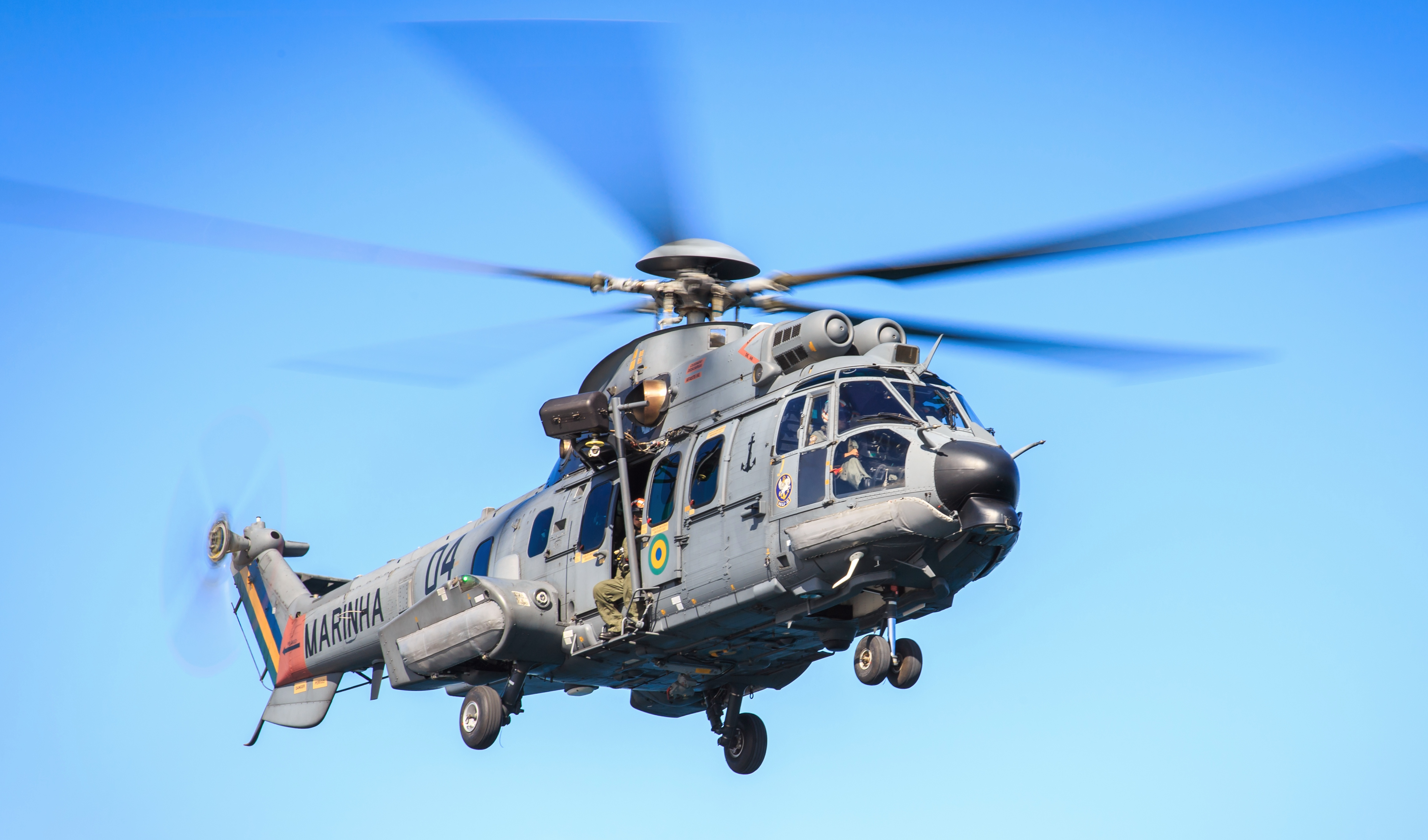
A EC725 of the Brazilian Navy

=== Aircraft ===
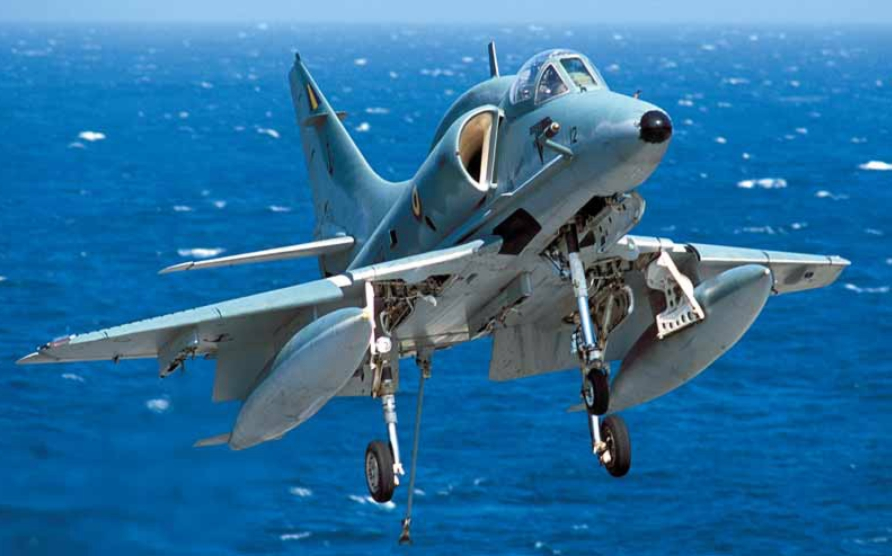
A-4KU approaching the carrier Sao Paulo

| Aircraft | Origin | Type | Variant | In service | Notes |
Combat aircraft
| A-4 Skyhawk | United States | Multirole | AF-1B | 3 | |
Helicopters
| Eurocopter AS350 | France | Utility / Trainer | | 17 | 15 on order |
| Eurocopter EC135 | Germany | Utility | | 2 | |
| Eurocopter EC725 | France | Utility / SAR / ASuW | | 13 | |
| Sikorsky S-70 | United States | ASuW / SAR | S-70B | 6 | |
| Westland Lynx | United Kingdom | ASuW | Lynx 21 | 5 | |
Trainers
| Bell 206 | United States | Rotary-wing trainer | | 10 | |
| TA-4K Skyhawk | United States | Conversion trainer | AF-1C | 3 | |

== Personnel ==
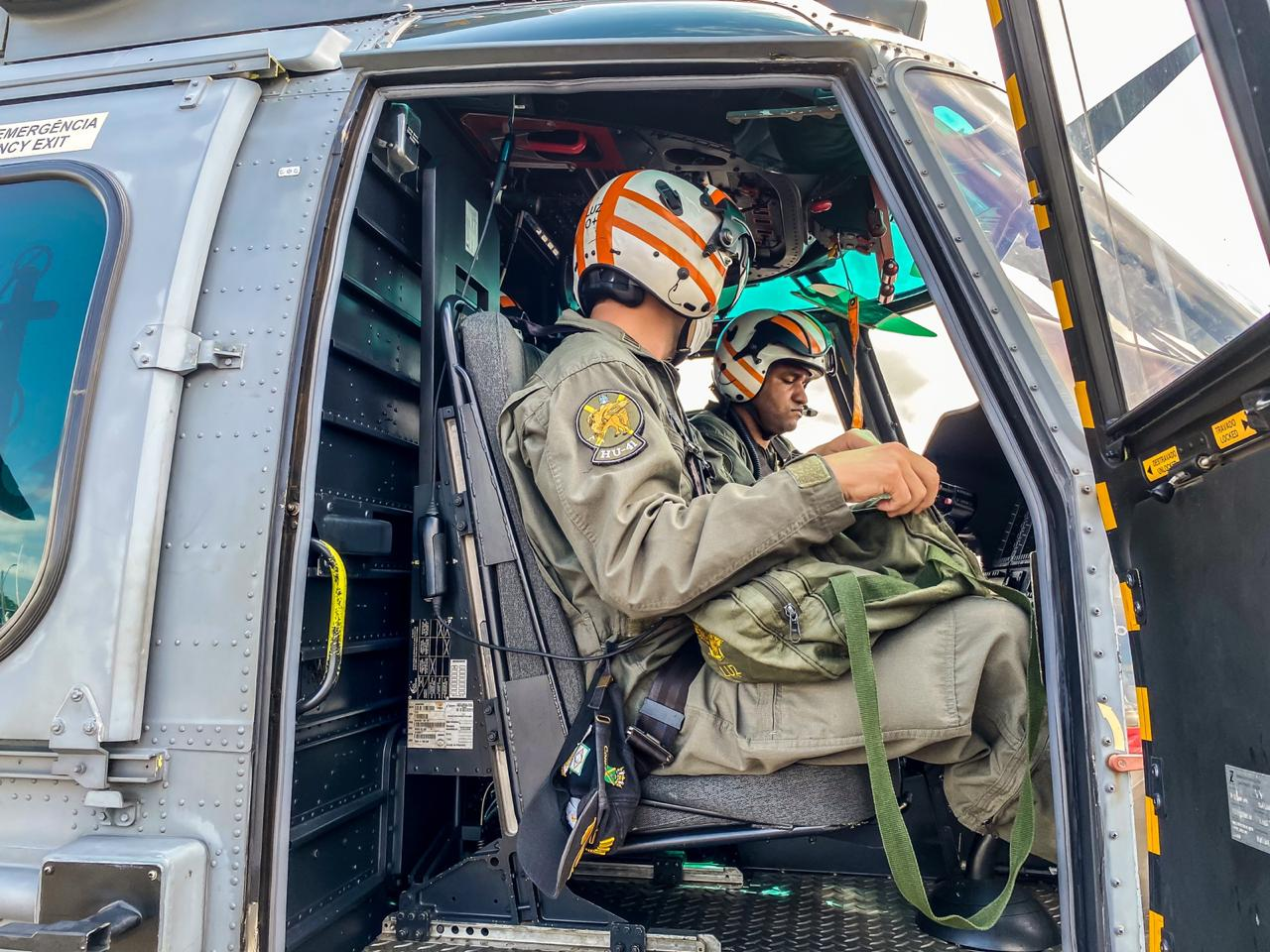
Super Cougar crew

Naval Aviation personnel, enlisted personnel and officers, begin their training at CIAAN, a school-unit with several courses. Sailors, corporals and sergeants train as mechanics, in charge of onboard maneuvers, systems operators, air traffic controllers and other specialists. Only officers are pilots, and every pilot has previous experience on board. The Navy's language, way of working and operational focuses distinguish naval aviators from common aviators.

Officers are first trained at the Naval School or at the Almirante Wandenkolk Instruction Center, where most choose to serve in the Navy Corps. Those who opt for the Marine Corps at the beginning of their careers are a minority, and the officers of the third Corps, the Intendency, are not eligible to join. After one to three years in conventional activities, they undergo a difficult selection, especially in the physical aspect, to join the CIAAN. There they learn theory (such as meteorology, air traffic rules and aerodynamics) in the Aviation Improvement Course for Officers (CAAVO). The center has several flight simulators. Practical teaching is at the 1st Instruction Helicopter Squadron, possibly with a previous period at the Brazilian Army Aviation base in Taubaté or at the Air Force Academy (AFA) in Pirassununga. Some of those who follow the AFA are selected to fly on fixed wing aircraft. This training is the longest, lasting almost four years, also comprising periods in the U.S. Air Force and Navy, where they learn hooked landing and catapult operations aboard aircraft carriers.
