= AMX =

AMX may refer to:

== Companies and finance ==
- AMX LLC, a manufacturer of commercial and residential control systems
- AMX index (Amsterdam Midkap Index), a stock market index of Euronext Amsterdam
- América Móvil (Mexican Stock Exchange ticker symbol: AMX), Mexican telecommunications company
- Armenia Securities Exchange, a stock exchange operating in Armenia

== Aviation and military ==
- Aeroméxico (ICAO airline designator: AMX), a Mexican airline
- AMX International AMX, a fighter aircraft
- AMX International, the company that makes the AMX aircraft
- Ateliers de construction d'Issy-les-Moulineaux, French construction workshop that builds armored vehicles
  - AMX-50, heavy tank
  - AMX-30, main battle tank
  - AMX-13, light tank
  - AMX-10 RC, armored fighting vehicle
  - AMX Leclerc, main battle tank

== Technology ==
- AMX192, a lighting control standard
- Advanced Matrix Extensions, an Intel Sapphire Rapids processor feature

== Other uses ==
- AMX Mod, a server-side modification for Half-Life games
- AMC AMX, a sports car made by American Motors Corporation
