= List of active Brazilian military aircraft =

Seal of the Brazilian Armed Forces

The following is a list of military aircraft currently in service with the Brazilian Armed Forces.

== Air Force ==
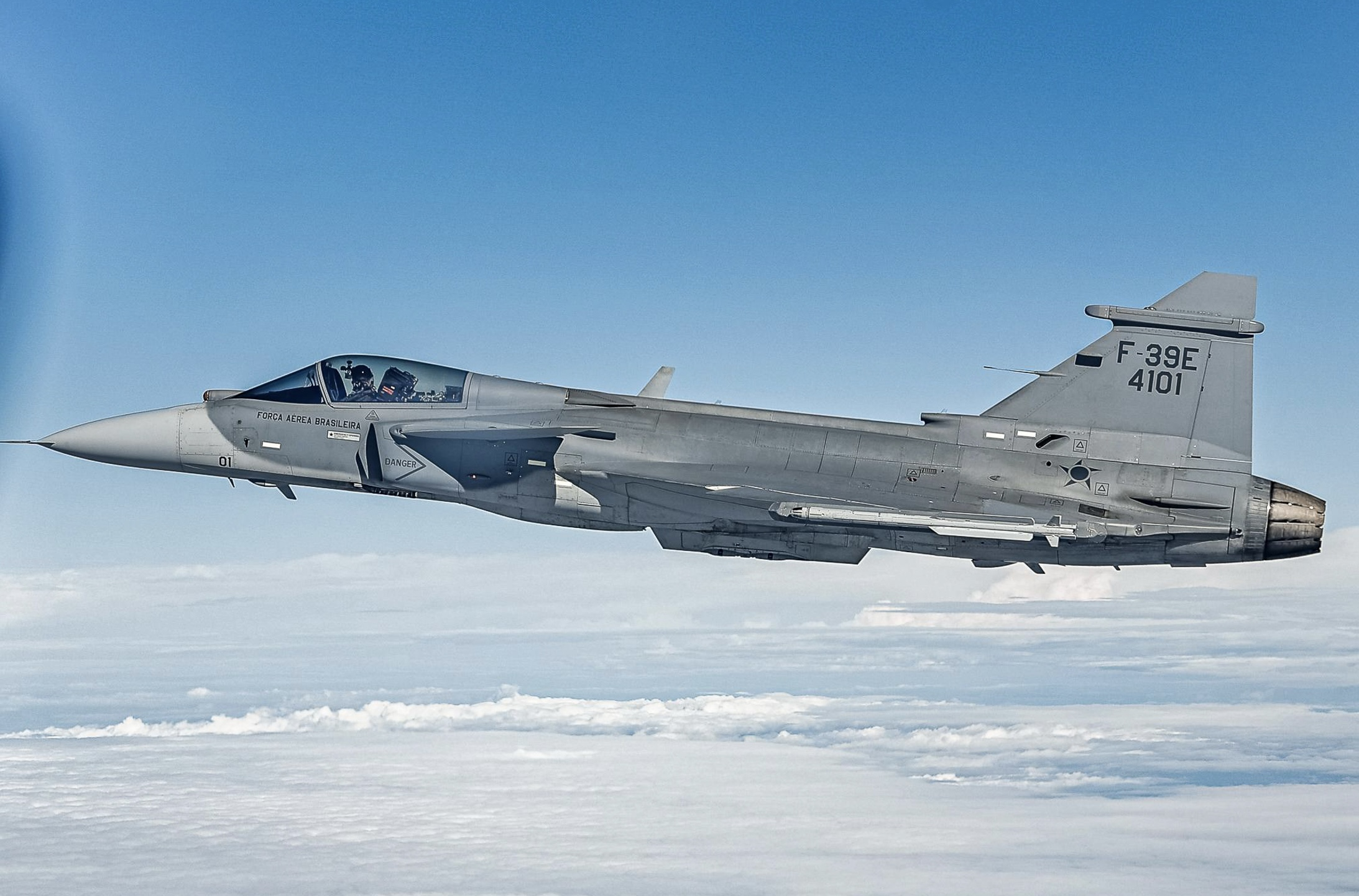
The F-39E Gripen over Gavião Peixoto

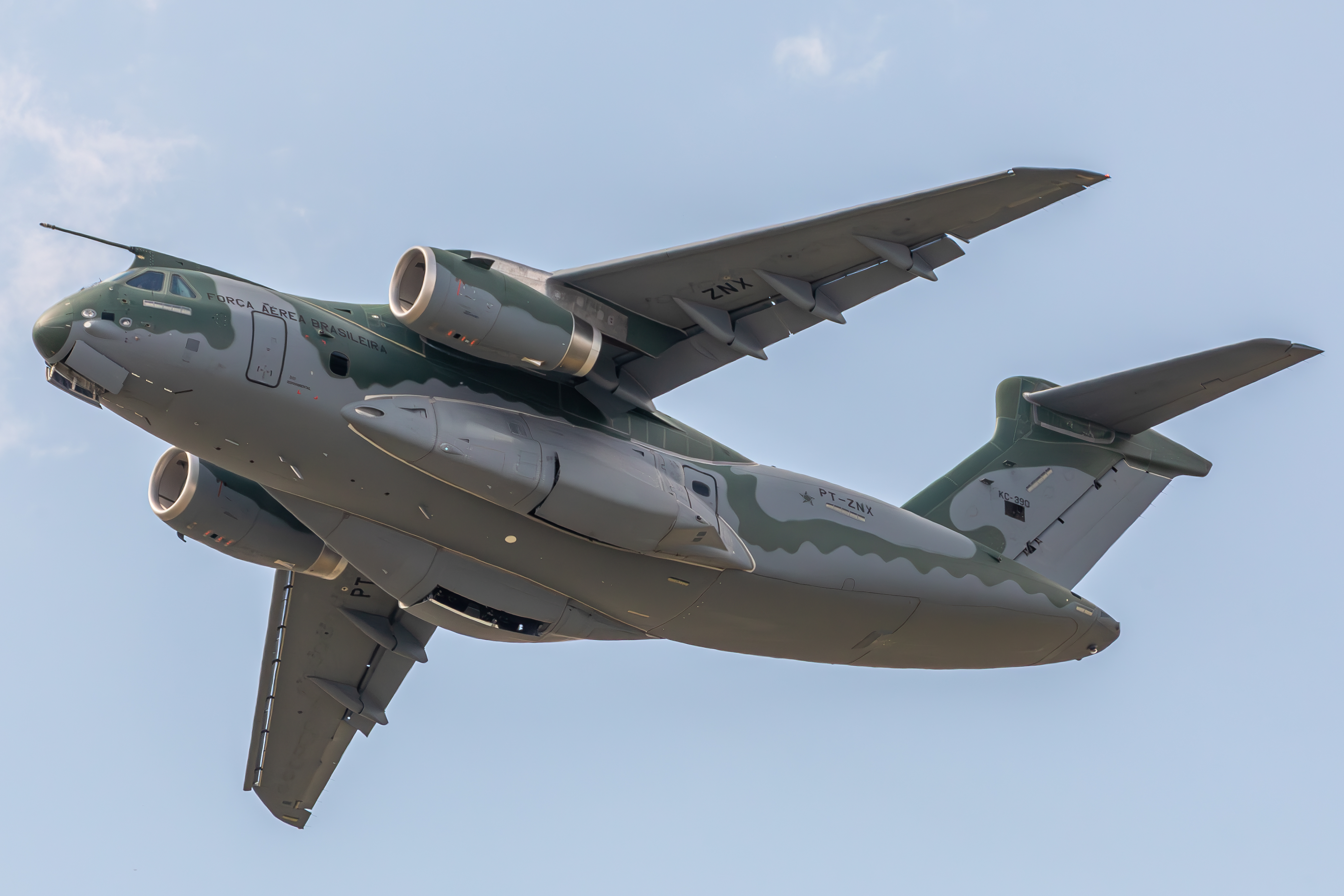
The KC-390 at the Paris Air Show

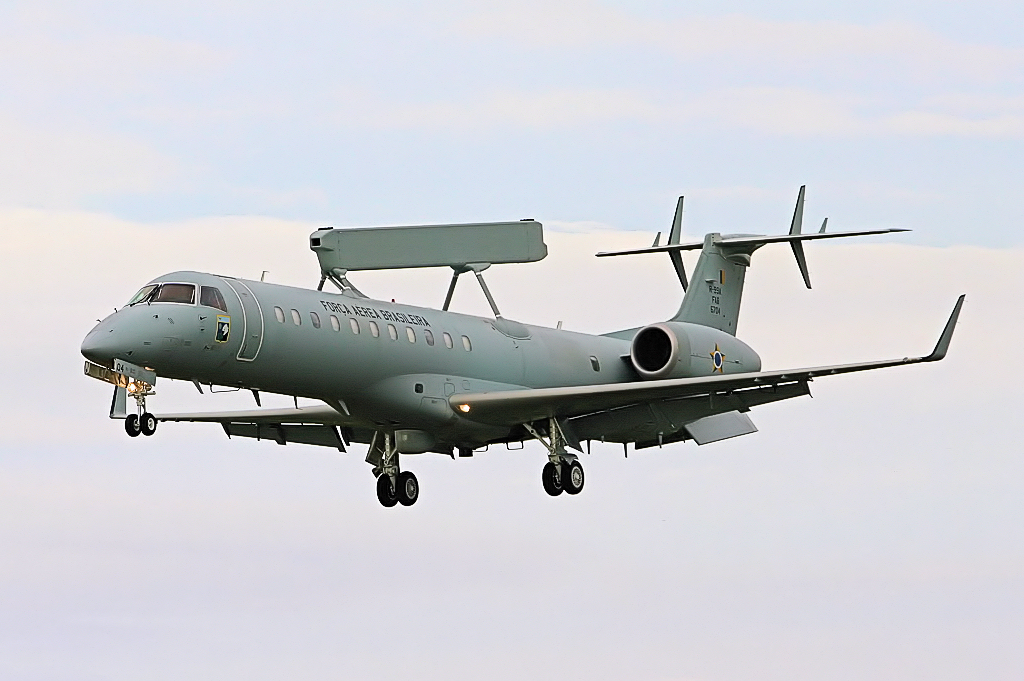
A Embraer E-99 AEW&C in flight

Aircraft	Origin	Type	Variant	In service	Notes
Combat aircraft
JAS 39 Gripen	Sweden Brazil	multirole	F-39E F-39F (Note: The two-seat (JAS-39F variant) will be used in combat operations with weapon systems officer's back seat with jamming, information warfare, network attack and electronic warfare roles.)	13	23 on order
Northrop F-5	United States	fighter	F-5EM	34	
AMX International	Brazil Italy	attack	A-1 A-1M A-1BM	10	
Embraer EMB 314	Brazil	COIN	A-29A A-29B	81	
AEW&C
Embraer E-99	Brazil	AEW&C	E-99M	5	
Reconnaissance
Embraer R-99	Brazil	SIGINT	R-99	3	
Embraer EMB 110	Brazil	surveillance	RC-95	4	
Learjet 35	United States	surveillance	RC-35	6	
Maritime patrol
Embraer 110	Brazil	maritime patrol	P-95A P-95BM	8	
Lockheed P-3	United States	maritime patrol	P-3AM	3	
Transport
Airbus A330-200	Europe	VIP transport transport	KC-30	2 (Note: One aircraft used for presidential flight provisionally. New presidential aircraft to be selected.)	one for presidential flight – Brazilian Air Force One
Embraer C-390	Brazil	transport aerial refueling	KC-390	7	12 on order
CASA C-295	Spain	transport SAR	C-105	13 (Note: Three used for SAR operations.)	
Embraer 100	Brazil	utility VIP transport	U-100	2	2 on order
Embraer 110	Brazil	utility transport	C-95	35	
Embraer 120	Brazil	utility VIP transport	C-97	17	
Embraer 190	Brazil	VIP transport	VC-2	3	
Cessna 208	United States	utility	C-98	30	
Embraer ERJ-145	Brazil	VIP transport	VC-99	6	
Helicopters
Eurocopter EC725	France	transport VIP	H-36 VH-36	14 (Note: Two VH-36 used for VIP transport.)	2 on order – manufactured by Helibras
Eurocopter EC 135	France	VIP	VH-35	2	
Sikorsky UH-60	United States	utility	H-60	16	3 on order
Trainer aircraft
Northrop F-5	United States	jet trainer	F-5FM	4	Phased out by 2029
Embraer EMB 312	Brazil	advanced trainer	T-27 T-27M	31	
Neiva Universal	Brazil	trainer	T-25M	168	All units modernized.
Eurocopter AS 350	France	rotorcraft trainer	H-50	19	11 on order
UAV
Hermes 450	Israel	reconnaissance		4	
Hermes 900	Israel	reconnaissance		1	2 units lost
IAI Heron	Israel	reconnaissance		2	

== Army Aviation ==
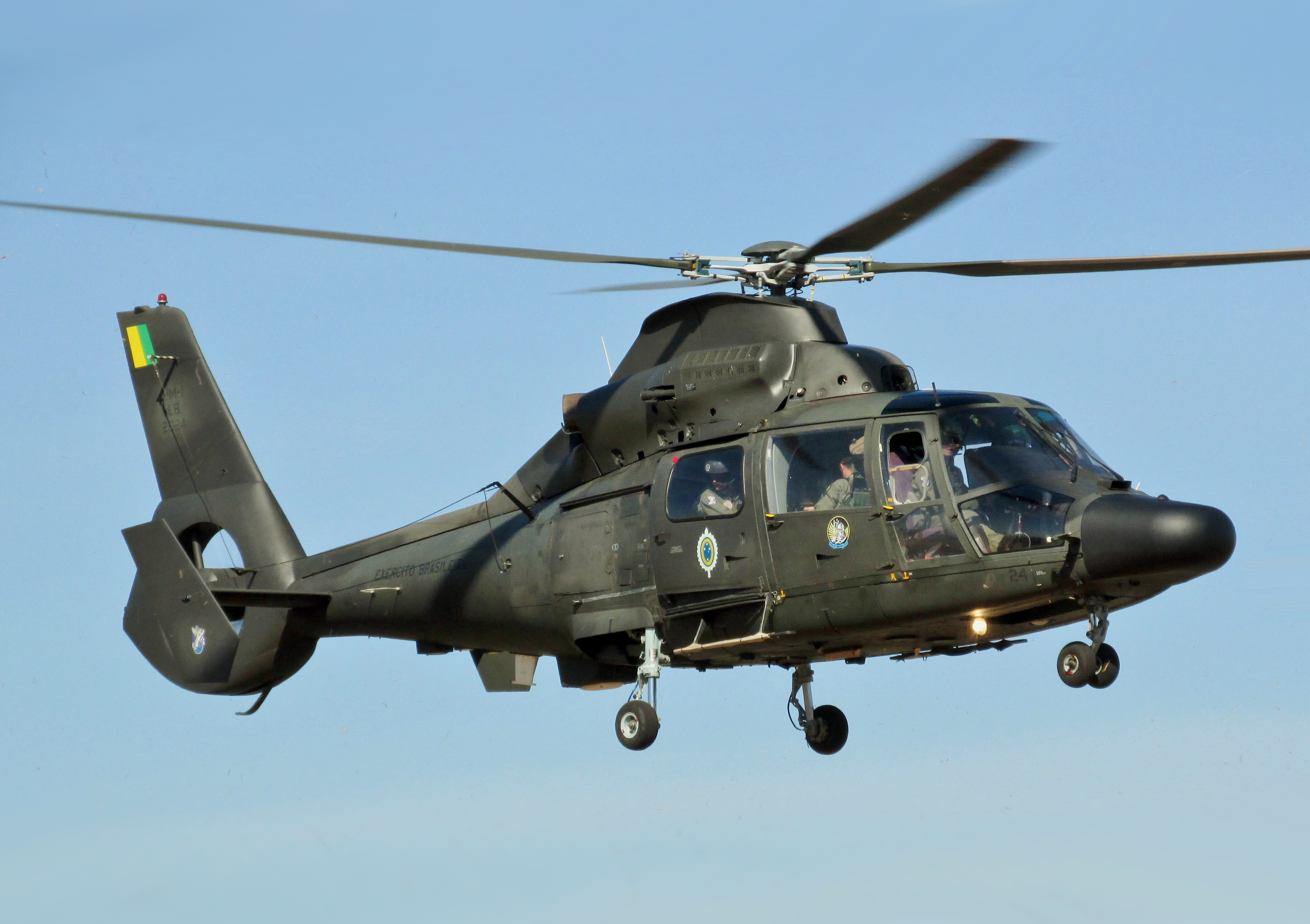
The AS565 of the Army Aviation Command

Aircraft	Origin	Type	Variant	In service	Notes
Helicopters
Sikorsky UH-60	United States	utility	HM-2	4	To be withdrawn replaced by 12 UH-60M
Eurocopter AS550	France	liaison	HA-1A	33	Assembled by Helibras
Eurocopter AS565	France	utility	HM-1A	32	Assembled by Helibras
Eurocopter AS532	France	transport utility	HM-3	7	To be withdrawn, assembled by Helibras
Eurocopter EC725	France	transport utility	HM-4	14	2 on order - assembled by Helibras

== Naval Aviation ==
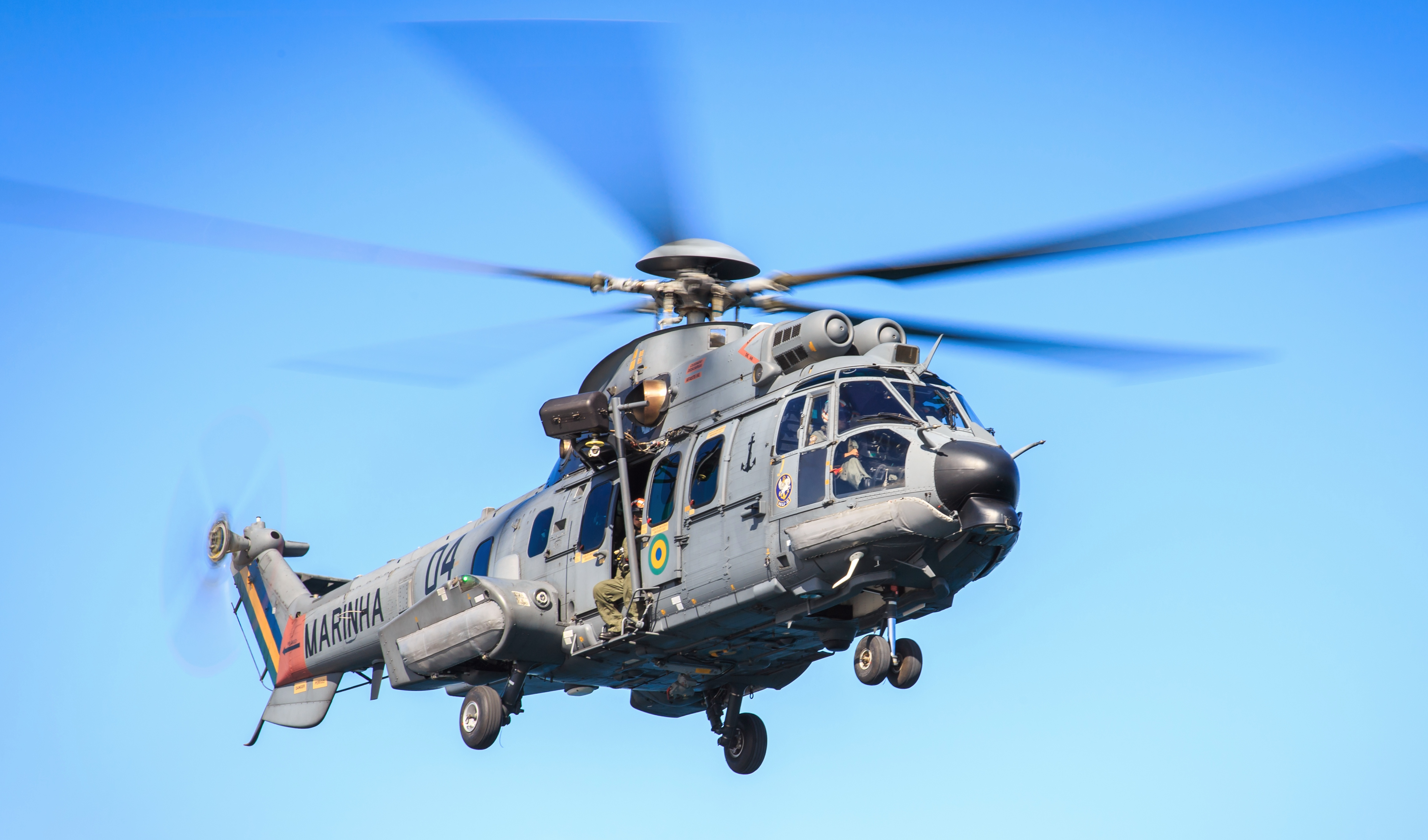
A EC725 flies over the Atlantic Ocean

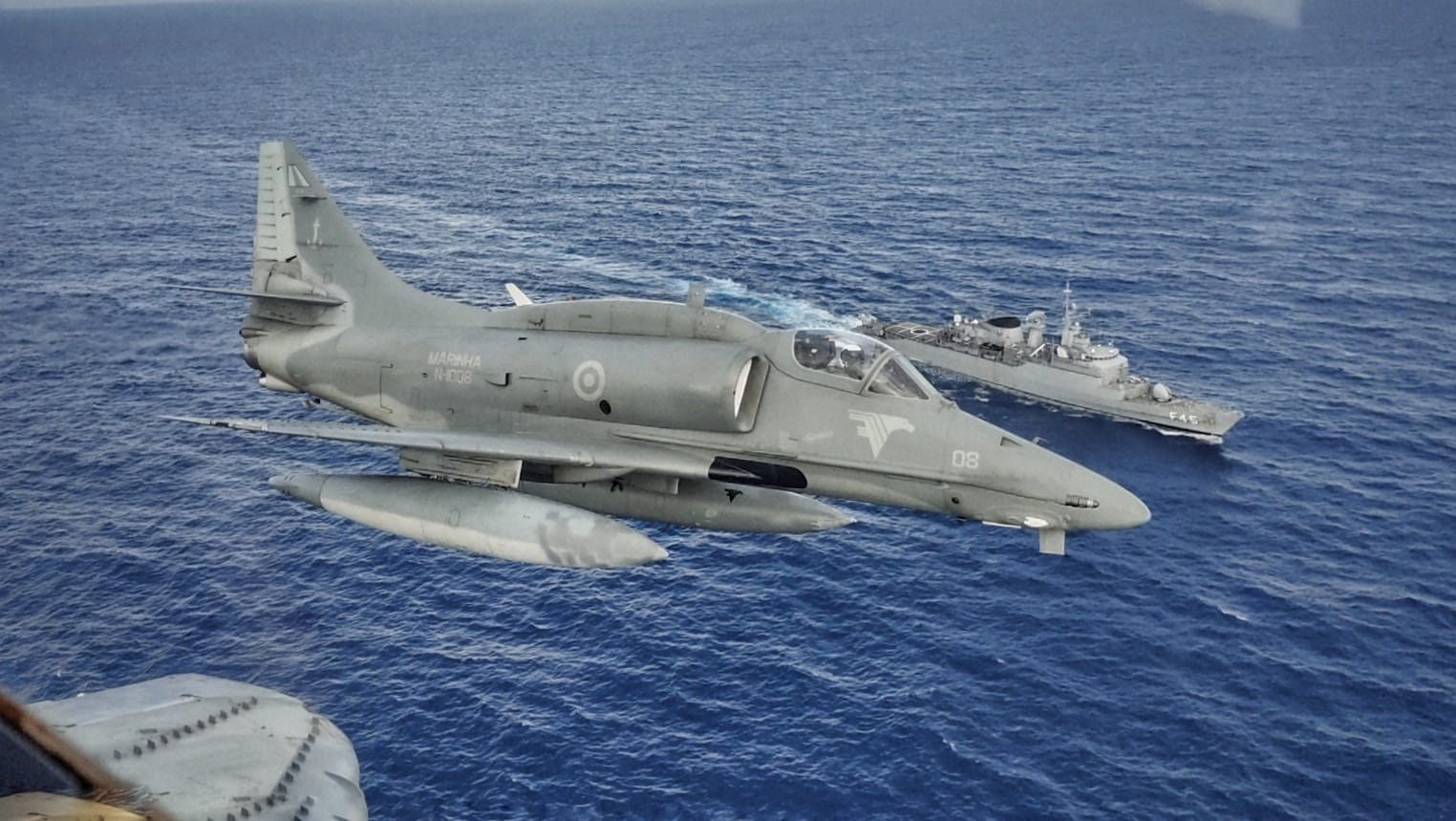
The A-4 in flight

Aircraft	Origin	Type	Variant	In service	Notes
Combat aircraft
A-4 Skyhawk	United States	carrier based fighter	A-4KU	3	
Helicopters
Sikorsky SH-60	United States	ASuW ASW SAR	SH-16	6	
Westland Lynx	United Kingdom	ASuW ASW	Mk. 21 Mk. 21A	5	
Eurocopter EC725	France	utility SAR ASuW	UH-15 UH-15A AH-15	15	
Eurocopter AS350	France	utility	UH-12 UH-12A	17	15 H-125 (UH-18) on order – assembled by Helibras
Airbus H135	Germany	utility	UH-35	2	
Trainer aircraft
Bell 206	United States	rotorcraft trainer	IH-6	5	To be replaced by H-125 (IH-18)
A-4 Skyhawk	United States	jet trainer	TA-4KU	3	
