= Helibras =

Helicopter manufacturer in Brazil

- Company type: Joint Stock
- Industry: Aerospace / Defense
- Founded: 1978
- Headquarters: Itajubá, Minas Gerais, Brazil
- Key people: Gilberto Peralta, President
- Products: Helicopters, aircraft components, mission systems for air and ground operation
- Revenue: R$703 million
- Number of employees: 500
- Parent: Airbus Helicopters (Airbus)
- Website: helibras.com.br

Helibras or Helicópteros do Brasil S.A. (Helicopters of Brazil, Inc.) is a Brazil-based helicopter manufacturer which is a wholly owned subsidiary of Airbus Helicopters, a division of Airbus.

Helibras has produced and delivered more than 800 helicopters, 70% of which being the Eurocopter AS350 Écureuil (known in Portuguese as Esquilo). Ten percent of total production is exported to Latin American countries such as Argentina, Bolivia, Chile, Mexico, Paraguay, Uruguay, and Venezuela. Helibras leads the Brazilian market of turbine helicopters in operation, the company's rotorcraft comprising 54 per cent of those used in the civilian market. It has a greater lead within the domestic military market, the company's share being roughly 66 per cent.

== History ==
Helibras was founded on 1 January 1978 in São Jose dos Campos, São Paulo state, Brazil. Since 1980, the company has been located in Itajubá, a city and municipality in southwestern Minas Gerais state, Brazil. Formerly, Helibras was jointly owned by MGI Participações (MGI Investments – owned by the government of the federal state of Minas Gerais), Bueninvest and Eurocopter. As of 2006, Helibras became a wholly owned subsidiary of Eurocopter (now Airbus Helicopters) which in turn is owned by Airbus Group. It is the only manufacturer of helicopters in Latin America.

The most numerous helicopter type to be produced by Helibras is the Eurocopter AS350 Écureuil; of the 600 helicopters that the company has domestically manufactured for the Brazilian market by 2012, 70 per cent were AS350s. Brazil has been a major market for the AS350; by 2011 more than 300 helicopters were reportedly operating throughout the country, including from the flight deck of the Brazilian aircraft carrier São Paulo. Since 1984, the Brazilian Navy has used AS350s to support the Brazilian Antarctic Program. In January 2011, Helibras signed a contract with the Brazilian Army to substantially upgrade and refurbish their existing fleet of 36 AS350 Ecureuils.

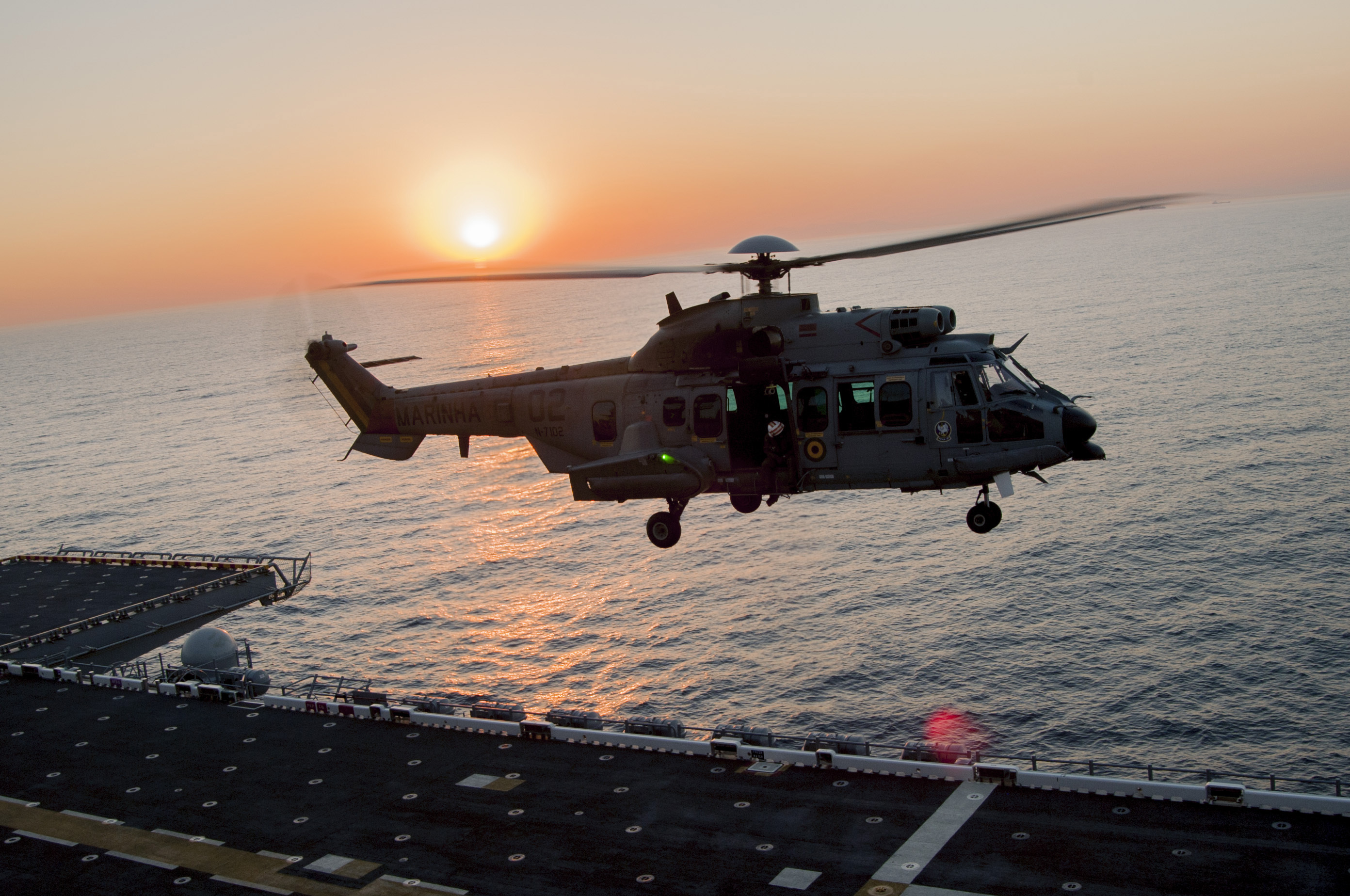
A Brazilian EC725 preparing to land on the flight deck of amphibious assault ship USS America, 2014

The Eurocopter AS565 Panther helicopter was another licensed design produced locally by Helibras. During 1988, the Brazilian Army Aviation took delivery of its first Panthers. In January 2010, Helibras was awarded a contract to upgrade 34 AS365K Panthers to the new AS365 K2 standard. Changes on the Panther K2 include new Turbomeca Arriel 2C2CG engines which produce 40% more power, a glass cockpit containing new avionics and radio systems, a four-axis autopilot, a new weather radar, NVG-compatibility, and measures to reduce pilot workload, and shall extend the airframe's service life for a further 25 years. In March 2014, the first two Panther K2 rotorcraft were delivered to the Brazilian Army. In September 2014, the Panther K2 passed its technical operation evaluation, having reportedly demonstrated a 98% availability rating throughout the trial period, clearing the way for the full modernisation program to proceed.

During September 2008, the Brazilian Government announced that Helibras' factory in Itajubá, Minas Gerais, would produce an initial 50 Eurocopter EC725s under a $1 billion order. These 50 helicopters are to be used by the Brazilian Navy, the Brazilian Air Force (FAB) and Brazilian Army. By December 2010, three helicopters were undergoing flight tests prior to entering military service. In 2012, Helibras began assembly of the rest of the order. In April 2014, Helibras and MBDA were in the process of integrating the anti-ship Exocet missile, which are also 50%-built in Brazil. On 19 June 2014, the Brazilian Navy formally accepted delivery of the first EC725. By July 2015, the Brazilian armed forces had taken delivery of 16 H225Ms; deliveries were reported at the time to continue until 2019. By 1 October 2015, Brazil's H225M fleet had attained 10,000 flight hours. In December 2015, Helibras delivered the first pair of H225Ms to be delivered to a full operational capability (FOC) standard to the Brazilian military.

== Products ==
=== Civil ===
- EC120 Colibri
- AS350 B2 Esquilo
- AS350 B3 Esquilo
- AS355
- EC130
- EC135

=== Military ===
- AS532
- AS550
- AS555
- EC635
- EC725

== See also ==
- Defense industry of Brazil
- Cicaré
- AeroDreams
- RACA S.A.
