= Xeon D =

Brand of computer chip

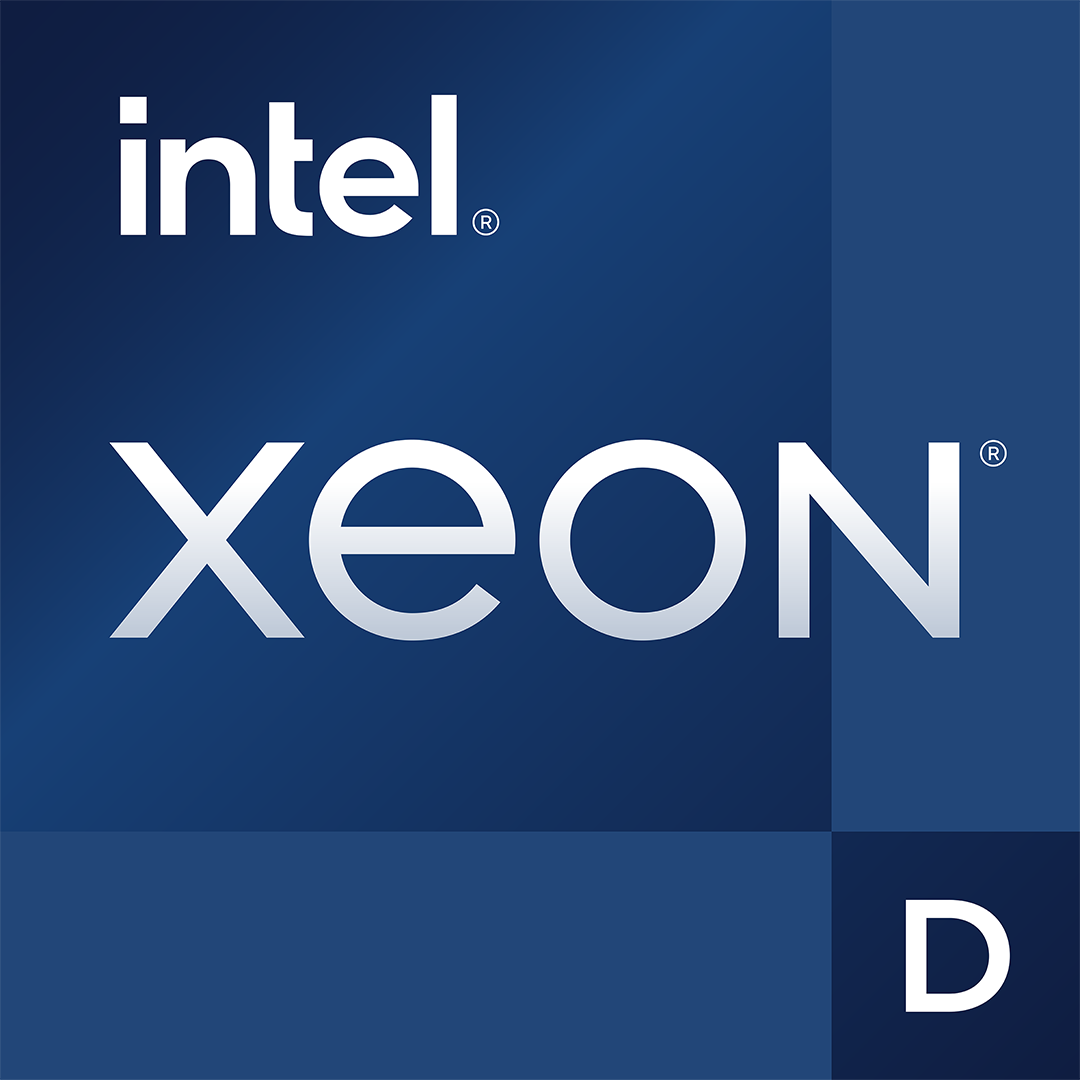
- Logo since 2020

General information
- Launched: March 9, 2015
- Designed by: Intel
- Common manufacturer: Intel

Performance
- Max. CPU clock rate: 1.30 GHz to 3.00 GHz

Architecture and classification
- Technology node: 14 nm to 10 nm
- Microarchitecture: Broadwell; Skylake; Ice Lake
- Instruction set: x86-16, IA-32, x86-64

The Xeon D is a brand of x86 system on a chip designed, manufactured, and marketed by Intel, targeted at the microserver market. It was announced in 2014, with the first products released in 2015. Related to the Xeon brand of workstation and server processors are based on the same architecture as server-grade CPUs, with support for ECC memory, higher core counts, support for larger amounts of RAM, and a larger cache. Unique to the Xeon D line, emphasis was also made on low power consumption, and integrated hardware blocks such as a network interface controllers, a PCIe root complex, and USB and SATA controllers.

Early 2025, the Xeon 6 SoC line was announced as the 'next gen' for at least a part of the Xeon D lineup.

== Design goals ==
The Xeon D was designed to offer better performance per watt compared to the Xeon E3 and better absolute performance compared to the Atom processors, while operating at lower power and higher densities than Xeon E5 processors. Particularly, the Xeon D was designed to compete with emerging ARM microarchitecture–based server solutions, by offering superior single core performance.

== Generations ==
=== Broadwell ===
All Xeon D Broadwell models were designed for the SoC Server market segment, with the FCBGA1667 interface. They are equipped with dual-channel DDR4, up to 128GB with ECC support.

Cores (threads)	Processor branding and model		Base frequency	Turbo frequency		TDP	L3 cache	Release date	Price (USD)
Cores (threads)	Processor branding and model		Base frequency	Single core	All cores	TDP	L3 cache	Release date	Price (USD)
16 (32)	Xeon D	D-1587	1.7 GHz	—	2.3 GHz	65 W	24 MB	Q1 2016	$1754
16 (32)	Xeon D	D-1581	1.8 GHz	—	2.4 GHz	65 W	24 MB	Q1 2016	
16 (32)	Xeon D	D-1577	1.3 GHz	—	2.1 GHz	45 W	24 MB	Q1 2016	$1477
16 (32)	Xeon D	D-1571	1.3 GHz	—	2.1 GHz	45 W	24 MB	Q1 2016	$1222
12 (24)	Xeon D	D-1567	2.1 GHz	—	2.7 GHz	65 W	18 MB	Q1 2016	$1299
12 (24)	Xeon D	D-1559	1.5 GHz	—	2.1 GHz	45 W	18 MB	Q2 2016	$883
12 (24)	Xeon D	D-1557	1.5 GHz	—	2.1 GHz	45 W	18 MB	Q1 2016	$844
8 (16)	Xeon D	D-1553N	2.3 GHz	—	2.7 GHz	65 W	12 MB	Q3 2017	$855
8 (16)	Xeon D	D-1548	2.0 GHz	—	2.6 GHz	45 W	12 MB	Q4 2015	$675
8 (16)	Xeon D	D-1543N	1.9 GHz	—	2.4 GHz	45 W	12 MB	Q3 2017	$652
8 (16)	Xeon D	D-1541	2.1 GHz	—	2.7 GHz	45 W	12 MB	Q4 2015	$581
8 (16)	Xeon D	D-1540	2.0 GHz	—	2.6 GHz	45 W	12 MB	Q1 2015	$581
8 (16)	Xeon D	D-1539	1.6 GHz	—	2.2 GHz	35 W	12 MB	Q2 2016	$590
8 (16)	Xeon D	D-1537	1.7 GHz	—	2.3 GHz	35 W	12 MB	Q4 2015	$571
6 (12)	Xeon D	D-1533N	2.1 GHz	—	2.7 GHz	45 W	9 MB	Q3 2017	$470
6 (12)	Xeon D	D-1531	2.2 GHz	—	2.7 GHz	45 W	9 MB	Q4 2015	$348
4 (8)	Xeon D	D-1529	1.3 GHz	—	1.3 GHz	20 W	6 MB	Q2 2016	$324
6 (12)	Xeon D	D-1528	1.9 GHz	—	2.5 GHz	35 W	9 MB	Q4 2015	$389
4 (8)	Xeon D	D-1527	2.2 GHz	—	2.7 GHz	35 W	6 MB	Q4 2015	$259
4 (8)	Xeon D	D-1523N	2.0 GHz	—	2.6 GHz	45 W	6 MB	Q3 2017	$256
4 (8)	Xeon D	D-1521	2.4 GHz	—	2.7 GHz	45 W	6 MB	Q4 2015	$199
4 (8)	Xeon D	D-1520	2.2 GHz	—	2.6 GHz	45 W	6 MB	Q1 2015	$199
4 (8)	Xeon D	D-1518	2.2 GHz	—	2.2 GHz	35 W	6 MB	Q4 2015	$234
4 (8)	Xeon D	D-1513N	1.6 GHz	—	2.2 GHz	35 W	6 MB	Q3 2017	$192

=== Skylake ===
The Skylake (D-2100) Xeon D products were released in February 2018. Updates included an increased maximum number of cores, the Skylake microarchitecture, AVX-512 acceleration, and cryptographic acceleration. The second generation also offered increased clock speeds, resulting in greater performance, though the maximum thermal design power also increased. However, the level of AVX-512 support is unclear by product, with higher end products having greater performance than the listed specifications.

Target segment	Cores (threads)	Processor branding and model		Base frequency	Turbo frequency	TDP	Socket	Memory			L3 cache	Release date	Price (USD)
Target segment	Cores (threads)	Processor branding and model		Base frequency	Turbo frequency	TDP	Socket	Type	Frequency	Channel	L3 cache	Release date	Price (USD)
SoC server	18 (36)	Xeon D	D-2191	1.6 GHz	3.0 GHz	86 W	FCBGA 2518	DDR4 up to 512 GB w/ ECC support	2400 MHz	Quad	24.75 MB	Q1 2018	$2407
SoC server	16 (32)	Xeon D	D-2187NT	2.0 GHz	3.0 GHz	110 W	FCBGA 2518	DDR4 up to 512 GB w/ ECC support	2667 MHz	Quad	22 MB	Q1 2018	$1989
SoC server	16 (32)	Xeon D	D-2183IT	2.2 GHz	3.0 GHz	100 W	FCBGA 2518	DDR4 up to 512 GB w/ ECC support	2400 MHz	Quad	22 MB	Q1 2018	$1764
SoC server	14 (28)	Xeon D	D-2177NT	1.9 GHz	3.0 GHz	105 W	FCBGA 2518	DDR4 up to 512 GB w/ ECC support	2667 MHz	Quad	19 MB	Q1 2018	$1443
SoC server	14 (28)	Xeon D	D-2173IT	1.7 GHz	3.0 GHz	70 W	FCBGA 2518	DDR4 up to 512 GB w/ ECC support	2133 MHz	Quad	19 MB	Q1 2018	$1229
SoC server	12 (24)	Xeon D	D-2166NT	2.0 GHz	3.0 GHz	85 W	FCBGA 2518	DDR4 up to 512 GB w/ ECC support	2133 MHz	Quad	17 MB	Q1 2018	$1005
SoC server	12 (24)	Xeon D	D-2163IT	2.1 GHz	3.0 GHz	75 W	FCBGA 2518	DDR4 up to 512 GB w/ ECC support	2133 MHz	Quad	17 MB	Q1 2018	$930
SoC server	12 (24)	Xeon D	D-2161I	2.2 GHz	3.0 GHz	90 W	FCBGA 2518	DDR4 up to 512 GB w/ ECC support	2133 MHz	Quad	16.5 MB	Q1 2018	$962
SoC server	8 (16)	Xeon D	D-2146NT	2.3 GHz	3.0 GHz	80 W	FCBGA 2518	DDR4 up to 512 GB w/ ECC support	2133 MHz	Quad	11 MB	Q1 2018	$641
SoC server	8 (16)	Xeon D	D-2145NT	1.9 GHz	3.0 GHz	65 W	FCBGA 2518	DDR4 up to 512 GB w/ ECC support	2133 MHz	Quad	11 MB	Q1 2018	$502
SoC server	8 (16)	Xeon D	D-2143IT	2.2 GHz	3.0 GHz	65 W	FCBGA 2518	DDR4 up to 512 GB w/ ECC support	2133 MHz	Quad	11 MB	Q1 2018	$566
SoC server	8 (16)	Xeon D	D-2142IT	1.9 GHz	3.0 GHz	65 W	FCBGA 2518	DDR4 up to 512 GB w/ ECC support	2133 MHz	Quad	11 MB	Q1 2018	$438
SoC server	8 (16)	Xeon D	D-2141I	2.2 GHz	3.0 GHz	65 W	FCBGA 2518	DDR4 up to 512 GB w/ ECC support	2133 MHz	Quad	11 MB	Q1 2018	$555
SoC server	4 (8)	Xeon D	D-2123IT	2.2 GHz	3.0 GHz	60 W	FCBGA 2518	DDR4 up to 512 GB w/ ECC support	2400 MHz	Quad	8 MB	Q1 2018	$213

=== Hewitt Lake based ===
Intel announced a second generation of Xeon D products to succeed the Broadwell (D-1500) series, Codenamed Hewitt Lake in February 2019.

Target segment	Cores (threads)	Processor branding and model		Base frequency	Turbo frequency	TDP	Socket	Memory			L3 cache	Release date	Price (USD)
Target segment	Cores (threads)	Processor branding and model		Base frequency	Turbo frequency	TDP	Socket	Type	Frequency	Channel	L3 cache	Release date	Price (USD)
SoC server	8 (16)	Xeon D	D-1653N	2.8 GHz	3.2 GHz	65 W	FCBGA 1667	DDR3/DDR4 up to 128 GB w/ ECC support	2400 MHz	Dual	12 MB	Q2 2019	
SoC server	8 (16)	Xeon D	D-1649N	2.3 GHz	3.0 GHz	45 W	FCBGA 1667	DDR3/DDR4 up to 128 GB w/ ECC support	2133 MHz	Dual	12 MB	Q2 2019	
SoC server	6 (12)	Xeon D	D-1637	2.9 GHz	3.2 GHz	55 W	FCBGA 1667	DDR3/DDR4 up to 128 GB w/ ECC support	2400 MHz	Dual	9 MB	Q2 2019	
SoC server	6 (12)	Xeon D	D-1633N	2.5 GHz	3.2 GHz	45 W	FCBGA 1667	DDR3/DDR4 up to 128 GB w/ ECC support	2133 MHz	Dual	9 MB	Q2 2019	
SoC server	8 (16)	Xeon D	D-1632	1.5 GHz	2.5 GHz	30 W	FCBGA 1667	DDR3/DDR4 up to 128 GB w/ ECC support	2133 MHz	Dual	12 MB	Q2 2019	$401
SoC server	4 (8)	Xeon D	D-1627	2.9 GHz	3.2 GHz	45 W	FCBGA 1667	DDR3/DDR4 up to 128 GB w/ ECC support	2133 MHz	Dual	6 MB	Q2 2019	
SoC server	4 (8)	Xeon D	D-1623N	2.4 GHz	3.2 GHz	35 W	FCBGA 1667	DDR3/DDR4 up to 128 GB w/ ECC support	1866 MHz	Dual	6 MB	Q2 2019	
SoC server	4 (8)	Xeon D	D-1622	2.6 GHz	3.2 GHz	40 W	FCBGA 1667	DDR3/DDR4 up to 128 GB w/ ECC support	2133 MHz	Dual	6 MB	Q2 2019	
SoC server	4 (8)	Xeon D	D-1612	1.5 GHz	2.5 GHz	22 W	FCBGA 1667	DDR3/DDR4 up to 128 GB w/ ECC support	2133 MHz	Dual	6 MB	Q2 2019	$138
SoC server	2 (4)	Xeon D	D-1602	2.5 GHz	3.2 GHz	27 W	FCBGA 1667	DDR3/DDR4 up to 128 GB w/ ECC support	2133 MHz	Dual	3 MB	Q2 2019	

=== Ice Lake-D ===
Intel announced the next generation of Xeon D, codenamed Ice Lake-D in April 2021. Intel official launched the Xeon D D-2700 series and D-1700 series CPUs at MWC 2022. Xeon D D-2800 series and D-1800 series were announced on Dec 14, 2023.

Target segment	Cores (threads)	Processor branding and model		Base frequency	Turbo frequency	TDP	Socket	Memory				L3 cache	Release date	Price (USD)
Target segment	Cores (threads)	Processor branding and model		Base frequency	Turbo frequency	TDP	Socket	Type	Max capacity ^{a}	Frequency	Channels	L3 cache	Release date	Price (USD)
Server	2 (4)	Xeon D	D-1702	1.60 GHz	1.70 GHz	25 W	FCBGA2227	DDR4 w/ECC	256 GB	2400 MHz		5 MB	Q1 2022	$113
Server	4 (8)	Xeon D	D-1712TR	2.00 GHz	3.10 GHz	40 W	FCBGA2227	DDR4 w/ECC	384 GB	2400 MHz		10 MB	Q1 2022	$240
Server	4 (8)	Xeon D	D-1713NT	2.20 GHz	3.50 GHz	45 W	FCBGA2227	DDR4 w/ECC	256 GB	2400 MHz	2	10 MB	Q1 2022	$285
Server	4 (8)	Xeon D	D-1713NTE	2.20 GHz	3.30 GHz	45 W	FCBGA2227	DDR4 w/ECC	256 GB	2400 MHz	2	10 MB	Q1 2022	$296
Server	4 (8)	Xeon D	D-1714	2.30 GHz	3.40 GHz	38 W	FCBGA2227	DDR4 w/ECC	256 GB	2667 MHz		10 MB	Q1 2022	$216
Server	4 (8)	Xeon D	D-1715TER	2.40 GHz	3.50 GHz	50 W	FCBGA2227	DDR4 w/ECC	384 GB	2667 MHz		10 MB	Q1 2022	$285
Server	4 (8)	Xeon D	D-1718T	2.60 GHz	3.50 GHz	46 W	FCBGA2227	DDR4 w/ECC	256 GB	2933 MHz		10 MB	Q1 2022	$274
Server	6 (12)	Xeon D	D-1722NE	1.70 GHz	2.70 GHz	36 W	FCBGA2227	DDR4 w/ECC	256 GB	2400 MHz	2	10 MB	Q1 2022	$365
Server	6 (12)	Xeon D	D-1726	2.90 GHz	3.50 GHz	70 W	FCBGA2227	DDR4 w/ECC	384 GB	2933 MHz	3	10 MB	Q1 2022	$445
Server	8 (16)	Xeon D	D-1732TE	1.90 GHz	3.00 GHz	52 W	FCBGA2227	DDR4 w/ECC	384 GB	2667 MHz		15 MB	Q1 2022	$663
Server	8 (16)	Xeon D	D-1733NT	2.00 GHz	3.10 GHz	53 W	FCBGA2227	DDR4 w/ECC	256 GB	2400 MHz	2	15 MB	Q1 2022	$720
Server	8 (16)	Xeon D	D-1734NT	2.00 GHz	3.10 GHz	50 W	FCBGA2227	DDR4 w/ECC	256 GB	2667 MHz	2	15 MB	Q1 2022	$686
Server	8 (16)	Xeon D	D-1735TR	2.20 GHz	3.40 GHz	59 W	FCBGA2227	DDR4 w/ECC	384 GB	2933 MHz		15 MB	Q1 2022	
Server	8 (16)	Xeon D	D-1736	2.30 GHz	3.40 GHz	55 W	FCBGA2227	DDR4 w/ECC	256 GB	2933 MHz		15 MB	Q1 2022	$606
Server	8 (16)	Xeon D	D-1736NT	2.70 GHz	3.50 GHz	67 W	FCBGA2227	DDR4 w/ECC	256 GB	2667 MHz	2	15 MB	Q1 2022	$915
Server	8 (16)	Xeon D	D-1739	3.00 GHz	3.50 GHz	83 W	FCBGA2227	DDR4 w/ECC	384 GB	2933 MHz		15 MB	Q1 2022	$743
Server	10 (20)	Xeon D	D-1746TER	2.00 GHz	3.10 GHz	67 W	FCBGA2227	DDR4 w/ECC	384 GB	2667 MHz		15 MB	Q1 2022	$972
Server	10 (20)	Xeon D	D-1747NTE	2.50 GHz	3.50 GHz	80 W	FCBGA2227	DDR4 w/ECC	384 GB	2933 MHz	3	15 MB	Q1 2022	$1201
Server	10 (20)	Xeon D	D-1748TE	2.30 GHz	3.40 GHz	65 W	FCBGA2227	DDR4 w/ECC	256 GB	2400 MHz	2	15 MB	Q1 2022	$972
Server	10 (20)	Xeon D	D-1749NT	3.00 GHz	3.50 GHz	90 W	FCBGA2227	DDR4 w/ECC	256 GB	2667 MHz	2	15 MB	Q1 2022	$1144
Server	4 (8)	Xeon D	D-2712T	1.90 GHz	3.00 GHz	65 W	FCBGA2579	DDR4 w/ECC	1 TB	2667 MHz	4	15 MB	Q1 2022	$342
Server	8 (16)	Xeon D	D-2733NT	2.10 GHz	3.20 GHz	80 W	FCBGA2579	DDR4 w/ECC	1 TB	2667 MHz	4	15 MB	Q1 2022	$800
Server	8 (16)	Xeon D	D-2738	2.50 GHz	3.50 GHz	88 W	FCBGA2579	DDR4 w/ECC	1 TB	2933 MHz	4	15 MB	Q1 2022	$686
Server	12 (24)	Xeon D	D-2752NTE	1.90 GHz	3.00 GHz	84 W	FCBGA2579	DDR4 w/ECC	1 TB	2667 MHz	4	20 MB	Q1 2022	$1144
Server	12 (24)	Xeon D	D-2752TER	1.80 GHz	2.80 GHz	77 W	FCBGA2579	DDR4 w/ECC	1 TB	2667 MHz	4	20 MB	Q1 2022	$1041
Server	12 (24)	Xeon D	D-2753NT	2.00 GHz	3.10 GHz	87 W	FCBGA2579	DDR4 w/ECC	1 TB	2667 MHz	4	20 MB	Q1 2022	1075
Server	14 (28)	Xeon D	D-2766NT	2.00 GHz	3.10 GHz	97 W	FCBGA2579	DDR4 w/ECC	1 TB	2667 MHz	4	20 MB	Q1 2022	$1201
Server	16 (32)	Xeon D	D-2775TE	2.00 GHz	3.10 GHz	100 W	FCBGA2579	DDR4 w/ECC	1 TB	2933 MHz	4	25 MB	Q1 2022	$1716
Server	16 (32)	Xeon D	D-2776NT	2.10 GHz	3.20 GHz	117 W	FCBGA2579	DDR4 w/ECC	1 TB	2933 MHz	4	25 MB	Q1 2022	$1716
Server	16 (32)	Xeon D	D-2779	2.50 GHz	3.40 GHz	126 W	FCBGA2579	DDR4 w/ECC	1 TB	3200 MHz	4	25 MB	Q1 2022	$1499
Server	18 (36)	Xeon D	D-2786NTE	2.10 GHz	3.10 GHz	118 W	FCBGA2579	DDR4 w/ECC	1 TB	2933 MHz	4	27.5 MB	Q1 2022	$2060
Server	20 (40)	Xeon D	D-2795NT	2.00 GHz	3.10 GHz	110 W	FCBGA2579	DDR4 w/ECC	1 TB	2933 MHz	4	30 MB	Q1 2022	$2082
Server	20 (40)	Xeon D	D-2796NT	2.00 GHz	3.10 GHz	120 W	FCBGA2579	DDR4 w/ECC	1 TB	2933 MHz	4	30 MB	Q1 2022	$2082
Server	20 (40)	Xeon D	D-2796TE	2.00 GHz	3.10 GHz	118 W	FCBGA2579	DDR4 w/ECC	1 TB	2933 MHz	4	30 MB	Q1 2022	$2060
Server	20 (40)	Xeon D	D-2798NT	2.10 GHz	3.10 GHz	125 W	FCBGA2579	DDR4 w/ECC	1 TB	3200 MHz	4	30 MB	Q1 2022	$2116
Server	20 (40)	Xeon D	D-2799	2.40 GHz	3.40 GHz	129 W	FCBGA2579	DDR4 w/ECC	1 TB	3200 MHz	4	30 MB	Q1 2022	$1933

^a Max capacity dependent on memory type
