= AMX International AMX =

Brazilian/Italian ground-attack aircraft

AMX
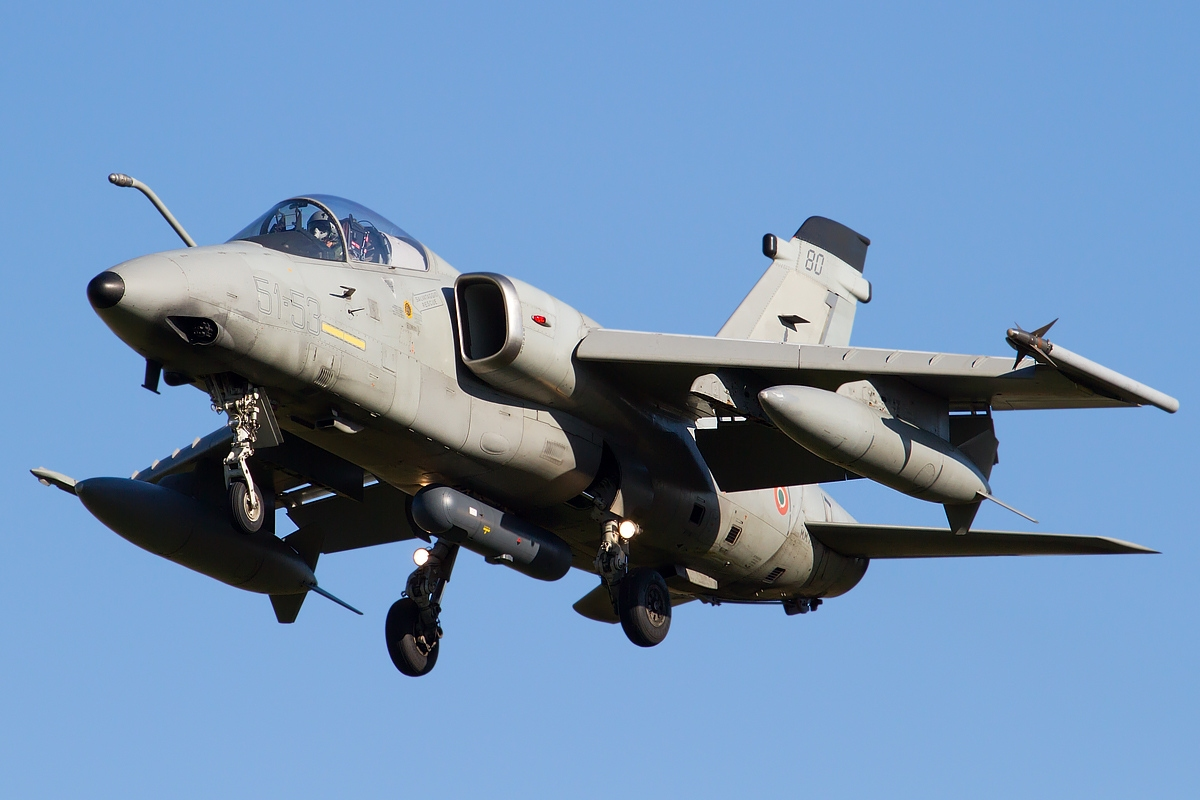
- An AMX of the Italian Air Force

General information
- Type: Ground-attack aircraft
- National origin: Italy / Brazil
- Manufacturer: AMX International
- Status: Active service
- Primary users: Italian Air Force (historical) Brazilian Air Force
- Number built: 230

History
- Manufactured: 1986–1999
- Introduction date: 1989
- First flight: 15 May 1984
- Retired: 2024 (Italy)

The AMX International AMX is a ground-attack aircraft jointly developed by Brazil and Italy, designated A-11 Ghibli by the Italian Air Force and A-1 by the Brazilian Air Force. The Italian name, "Ghibli", is taken from the hot dry wind of the Libyan Desert.

During the early 1970s, Italian manufacturer Aermacchi conducted a design study on a prospective light ground-attack aircraft, which was given the designation of MB-340. In 1977, the Italian Air Force issued a requirement for 187 new-build strike fighters to replace its existing Aeritalia G.91 in the close air support role.

In 1978, both Aeritalia and Aermacchi joined to engage on a single aircraft. During October of the same year, the Rolls Royce “Spey” was chosen by the Aeronautica Militare, and the two companies started the real development of the AMX that was widely based on the Aeritalia Model 3-20 project.

In 1980, the Brazilian government announced that they intended to participate in the program in order to provide a replacement for the Aermacchi MB-326 used by the Brazilian Air Force. As a result of a memorandum between Italy and Brazil for the aircraft's joint development in 1981, AMX International, an Italian-Brazilian joint venture, was formed to develop, manufacture, and market the aircraft.

In 2024 the last Italian Air Force squadron to operate the AMX removed the jet from service in a ceremony, marking the end of the AMX in Italian service.

== Development ==
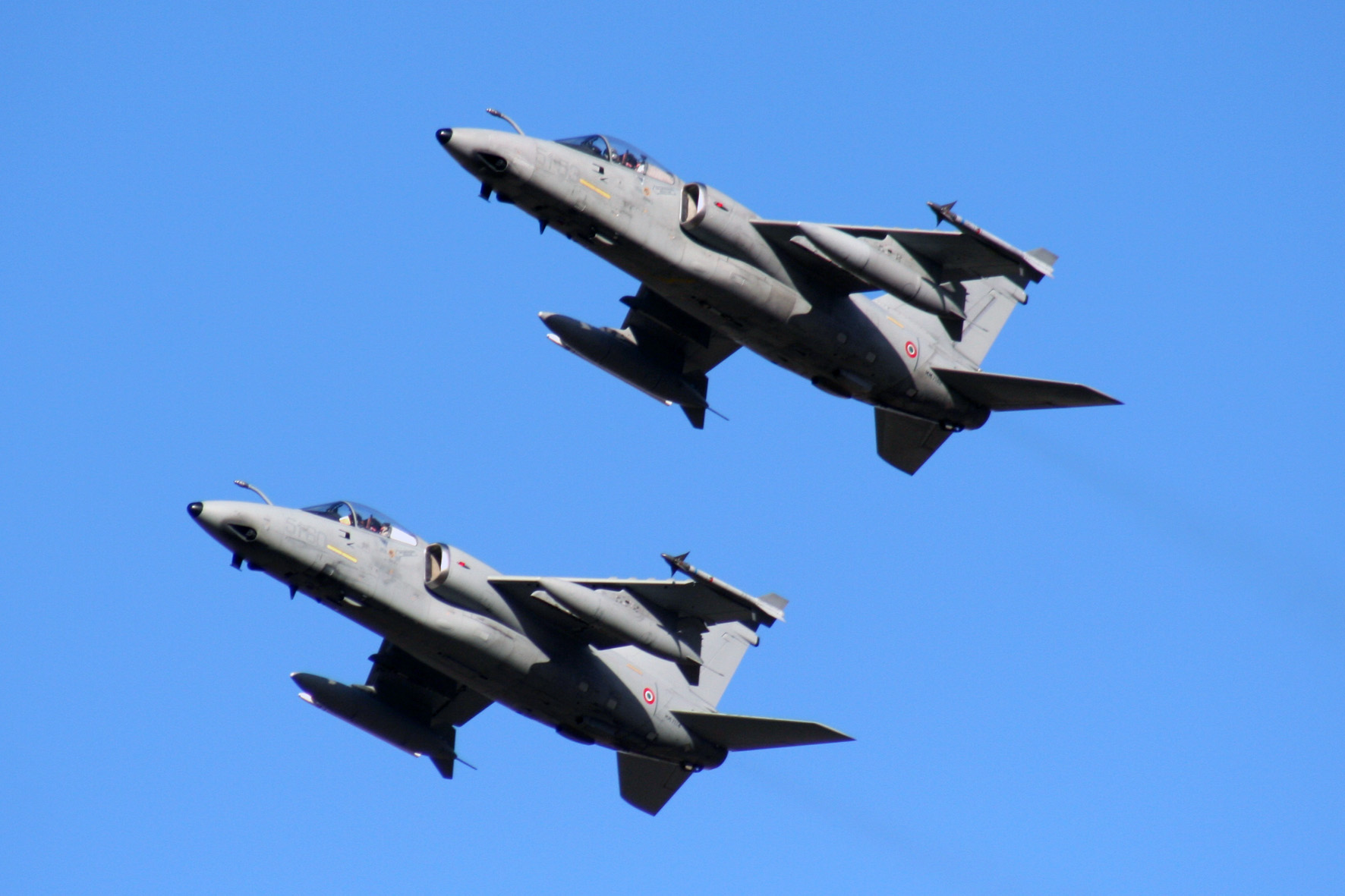
A pair of AMXs in flight, 2010

During early 1977, the Italian Air Force issued a requirement for 187 new-build strike fighters, which were to replace its existing Aeritalia G.91 in the close air support and reconnaissance missions, as well as the Lockheed RF-104G Starfighter also being used in the reconnaissance role. Rather than competing for the contract, Aeritalia (now Alenia Aeronautica) and Aermacchi agreed to produce a joint proposal for the requirement, as both firms had been considering the development of a similar class of aircraft for some years. During the early 1970s, Aermacchi conducted work on a design study for such a light ground attack aircraft under the designation of MB-340. In April 1978, development work on the joint venture formally commenced.

In 1978, both Aeritalia and Aermacchi joined to engage on a single aircraft. During October of the same year the Rolls Royce “Spey” was chosen by the Aeronautica Militare and the two companies started the real development of the AMX that was widely based on the early 1970s Aeritalia Model 3-20 project.

During 1980, the Brazilian government announced that they intended to participate in the program in order to provide a replacement for the Aermacchi MB-326. In July 1981, the Italian and Brazilian governments agreed on joint requirements for the aircraft, and Embraer was invited to join the industrial partnership. An agreement was also struck to divide AMX manufacturing between the partners; for each production aircraft, Aeritalia manufactured 46.5 per cent of the components (central fuselage, stabilisers and rudders), Aermacchi produced 22.8 per cent (front fuselage and tail cone), and Embraer performed 29.7 per cent of the work (wing, air intakes, pylons and drop tanks). There was no duplication of work, each component of the aircraft was built at one source only. The planned requirements were 187 aircraft for Italy and 100 for Brazil. Final deliveries were 136 aircraft for the Italian Air Force (110 AMX & 26 AMX-T) and 94 airplanes for the Brazilian Air Force (79 AMX & 15 AMX-T) for a total of 230 planes between the two countries.

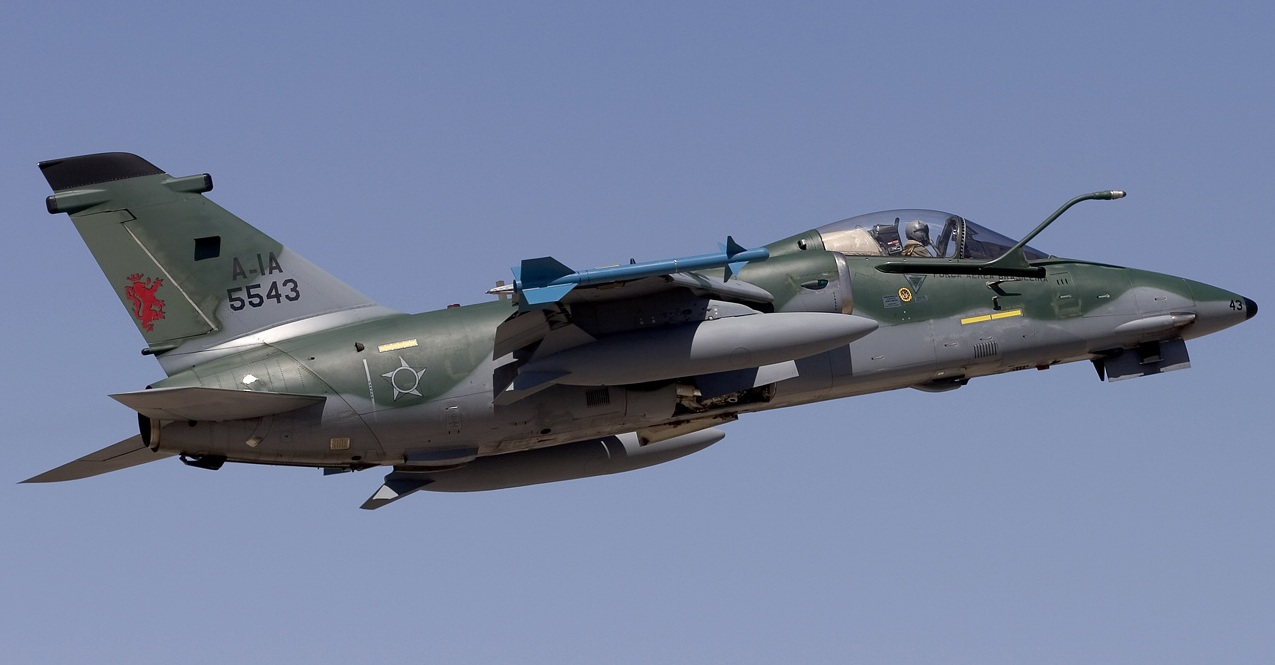
Brazilian Air Force A-1A at Mendoza, Argentina, 2005

In the early stages of development, various different powerplants and engine configurations were studied to power the type; both twin-engine and single-engine approaches were considered. The use of US-sourced engines had been promptly discounted to avoid any potential restrictions on export sales of the overall aircraft. Amongst the engines examined were the Turbo-Union RB199 (as used by the larger Panavia Tornado), the Rolls-Royce Turbomeca Adour, Rolls-Royce Viper, and the Rolls-Royce Spey engine. In 1978, the Spey 807 model, which featured several additional improvements, was selected to power the new aircraft.

Key features that were reportedly emphasised in the design process of the new aircraft were accessibility and survivability; the AMX had to be able to sustain a single failure to any onboard system without any performance degradation. To achieve this, key systems are duplicated and vital systems are protected; the use of cockpit armor was considered but ultimately discounted due to the expense involved. The detailed definition phase of the project was completed in March 1980.

A total of seven flight-capable prototypes were produced for the test program, three by Aeritalia, two by Aermacchi, and two by Embraer, as well as two static airframes. The first prototype, assembled in Italy, made its maiden flight on 15 May 1984. This first aircraft was lost on its fifth flight in an accident, resulting in the death of its pilot. Aside from this early loss, testing progressed without further incident. The first Brazilian-assembled prototype made its first flight on 16 October 1985. On 11 May 1988, the first production aircraft performed its first flight. Deliveries of production aircraft to Italy began in 1988, the first units were delivered to the Brazilian Air Force during the following year. On 14 March 1990, the prototype two-seat AMX made its first flight.

== Design ==
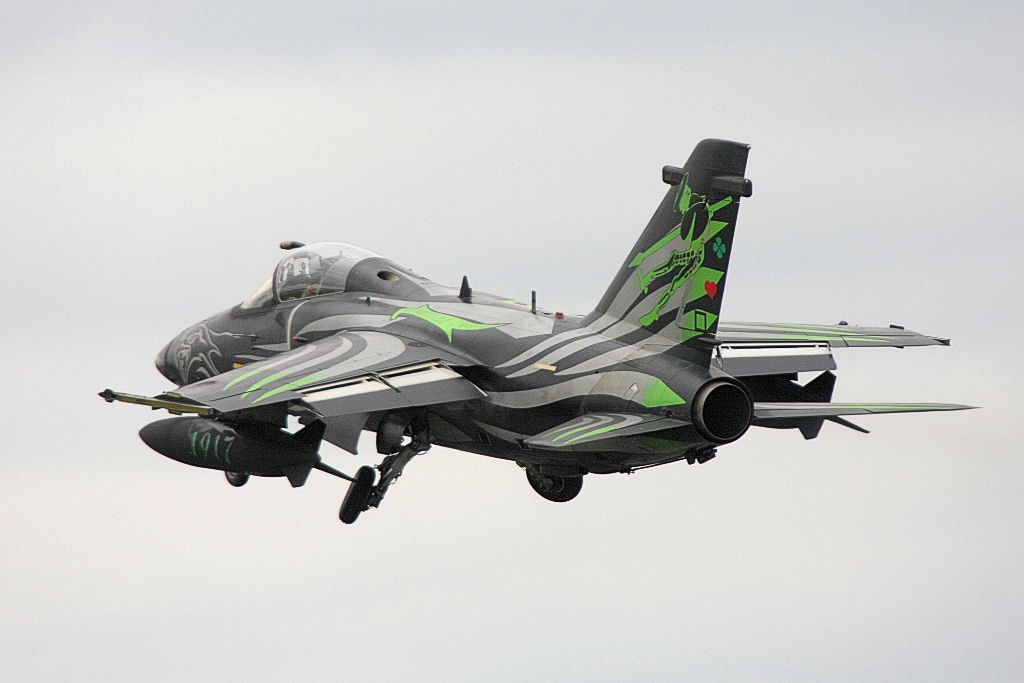
An AMX performing a display at the 2008 Royal International Air Tattoo

The AMX is a conventional shoulder-winged monoplane. It is composed primarily of aluminium and manufactured using traditional construction methods, however elements such as the tail fin and elevators use carbon fibre composite materials. For its size, a large proportion of the AMX's internal space is allocated to avionics and onboard computer systems. Both the navigation and attack systems are computerized. For accessibility and ease of maintenance, all avionics are installed directly in bays beneath the cockpit in a manner in which they can be worked upon at ground level without the use of support platforms.

Drawing on experience from the Panavia Tornado, the AMX is equipped with a hybrid flight control system; a fly-by-wire control system is employed to operate flight control surfaces such as the spoilers, rudder and variable incidence tailplane, while the ailerons and elevators are actuated via a dual-redundant hydraulic system. Manual reversion is provided for the ailerons, elevator and rudder to allow the aircraft to be flown even in the event of complete hydraulic failure; either control system can act independent of the other. The wing is fitted with both leading edge slats and trailing edge flaps and overwing spoilers ahead of the flaps. The spoilers can function as airbrakes and to negate lift; improving take-off and landing performance as well as manoeuvrability during flight.

A single Rolls-Royce Spey turbofan engine serves as the AMX's powerplant. During the aircraft's development, the Spey was heavier and less modern than some of the available alternatives, but it was considered to be reliable, relatively cheap and was free of export restrictions that would be imposed by using American engines. The Spey engine also enabled for the use of a simplified round-lipped inlet design. The rear fuselage is detachable in order to gain access to the engine. Separate consortia in both Brazil and Italy manufactured the Spey for the AMX. Unusual for a strike aircraft of the era, no attempt was made to develop the aircraft to fly at supersonic speeds.

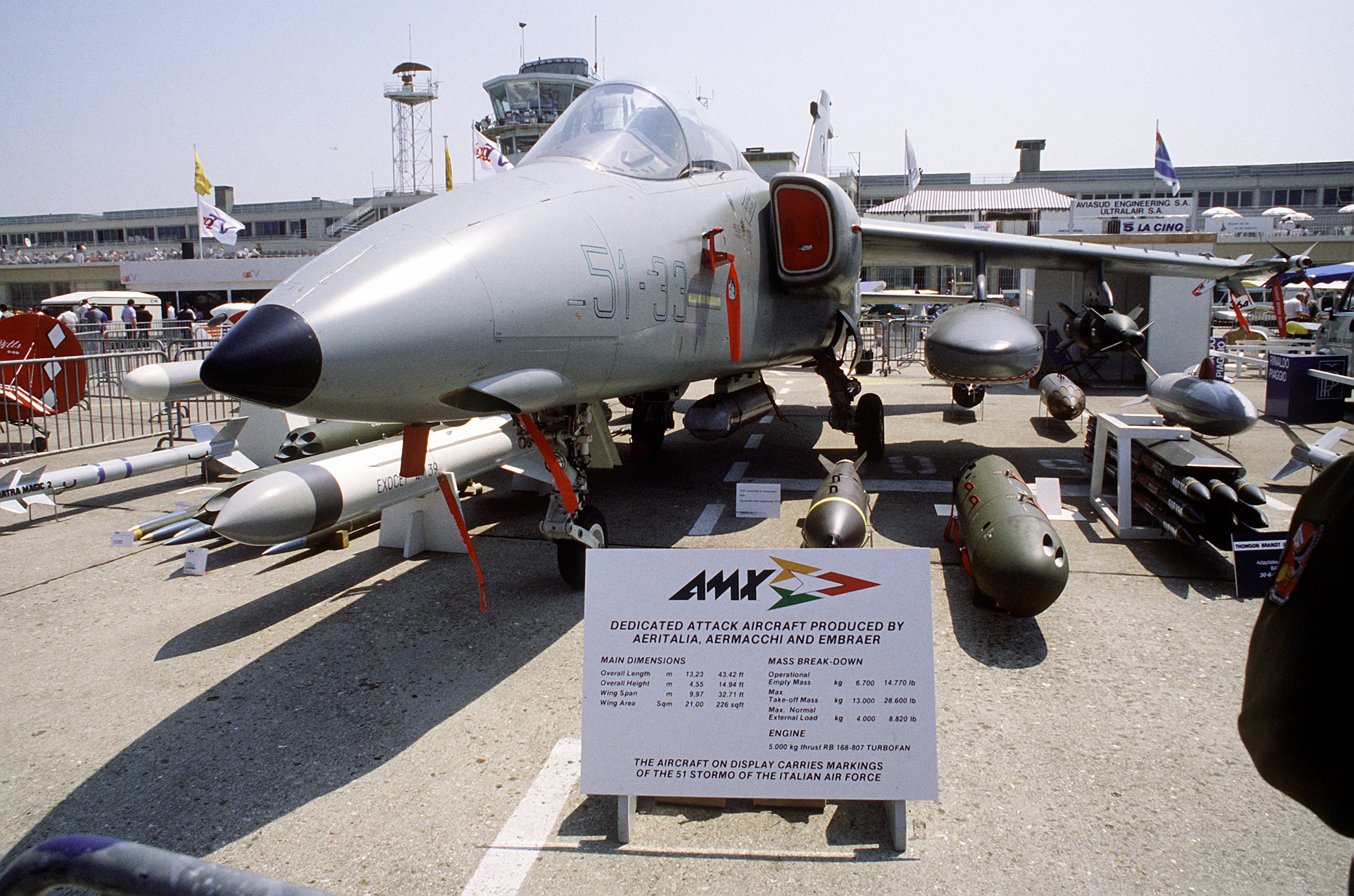
An AMX and several munitions on display at the Paris Air Show, 1989

Brazilian and Italian aircraft differ considerably in their avionics, Italian aircraft being equipped with various NATO systems which were considered redundant in the South American theatre. AMXs in Brazilian service are often fitted with one of three pallet-mounted sensor packages, which contain various vertical, oblique, and forward-facing cameras, for performing the aircraft's secondary aerial reconnaissance role. A simple ranging radar is equipped for targeting purposes; however, the specific radar also differs between the two operators. The flight system employs a GE Avionics flight control computer. Extensive electronic countermeasures (ECM) are fitted to protect the aircraft, including passive receiver antenna on the tailfin and an active jammer pod that is typically mounted on one of the aircraft's hardpoints.

Various munitions could be mounted on the one centerline and four under-wing hardpoints, including bombs, missiles and rockets; payloads of up to 900 kg (2,000 lb) may be carried upon the centerline and the two innermost under-wing pylons, while the outer pylons can carry up to 500 kg (1,000 lb). All four of the under-wing hardpoints are plumbed for drop tanks to extend the aircraft's range, Italian aircraft are also fitted with a fixed aerial refueling probe. Optical reconnaissance pods can be carried externally on the centerline hardpoint. Wingtip rails are provided for infrared guided air-to-air missiles such as the AIM-9 Sidewinder and MAA-1 Piranha. Italian aircraft are fitted with an M61 Vulcan 20 mm rotary cannon on the port side of the lower fuselage. The United States denied the sale of the M61 to Brazil, thus its AMXs are instead fitted with two 30 mm DEFA 554 revolver cannons.

== Operational history ==
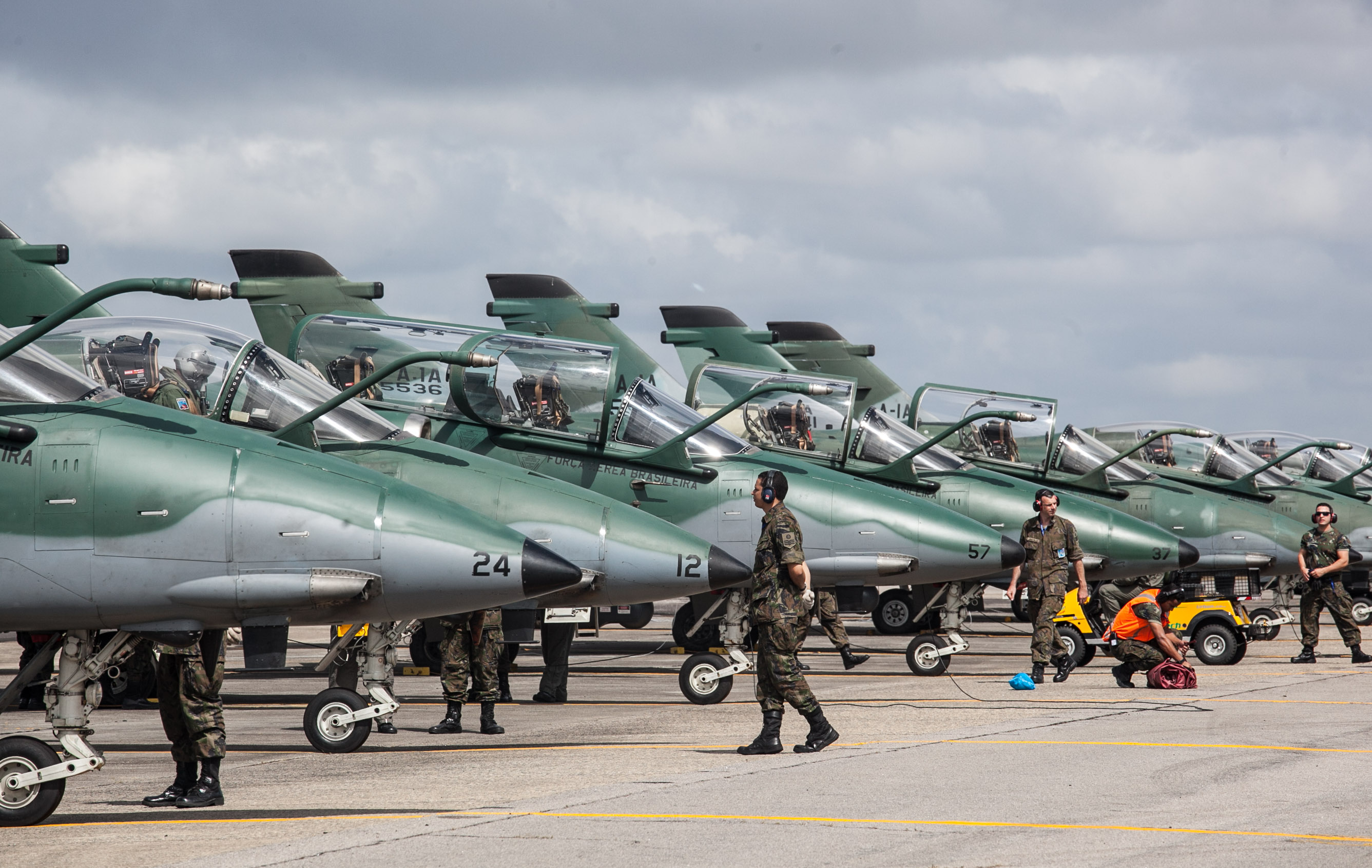
Brazilian AMX A-1 fighter bombers

The first operational squadron of the Italian air force, the 103° Gruppo of 51° Stormo formed in November 1989, with the first Italian unit also forming in 1989. Both the Italian and Brazilian AMX fleets were grounded in February 1992, following the crash of an Italian AMX due to engine failure. Operations were allowed to restart in May of that year, following modification of the engines.

Italy assigned six AMXs from 103° Gruppo to operations over Bosnia in 1995 as part of Operation Deny Flight, which was followed by a similar deployment in support of the IFOR peacekeepers in Bosnia. This deployment was interrupted by another grounding, again due to engine failure, between January and March 1996. Italian AMX aircraft were used in 1999 in the Kosovo war. Instead of using unguided or more traditional laser-guided bombs, the Italian Air Force used dozens of Mk 82 bombs fitted with Opher Israeli guidance kits, effectively converting the "dumb" bombs into an infrared-guided bomb.

In the late 1990s, AMX International was considering a major engine refit; a non-afterburning variant of the Eurojet EJ200 was proposed, with considerably more thrust than the existing powerplant. In 2005, the Italian Air Force launched an upgrade programme (ACOL Aggionamento Capacità Operative e Logistiche – Operational and Logistical Capability Upgrade) for 55 of its AMXs, adding a new laser INS, new cockpit displays and allowing the aircraft to drop Joint Direct Attack Munition guided bombs. In August 2007, Embraer began a major midlife upgrade programme and modernisation of 53 Brazilian Air Force AMX A-1s, focusing on avionics systems and new armament additions; the programme is estimated to have extended the lifespan of the fleet beyond 2027.

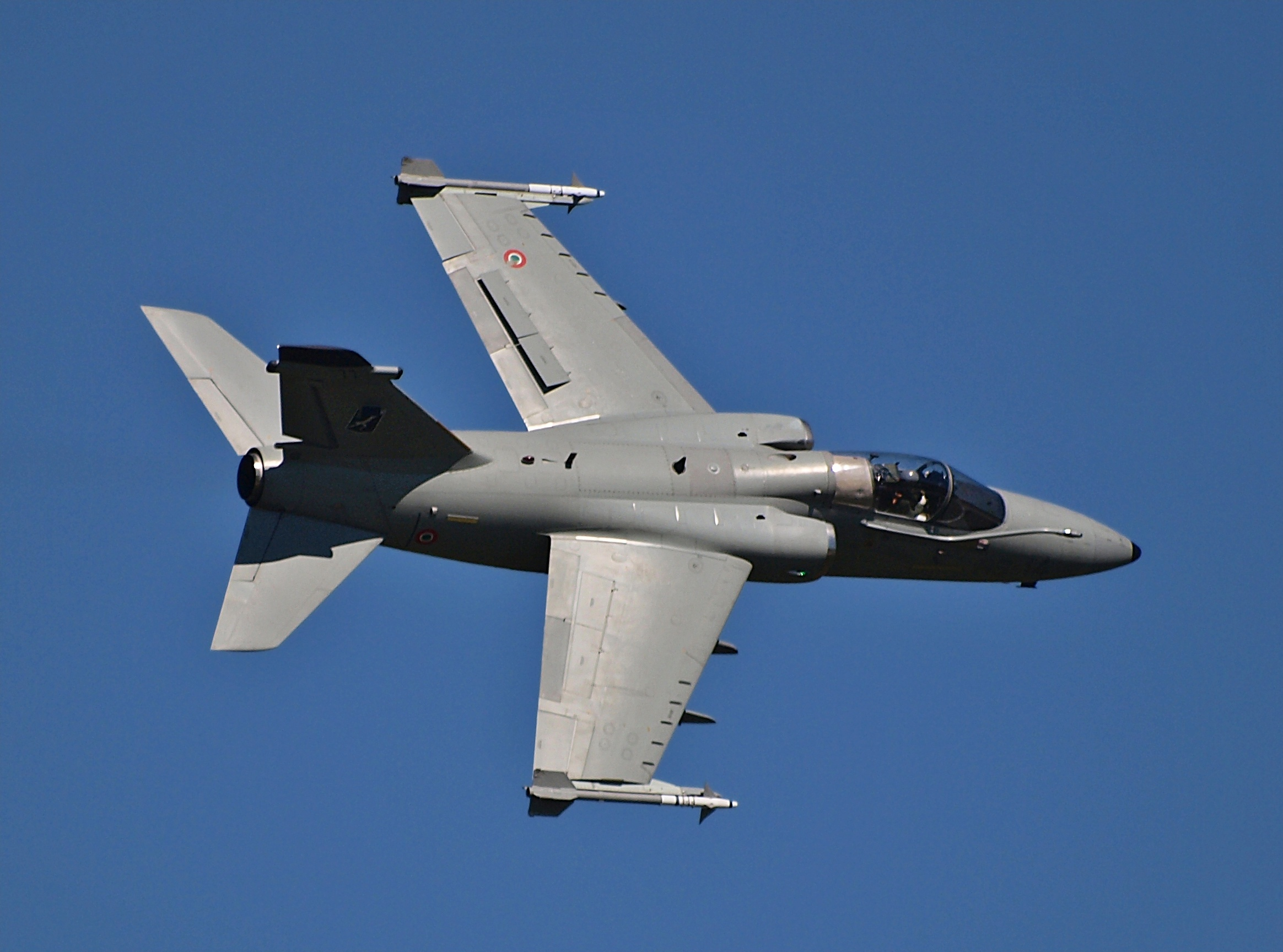
Italian Air Force AMX, 2010

Starting in November 2009, four Italian AMXs were deployed overseas for operations in Afghanistan, replacing the same number of Italian Tornado IDS in the reconnaissance role. Of particular note is the aircraft's ability to share digital electro-optical and infrared sensor information with ground troops in real time, providing valuable reconnaissance information and helping to minimise threat exposure. By the end of 2010 over 700 combat missions had been flown in the Afghan theatre. On 28 May 2014, the AMX performed its last combat sortie in the Afghan theatre, and on 20 June 2014, all remaining AMXs were withdrawn from Afghanistan.

In 2011, Italian AMX aircraft were employed during the 2011 military intervention in Libya. Italian military aircraft deployed 710 guided bombs and missiles during sorties: Italian Air Force Tornados and AMX fighter bombers deployed 550 bombs and missiles, while Navy AV-8Bs deployed 160 guided bombs. The conflict saw the first use by AMX aircraft of Litening targeting pods paired with Paveway and JDAM guided bombs. In early 2016, due to the declining stability of Libya, Italy opted to station additional aircraft, including four AMX fighters, at Bassi Airbase, Trapani, Sicily.

In March 2012, the Philippines were reportedly holding negotiations with Italy for the possible procurement of used AMX aircraft; however, on 28 March 2014, the Philippines' Department of National Defense signed a contract for 12 FA-50 light attack aircraft worth P18.9 billion (US$421.12 million).

The Italian Air Force held a retirement ceremony on 5 April 2024 at Istrana Air Base in northern Italy.

== Variants ==
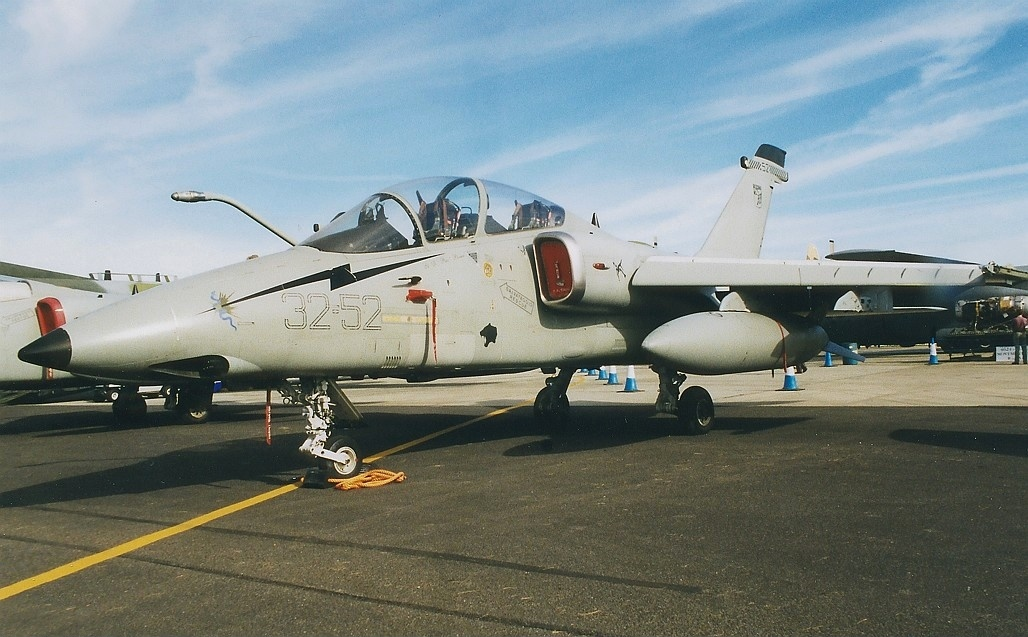
Italian AMX at RAF Fairford, England, 1998

External images
- Head-on view of an AMX
- AMX in wrap-around camouflage
- Laiden AMX taking off
- Inside view of cockpit
- AMX in special colour scheme

AMX-T

In 1986, development of a two-seat advanced trainer variant was undertaken. This was intended to provide trainee pilots with experience on fast jets, while still retaining the single-seater's attack capabilities. First flying in 1990, the AMX-T equipped both the Italian and Brazilian air forces.

AMX-ATA

The AMX Advanced Trainer Attack (AMX-ATA) is a new AMX two-seater multi-mission attack fighter developed for combat roles and advanced training. The AMX-ATA incorporates new sensors, a forward-looking infrared helmet-mounted display, a new multi-mode radar for air-to-air and air-to-surface capability, and new weapons systems including anti-ship missiles and medium-range missiles. The Venezuelan Air Force ordered eight AMX-ATA in 1999 for the advanced trainer and attack aircraft role, but the US Congress vetoed the sale because the aircraft systems include US technology.

AMX-R (RA-1)

An AMX variant designed for reconnaissance missions. Various reconnaissance pallets can be fitted; used by the Brazilian Air Force.

A-1M

The product of a Brazilian upgrade program of their A-1s; significant features include a Mectron SCP-01 Scipio radar, Embraer BR2 data link, FLIR Systems navigation equipment, Elbit INS/GPS/databus, the adoption of a glass cockpit, a new OBOGS system and HMD DASH IV.

A-11A

Italian military designation for the AMX from 2012.

TA-11A

Italian military designation for the AMX-T from 2012.

A-11B

Italian military designation for the AMX ACOL from 2012.

TA-11B

Italian military designation for the AMX-T ACOL from 2012.

== Operators ==
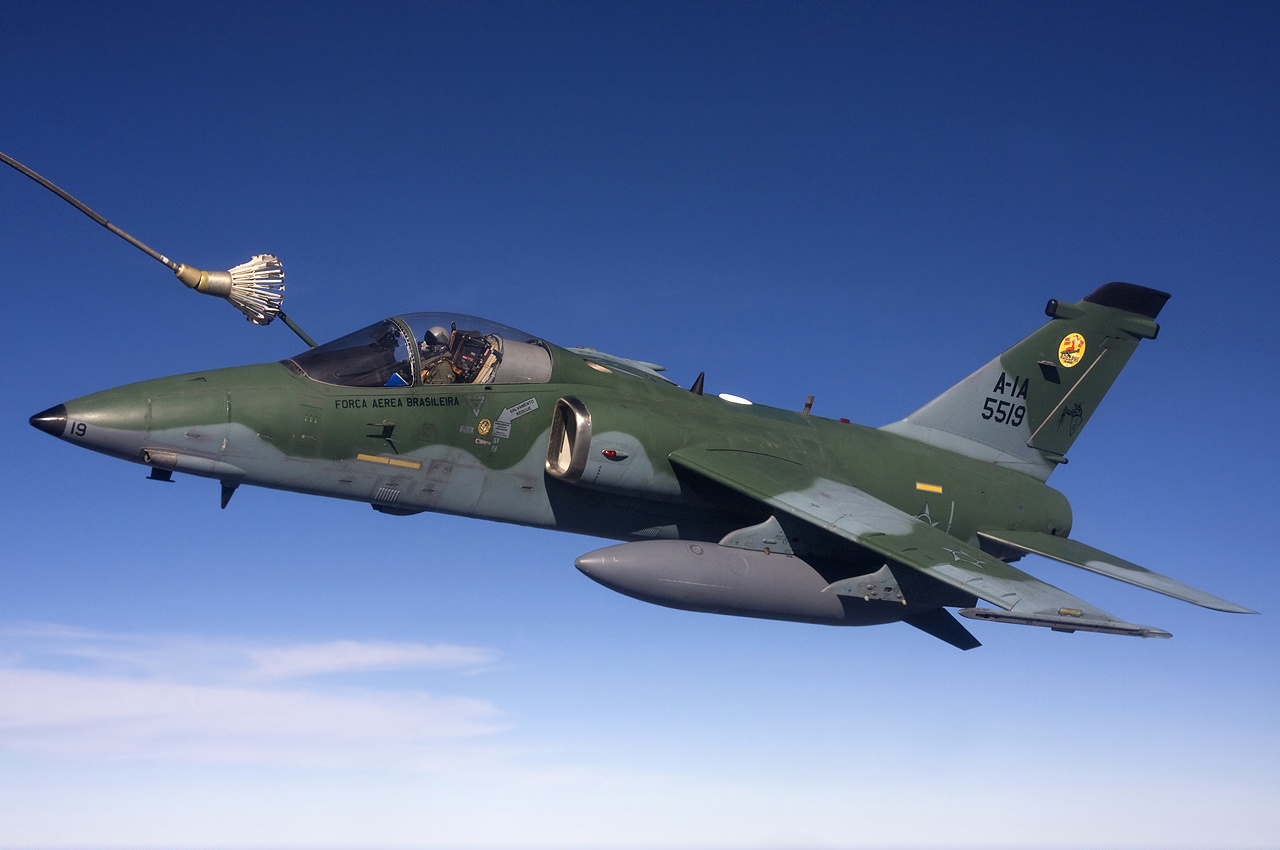
A Brazilian Air Force AMX conducts an in-flight air refueling

Brazil

- Brazilian Air Force operated 24 AMX fighters until 2024. The fleet was phased out by 2025, being replaced by the JAS 39E/F Gripen.
  - 1 Esquadrão/16 Grupo de Aviação Esquadrão Adelphi, Santa Cruz Air Base - disbanded in December 2016 in anticipation of future reactivation with the F-39 Gripen E. Aircraft transferred to Santa Maria Air Base.
  - 1 Esquadrão/10 Grupo de Aviação Esquadrão Poker, Santa Maria Air Base
  - 3 Esquadrão/10 Grupo de aviação Esquadrão Centauro, Santa Maria Air Base

=== Former operators ===
Italy

- Italian Air Force as of 2024, operates 35 A-11Bs (originally AMX ACOL) and 5 TA-11Bs (originally AMX-T ACOL) out of four prototypes, 110 one-seaters and 26 two-seaters delivered.
  - 101 Gruppo, 51 Stormo (Training Squadron - 11 TA-11Bs) – disbanded
  - 103 Gruppo, 51 Stormo (Ground Attack Squadron - 18 A-11Bs) – disbanded
  - 132 Gruppo, 51 Stormo (Ground Attack Reconnaissance Squadron - 17 A-11Bs with Rafael RecceLite pod capability)

== Aircraft on display ==
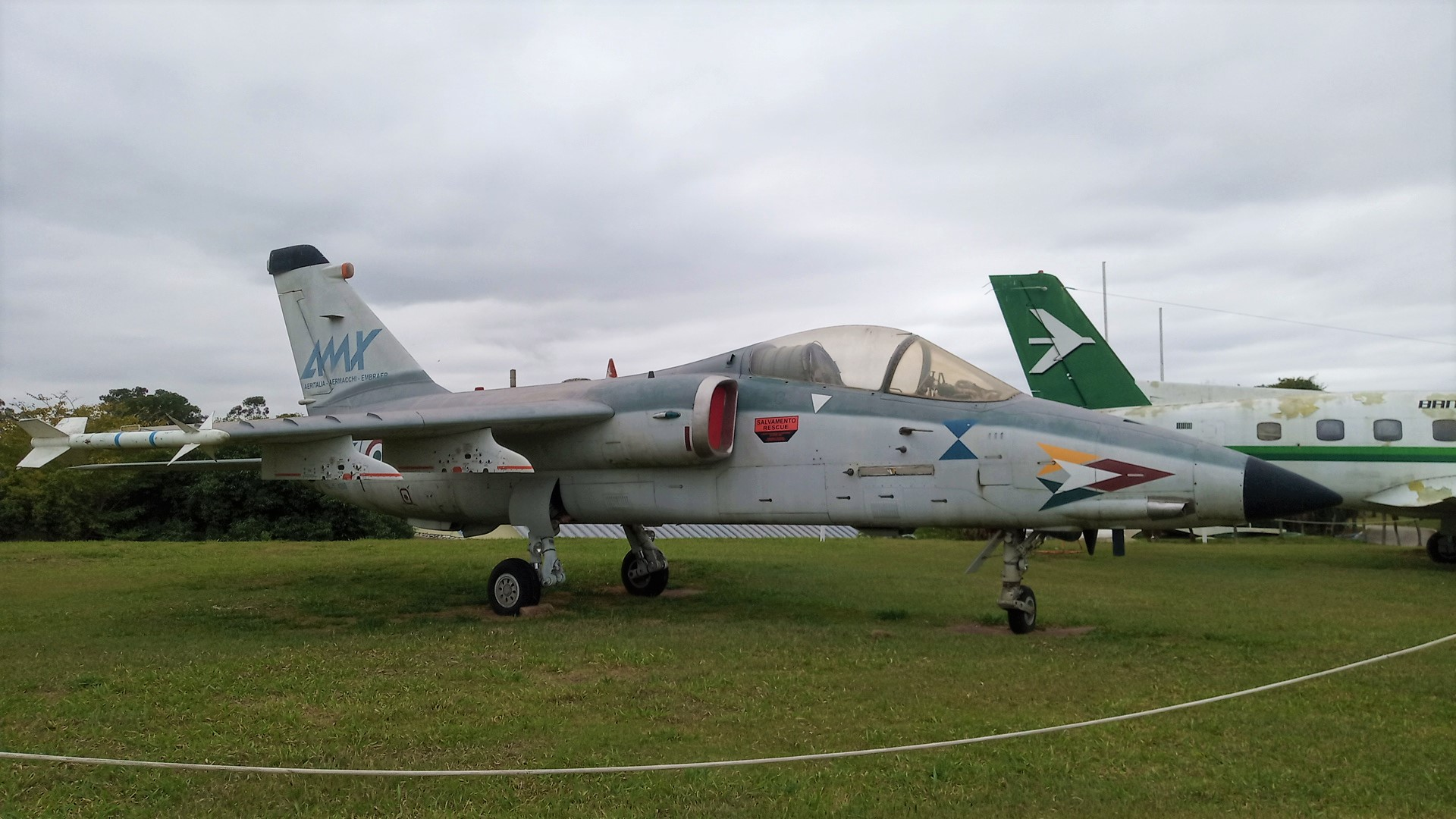
AMX A-1 first prototype at the Memorial Aeroespacial Brasileiro, in São José dos Campos, Brazil

- A retired Italian Air Force AMX is displayed on a pedestal in front of the Thales Alenia Space plant in Turin.
- A retired Italian Air Force AMX (MM7125) is on display at the Italian Air Force Museum, located on the former Vigna di Valle Air Base in Bracciano near Rome.
- Development prototype #5, (Italian Air Force MMX599) is on display at the Volandia Park and Flight Museum located in Somma Lombardo and adjacent to the Milan-Malpensa Airport
- The first prototype built in Brazil (FAB4200) is displayed on an open museum called Memorial Aeroespacial Brasileiro in São José dos Campos.
- The second prototype built in Brazil (FAB4201) is displayed at Museu Aeroespacial in Rio de Janeiro.
- A decommissioned Brazilian Air Force AMX (FAB5530) is displayed at "Praça do Avião" square, which is located close to Galeão International Airport on Governador Island in Rio de Janeiro.
- A Brazilian Air Force AMX (FAB5524) is displayed at Museu EPCAR in Guaramiranga.
- A Brazilian Air Force AMX (FAB5528) is on static display at the Colégio Militar de Curitiba in Curitiba, Paraná.
- A Brazilian Air Force AMX-T (FAB5650) is on static display at Escola de Especialistas da Aeronáutica (EEAR) in Guaratinguetá.

== Specifications (AMX) ==
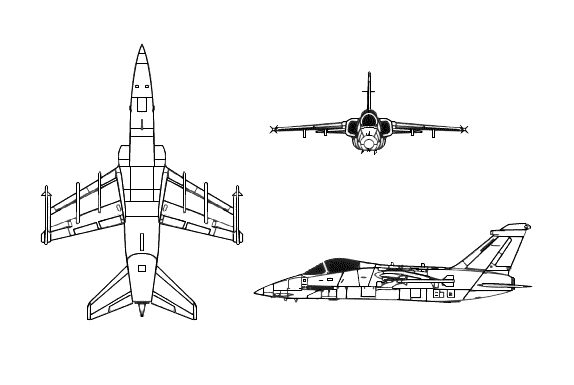
Orthographically projected diagram of the AMX

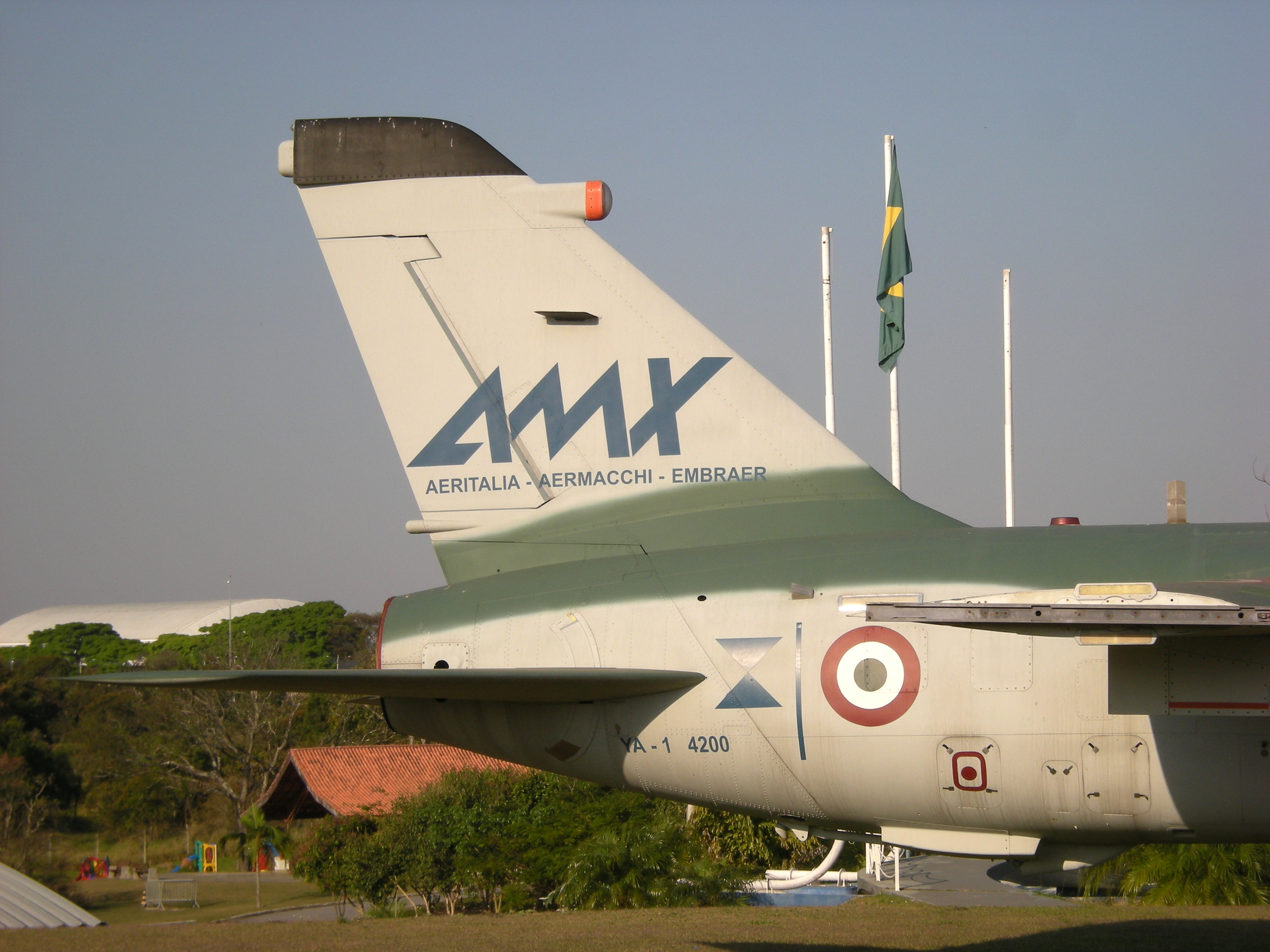
A close-up of the tailfin and rear fuselage of an AMX

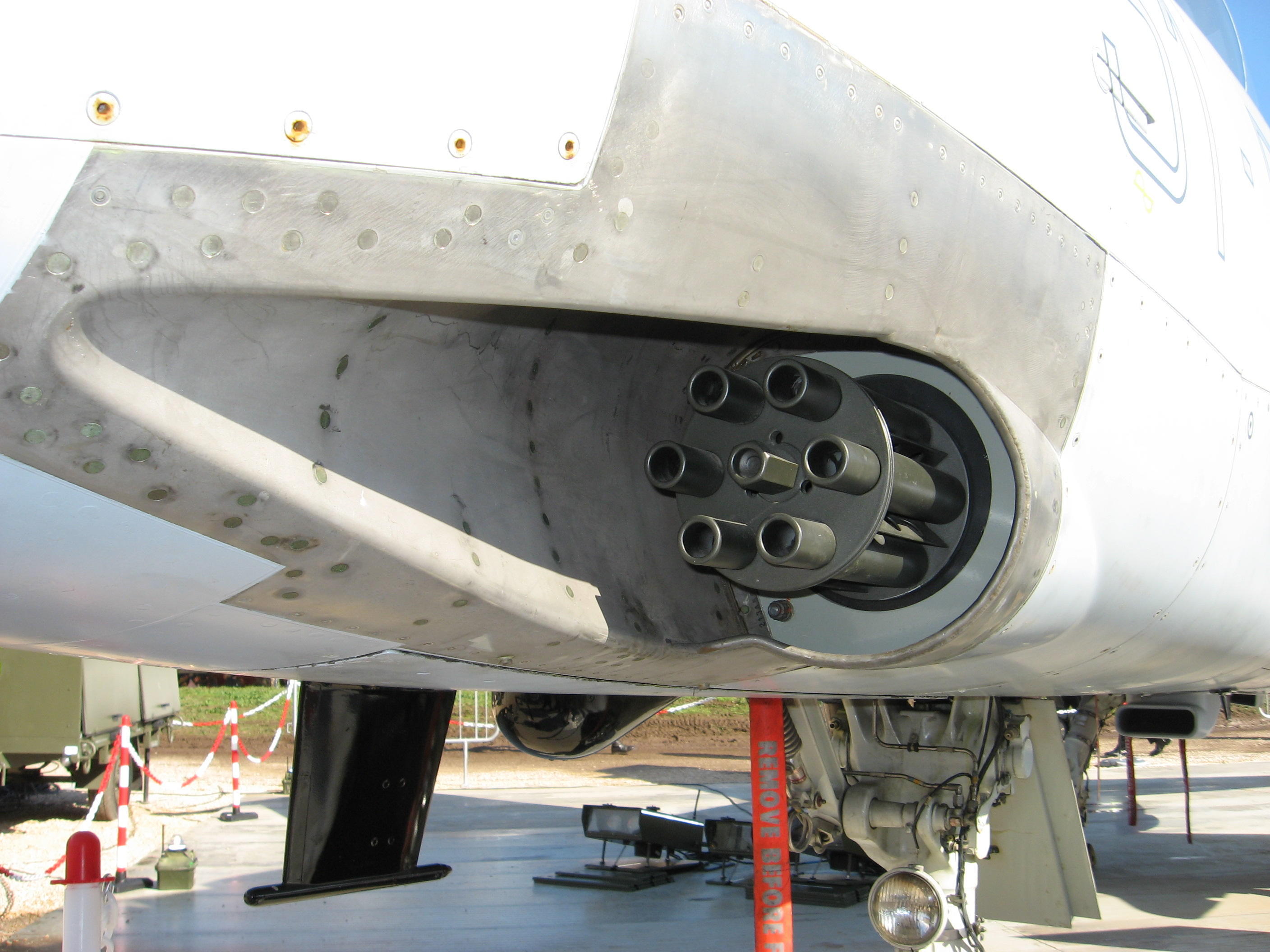
M61 Vulcan cannon on the underside of an Italian AMX

Data from Jane's All The World's Aircraft 1993–94, Jet Bombers

General characteristics

- Crew: 1
- Length: 13.23 m (43 ft 5 in)
- Wingspan: 8.87 m (29 ft 1 in)
- Height: 4.55 m (14 ft 11 in)
- Wing area: 21 m^{2} (230 sq ft)
- Empty weight: 6,700 kg (14,771 lb)
- Gross weight: 10,750 kg (23,700 lb)
- Max takeoff weight: 13,000 kg (28,660 lb)
- Fuel capacity: 3,555 L (939 US gal; 782 imp gal) / 2,700 kg (5,952 lb) internal

2x 1,000 L (260 US gal; 220 imp gal) drop tanks inboard and 2x 500 L (130 US gal; 110 imp gal) drop tanks outboard

- Powerplant: 1 × Rolls-Royce Spey 807 turbofan engine, 49.1 kN (11,000 lbf) thrust

Performance

- Maximum speed: 1,053 km/h (654 mph, 568 kn) at 10,975 m (36,007 ft)
- Maximum speed: Mach 0.85
- Combat range: 889 km (552 mi, 480 nmi) hi-lo-hi profile, with 900 kg (1,984 lb) of external stores
- Ferry range: 3,336 km (2,073 mi, 1,801 nmi)
- Endurance: 4 hours, 15 minutes
- Service ceiling: 13,000 m (43,000 ft)
- Rate of climb: 52.1 m/s (10,260 ft/min)
- Wing loading: 512 kg/m^{2} (105 lb/sq ft)
- Thrust/weight: 0.47

Armament

- Guns:

- 1× 20 mm (0.787 in) M61A1 Vulcan 6-barreled Gatling cannon (Italian aircraft)
- 2× 30 mm (1.181 in) Bernardini Mk-164 cannon (Brazilian aircraft)

- Rockets: rocket pods
- Missiles: 2× AIM-9 Sidewinders or MAA-1 Piranha or A-Darter, carried on wingtip rails

- air-to-ground missiles

- Bombs: 3,800 kg (8,378 lb) on 5 external hardpoints, including MAR-1 missiles, general-purpose and laser-guided bombs

== Incidents ==
- A Brazilian A-1M was lost in April 2019.

== See also ==
Aircraft of comparable role, configuration, and era

- British Aerospace Hawk 200
- Dassault/Dornier Alpha Jet
- Soko J-22 Orao

Related lists

- List of attack aircraft
- List of active Brazilian military aircraft
