= AMX International =

Italian-Brazilian aircraft manufacturer

AMX International Ltd
- Industry: Aerospace
- Founded: 1980
- Products: Aircraft
- Owners: Alenia, Aermacchi and Embraer

AMX International Ltd was a joint venture company established to develop, manufacture and market the AMX ground attack aircraft.

Established during the late 1970s specifically to produce the AMX, the company initially comprised Italian aircraft manufacturers Alenia and Aermacchi. During the early 1980s, the Brazilian aviation company Embraer became a member of AMX International after Brazil's government opted to become involved in the project. The company's headquarters were located in Rome. The first Italian-assembled prototype performed its maiden flight on 15 May 1984; the first Brazilian-assembled prototype made its first flight on 16 October 1985. Deliveries of production commenced during 1988; the final aircraft was assembled during 1999.

== History ==
AMX International can trace its routes back to a decision taken during the late 1970s by two rival Italian aircraft manufacturers Alenia and Aermacchi to mutually cooperate in the development of a new ground attack aircraft. This enterprise had been stimulated by the release of a requirement by the Italian Air Force for 187 new-build strike fighters, primarily to replace its existing inventory of Aeritalia G.91s in the close air support and reconnaissance missions. Prior to their agreement to collaborate, both firms had already independently considered developing a similar class of combat aircraft. During April 1978, development work on the joint venture formally commenced.

During 1980, the Brazilian government announced that they intended to participate in the program in order to provide a replacement for the Aermacchi MB-326. In July 1981, the Italian and Brazilian governments agreed on joint requirements for the aircraft; shortly thereafter, the Brazilian aircraft manufacturer Embraer was invited to join the industrial partnership. An agreement was also struck to divide AMX manufacturing between the partners; for each production aircraft, Aeritalia manufactured 46.5 per cent of the components (central fuselage, stabilisers and rudders), Aermacchi produced 22.8 per cent (front fuselage and tail cone), and Embraer performed 29.7 per cent of the work (wing, air intakes, pylons and drop tanks). There was no duplication of work, each component of the aircraft was built at one source only. The planned requirements were 187 aircraft for Italy and 100 for Brazil.

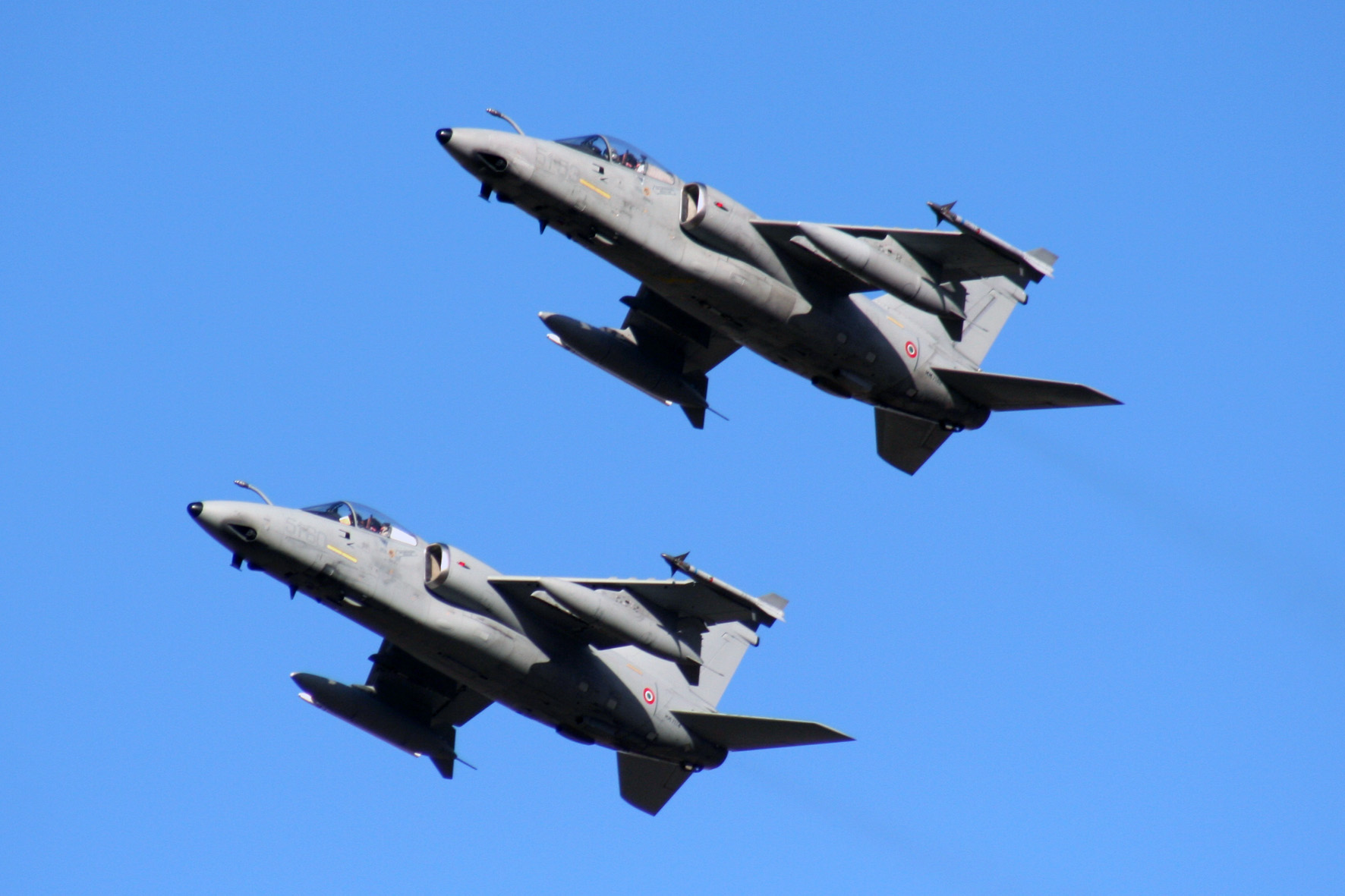
A pair of AMXs in flight, 2010

A total of seven flight-capable prototypes were produced for the test program, three by Aeritalia, two by Aermacchi, and two by Embraer, as well as two static airframes. The first prototype, assembled in Italy, made its maiden flight on 15 May 1984. This first aircraft was lost on its fifth flight in an accident, resulting in the death of its pilot. Aside from this early loss, testing progressed smoothly and without further incident. The first Brazilian-assembled prototype made its first flight on 16 October 1985. On 11 May 1988, the first production aircraft performed its first flight. Deliveries of production aircraft to Italy began in 1988, the first examples were delivered to the Brazilian Air Force during the following year. On 14 March 1990, the prototype two-seat AMX made its first flight.

Despite the pooling of manufacturing work, Brazilian and Italian aircraft differ considerably in their avionics; Italian AMXs are equipped with various NATO systems which were considered redundant in the South American theatre. Furthermore, AMXs in Brazilian service are typically fitted with one of three pallet-mounted sensor packages, which contain various vertical, oblique, and forward-facing cameras, for performing the aircraft's secondary aerial reconnaissance role. A simple ranging radar is equipped for targeting purposes, however the specific radar also differs between both operators. While Italian aircraft are fitted with a M61 Vulcan 20 mm rotary cannon on the port side of the lower fuselage, the United States denied the sale of the M61 to Brazil, thus its AMXs are instead fitted with two 30 mm DEFA 554 revolver cannons.

== Product ==
- AMX International AMX
