= VF1 =

VF1, or similar, may refer to:

- VF-1, a deactivated fighter squadron of the United States Navy
- VF-1 (Brazil), a fighter squadron of the Brazilian Navy
- VF-1 Valkyrie, a fictional aircraft in the Macross and Robotech series
- Virtua Fighter (video game), a 1993 fighting game
- Na_{V}1.5, an alias VF1
