= 1st Interceptor and Strike Fighter Squadron (Brazil) =

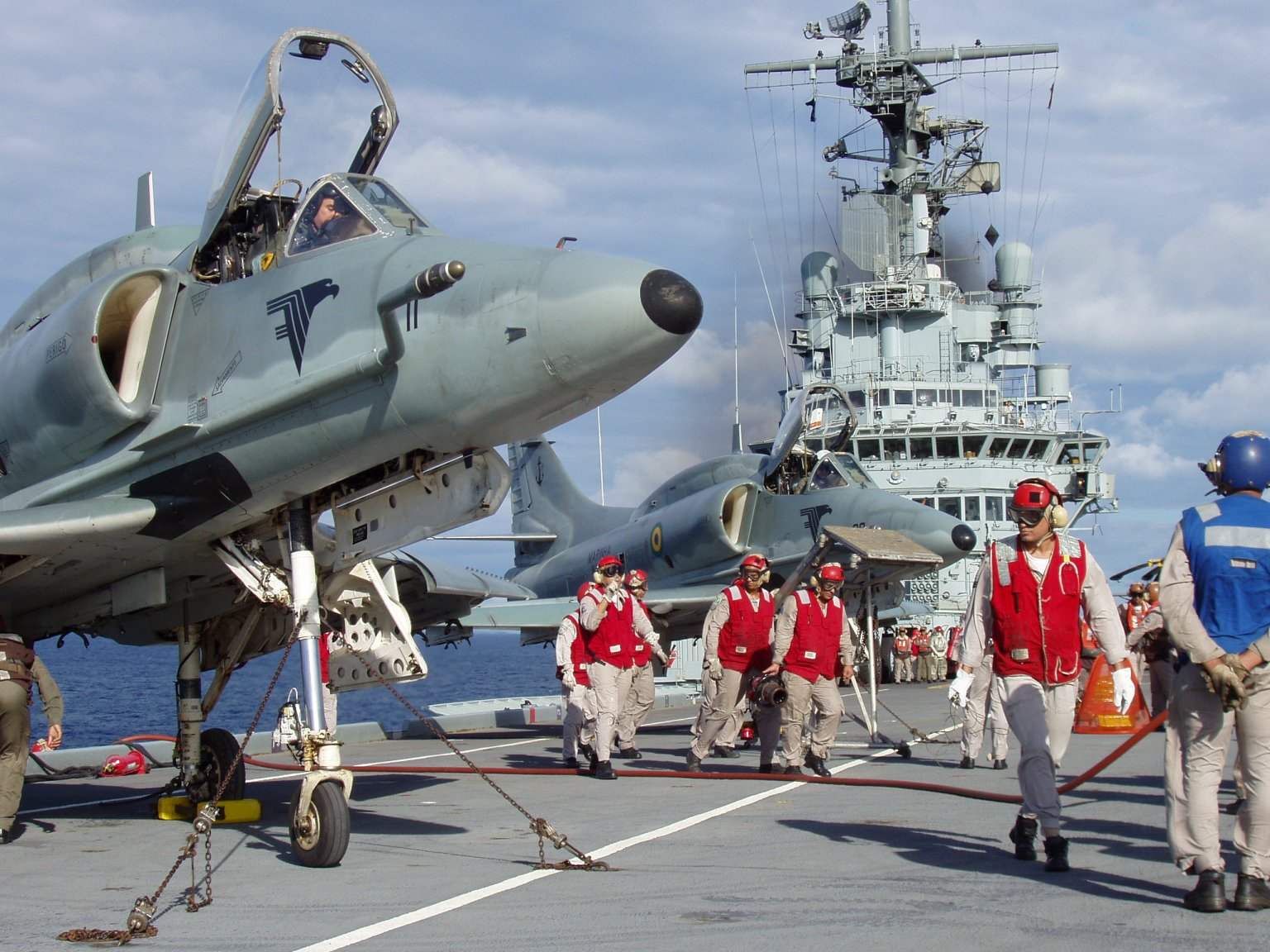
- VF-1 Skyhawks on São Paulo's flight deck in 2004
- Active: 2 October 1998; 28 years ago
- Country: Brazil
- Branch: Brazilian Navy
- Type: Fighter/Attack
- Part of: Brazilian Naval Aviation
- Garrison/HQ: São Pedro da Aldeia Naval Air Base
- Nickname: Falcões (Falcons)
- Mottos: In Are Defensio Maris ("In the air, the defense of the sea")

Insignia
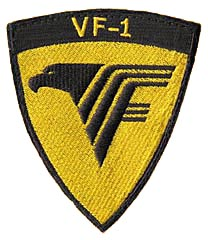
- Badge

Aircraft flown
- Fighter: A-4KU Skyhawk

The 1st Interceptor and Strike Fighter Squadron (Portuguese: 1º Esquadrão de Aviões de Interceptação e Ataque; VF-1), known as "Falcon Squadron", is the Brazilian Naval Aviation unit created to fly McDonnell Douglas A-4 Skyhawk fighters on aircraft carriers of the Brazilian Navy (MB). The decommissioning of NAe São Paulo in 2017, after more than a decade inoperative, limits the squadron to taking off from land-based runways, especially its headquarters at the São Pedro da Aldeia Naval Air Base (BAeNSPA), Rio de Janeiro, where it is subordinate to the Naval Air Force Command. Its planes had the designations AF-1 (single-seater) and AF-1A (two-seater), later changed after modernization in 2015–2022 to AF-1B and AF-1C. The VF-1 operates the only fighters in Brazil outside the Brazilian Air Force (FAB). It was the last squadron in the world to fly the Skyhawk from aircraft carriers and, together with the Argentine Air Force, is the last military operator of that plane.

The Brazilian Navy's desire for embarked fighters has existed since the 1982 Falklands War, when the importance of the navy's air defense against aircraft and anti-ship missiles, which can reach surface assets in a few minutes, became evident. The interceptor planes would be one of the elements of the embarked air wing and would be part of a "layered defense" of the ships. On land, they could provide close air support to the Marine Corps. The opportunity to acquire fighter jets arose in the 90s, when the FAB deactivated its 1st Embarked Aviation Group (GAE) aboard the aircraft carrier Minas Gerais. Since the "Castelo Branco corollary" of 1965, Naval Aviation was restricted by law to helicopters, but the navy overcame political resistance in the FAB and obtained a new presidential decree authorizing its planes. Since then, relations with the FAB have improved, and there is frequent joint training. The chosen plane was a batch of 23 Skyhawks purchased from Kuwait in 1998. The Skyhawk originates from the 1950s and was not designed as a fighter/interceptor, although it can be used in that role.

The investments required in personnel and infrastructure were heavy. Pilots, called "hunters", take almost four years to train, including periods in the United States Air Force and Navy. The squadron only started flying from Minas Gerais in 2001, but that ship was too limited for fighters and was replaced in that same year by NAe São Paulo. Shipborne operations, focused on training a critical mass of pilots, reached a peak in 2003, but both the aircraft carrier and fighters suffered serious availability issues. In addition to being difficult to maintain, the planes were outdated: there were no modern weapons such as guided bombs, beyond-visual-range air-to-air missiles and anti-ship missiles, nor in-flight refueling planes and early aerial warning to make fighters more efficient. Only eight pilots were qualified for embarked operations in 2005.

Embraer was contracted in 2009 to modernize twelve Skyhawks; thus, half of the original fleet would already be retired. After the official decommissioning of São Paulo in 2017, the contract was reduced to just six aircraft, which were delivered from 2015 to 2022. The expected useful life is until 2030, and its successors studied by the navy are the Gripen NG, also chosen by the FAB, or the F/A-18 Hornet. However, if the squadron becomes like any other land-based fighter unit, an argument may arise for its deactivation. The modernization gave the squadron the most advanced variant of the Skyhawk ever developed, with modern sensors and digital instruments, but the purchase of weapons was only in the study phase. The Brazilian Navy still values these aircraft in maritime reconnaissance, as they can reach the limit of the country's exclusive economic zone in 30 minutes and, with their new radar, identify naval targets 160 kilometers away. The VF-1 still sends fighters to exercises across the country.

== Creation ==
=== Demand for fighter jets in the Brazilian Navy ===
Observation of the Falklands War, fought between Argentina and the United Kingdom in 1982, made the Brazilian Navy realize its weakness in a hypothetical conflict in the South Atlantic. Argentine aircraft sank or damaged several British ships with anti-ship missiles and bombs, and only did no more damage due to the heavy casualties they suffered to British aircraft with air-to-air missiles. By offering air superiority and power projection over land and sea, aircraft carriers confirmed their importance as the core of fleets. Brazil had the aircraft carrier Minas Gerais, acquired in 1956, but its function was anti-submarine warfare; it did not have the ideal size and capabilities to operate jets.

Officers in academic positions in the 1980s, breaking with this paradigm, began to defend a fleet with power projection, equipped with its own fighters.Soon after the war, in 1983, Minister of the Navy Maximiano Eduardo da Silva Fonseca presented a statement of reasons for the purchase of 12 A-4 Skyhawk aircraft to president João Figueiredo. The seller would be the Israeli Air Force, but there were no financial and political conditions for the purchase. Still before the war, at the turn of the 70s to 80s, the purchase of Israeli Skyhawks, to be operated by the FAB aboard Minas Gerais, was vetoed by the Ministry of Planning. Another possibility, the development of an onboard version of the Alenia/Aermacchi/Embraer AMX A-1 attack aircraft, was announced, but was canceled in 1985.

The following decade brought more arguments in favor of having fighters on board. With the end of the Cold War, the hypothesis of using Minas Gerais to defend maritime commerce against Soviet submarines no longer had a place. The goal changed to a "balanced squadron", with air coverage for its surface assets sailing far from the coast. It was also argued based on the performance of the naval force in exercises and air support for Marine Corps contingents sent on United Nations peacekeeping missions. The end of the useful life of the FAB planes embarked in Minas Gerais, and of the aircraft carrier itself, was approaching, opening up an opportunity for the navy. The Brazilian Air Force had no plans for a replacement for its maritime patrol P-16 Trackers, organized in the 1st Embarked Aviation Group (GAE). (Note: The P-16 Trackers were decommissioned in 1996. The FAB purchased the P-3 Orion, an aircraft for land bases. See Freitas, Wilmar Terroso (2018). "Aviação de Patrulha: história e tradição de segurança e defesa nas águas jurisdicionais brasileiras". Revista do IGHMB. 77 (105). p. 76.) It was going through one of the worst moments in its history and had higher priorities, such as SIVAM.In the absence of the 1st GAE, Minas Gerais was reduced to the role of a helicopter carrier.

=== The choice for the A-4 Skyhawk ===
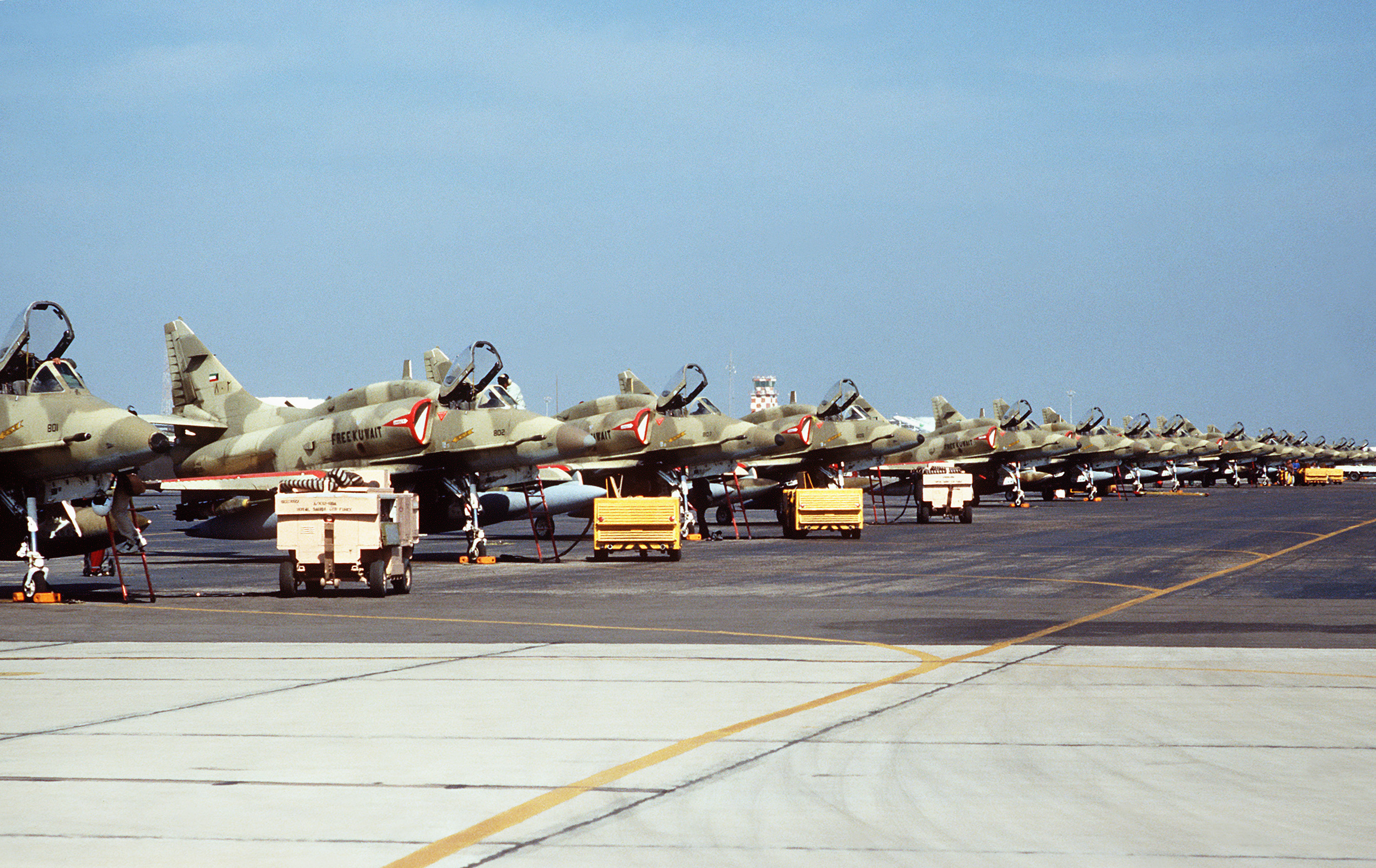
Kuwaiti Air Force A-4KUs

The Brazilian Navy decided to directly obtain a batch of interceptors instead of the slower route, which would be to first acquire training aircraft. The chosen model would need compatibility with Minas Gerais and equivalence to the Super Étendard of the Argentine Navy. The options considered were the Étendard itself or the A-4 Skyhawk. The Skyhawk was chosen as an "opportunity purchase", taking advantage of the offer of retired models from the Kuwait Air Force with many spare parts and good condition: an average of 1,700 flight hours, without exhausting on-board operations, and, thanks to the desert conditions, little corrosion. An opposing argument was that obsolete planes would end up unusable due to the lack of logistical support.

The Skyhawk is an American jet known for its service in the Vietnam War in the 1960s, in which it took off from U.S. Navy aircraft carriers to bomb land targets. Interception of enemy aircraft was the responsibility of the F-4 Phantom II. The A-4 was designed as a bomber. Attack aircraft like it have crucial differences from dedicated interceptors like the F-4. The attack aircraft has good maneuverability, but its externally transported load has high drag, creating aerodynamic problems and making it difficult to reach supersonic speed. The interceptor needs precisely this speed to fulfill its function, in addition to flying at higher altitudes. The Skyhawk is a subsonic aircraft, but it can exceed the supersonic speed when diving. For admiral Armando Amorim Vidigal, the Skyhawk is not ideal for the role assigned to it by the Brazilian Navy, and the right thing to do would have been to buy interceptors and aerial early warning aircraft. However, it was unlikely that these planes would be able to operate in Minas Gerais. In 2000, an article in Revista Marítima Brasileira suggested that the Skyhawk's successor would be a multiple-purpose aircraft, combining attack and interception characteristics, as it was already trending in the United States.

On the other hand, the U.S. Navy itself recognized the possibilities of the Skyhawk as a fighter, assigning some to the air defense of aircraft carriers. Its Skyhawks on bombing missions ended up engaging in aerial combat with MiG fighters, and after the war they simulated opposing MiGs in training. Because of their low cost and relatively cheap maintenance, large numbers were exported to other countries, where, in a lightweight configuration, they could serve as fighters on small aircraft carriers. Australia and Argentina operated Skyhawks from aircraft carriers of the same class as Minas Gerais. The robust structure of this aircraft for embarked operations ensured longevity in service. The Skyhawks of the Argentine Air Force and Naval Aviation were the most successful aircraft in attacks against ships during the Falklands War, but suffered heavy casualties. Most of its flights were made from bases on land, as the aircraft carrier ARA Veinticinco de Mayo was removed from the operations zone after the sinking of the ARA General Belgrano by a submarine.

Technologically, the A-4 Skyhawk entered service in 1956 and was equivalent to two generations of fighters before the F/A-18 Hornet, a multiple-purpose aircraft that, in the 1990s, replaced the A-6 as an attack by the U.S. Navy. In the same decade, the Argentine Air Force acquired modernized Skyhawks (Lockheed Martin A-4AR). After the Gulf War in 1990–1991, Kuwait replaced its Skyhawks with the F/A-18 Hornet. Kuwaiti A-4s had been purchased in 1974, along with Mirage F1 fighters, and fought in the war. At the time, they were advanced within the Skyhawk family, but by the end of the 2000s the gap in relation to modern multi-purpose fighters was clear. Brazilian Skyhawks were the last in the world to take off from aircraft carriers. In 2014, with the imminent decommissioning of Israeli A-4s, Brazil and Argentina were the last countries to fly this plane.

=== Political factors ===
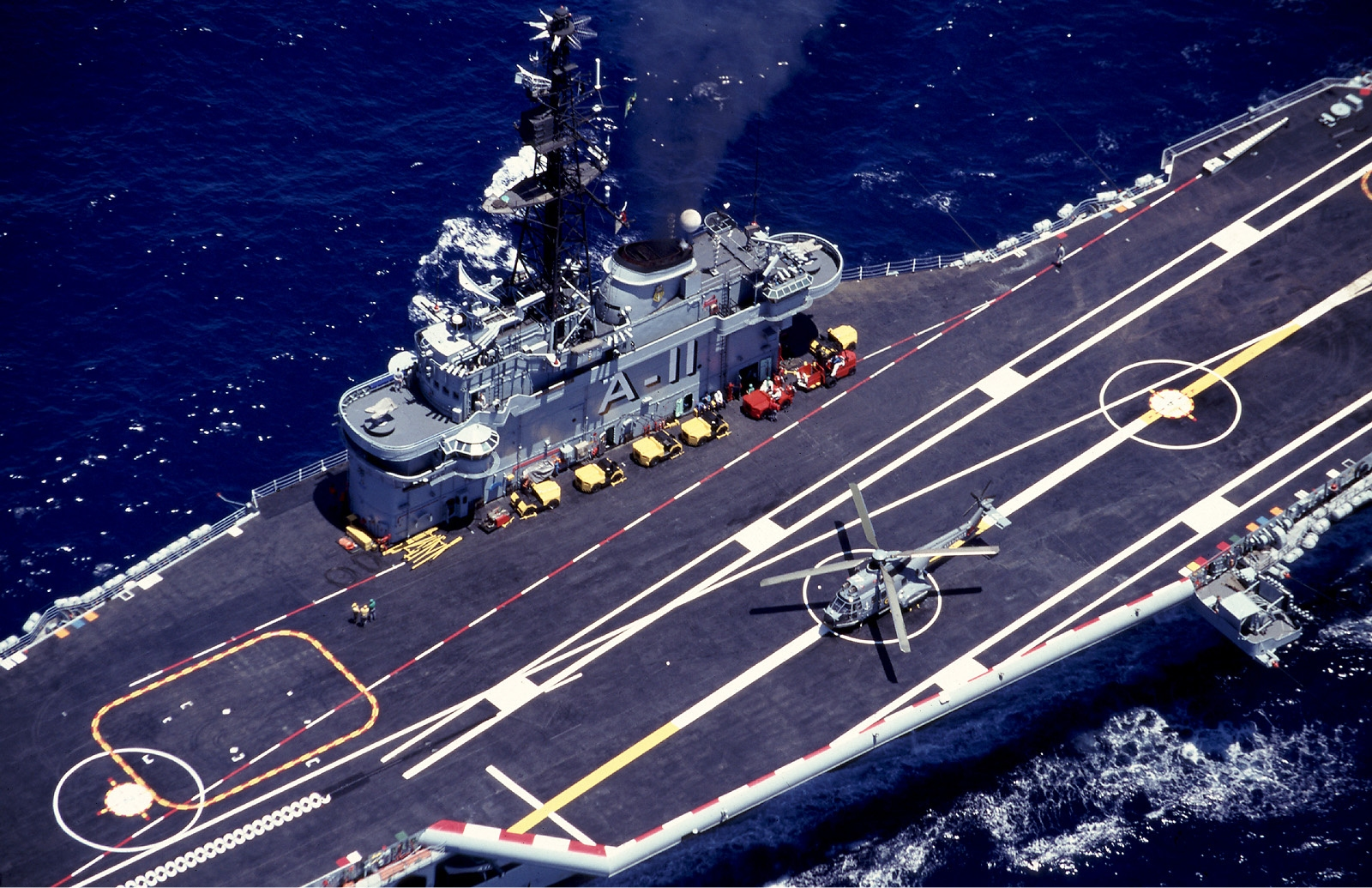
NAeL Minas Gerais in 1996, in its last years

Officers went to Argentina and Uruguay in 1994 to train as pilots. In September 1996, Navy Minister Mauro César Rodrigues Pereira presented his statement of reasons for purchasing the aircraft. However, the navy's ambition came up against the legal prohibition of having fixed-wing aircraft. Its fierce dispute with the Brazilian Air Force over embarked aviation had concluded in 1965: a decree restricted Naval Aviation to helicopters, disappointing the naval officers. Three decades later, they returned to the same agenda.

Minister Mauro César would have as internal obstacles the FAB, the army and the economic agenda of Fernando Henrique Cardoso's government, and externally, Argentine distrust. The Argentine Navy became an ally, as it already developed good relations with the Brazilian Navy and, after deactivating its aircraft carrier in 1997, it intended to keep its naval aviation functioning. The Argentines, and not the FAB, helped train the Brazilian Navy pilots during this period. Two Argentine officers were part of the Brazilian delegation in Kuwait, and an A-4Q from the Argentine Naval Aviation was used for tests on board Minas Gerais.

The training in Argentina and Uruguay had not been negotiated as part of the foreign policy of their respective countries, but through independent channels of communication between their military. Minister of Aeronautics Lélio Viana Lobo declared that he had learned about the training by "cross roads". The resources for the purchase came from the navy itself through the Naval Fund. The London Naval Commission began preparing the contract after the Brazilian Navy received the offer for the A-4, in June 1997. The process revealed the autonomy of each of the Armed Forces branches among themselves and in relation to the government, and this lack of consensus impelled the government to increase its political control over the military, contributing to the creation of the National Defense Policy (PDN) in 1996. In 1997, journalist Antônio Carlos Pereira, from Estado de S. Paulo, accused the navy of having presented the purchase to the president as a fait accompli and of subverting the PND and inter-branch cooperation. According to naval aviator Pedro Lynch, admiral Mauro César had Fernando Henrique Cardoso's authorization to make the purchase since 1997.

The letter of intent for the purchase was signed by the respective governments on 19 December 1997. The reception was not unanimous in the Armed Forces. The Minister of Aeronautics said he was surprised. For Army Minister Zenildo de Lucena, the Skyhawks were "crap". The controversy came to a head. The Air Force insisted on its monopoly on airspace defense, and within the navy itself there was dissent, as resources were scarce and investment would come at the expense of the nuclear submarine program, a priority until then. Proponents of the purchase had doctrinal arguments in their favor, as Brazil was the only country in the world with a mixed arrangement (navy and air force) on aircraft carriers. Folha de S. Paulo reported in January 1998 that only an older minority within the FAB defended an "indivisible" air force, and the transfer of embarked aviation to the navy would bring savings to the FAB. President Fernando Henrique Cardoso intervened in favor of the navy and on 8 April 1998 he issued a decree repealing the ban on fixed wing aircraft in naval aviation. By increasing military salaries and financing technological modernization, including fighters, the president sought to pave the way for increased control. For the navy in particular, he sought to somewhat placate its demands, which had the least influence of the three branches of the armed forces.

=== Consolidation of the unit ===
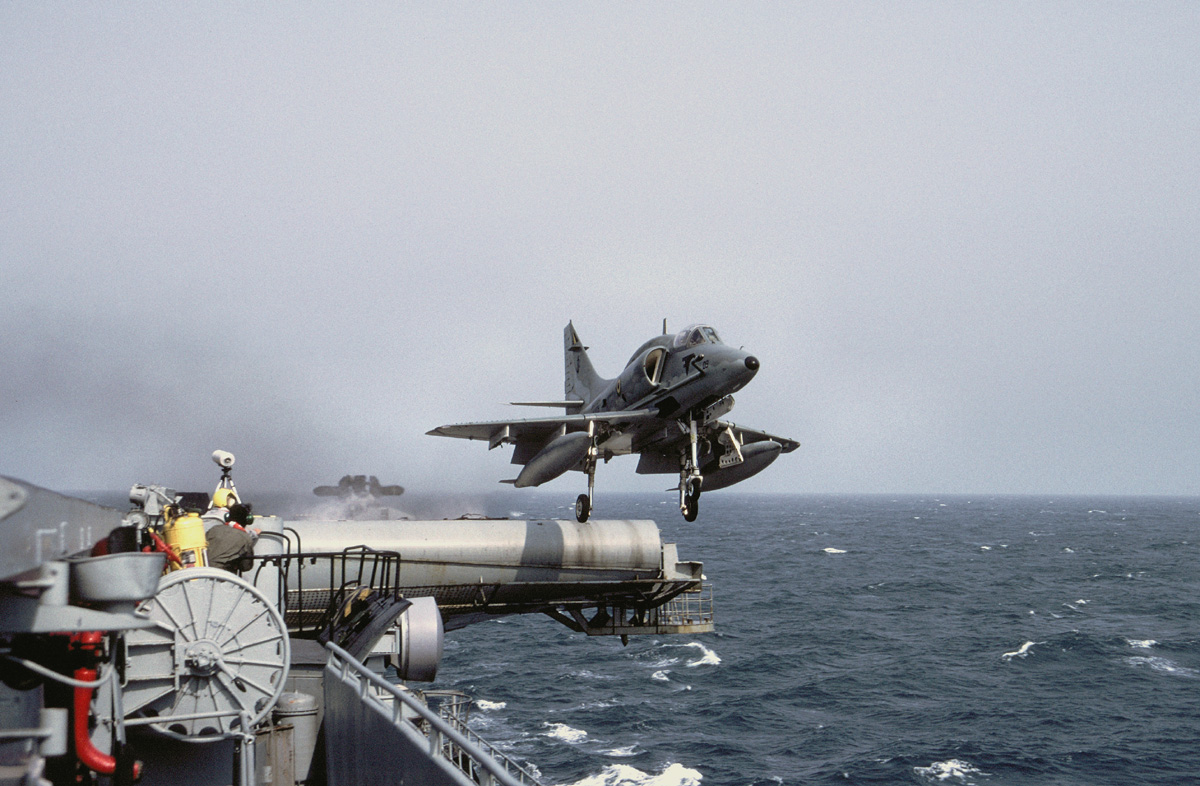

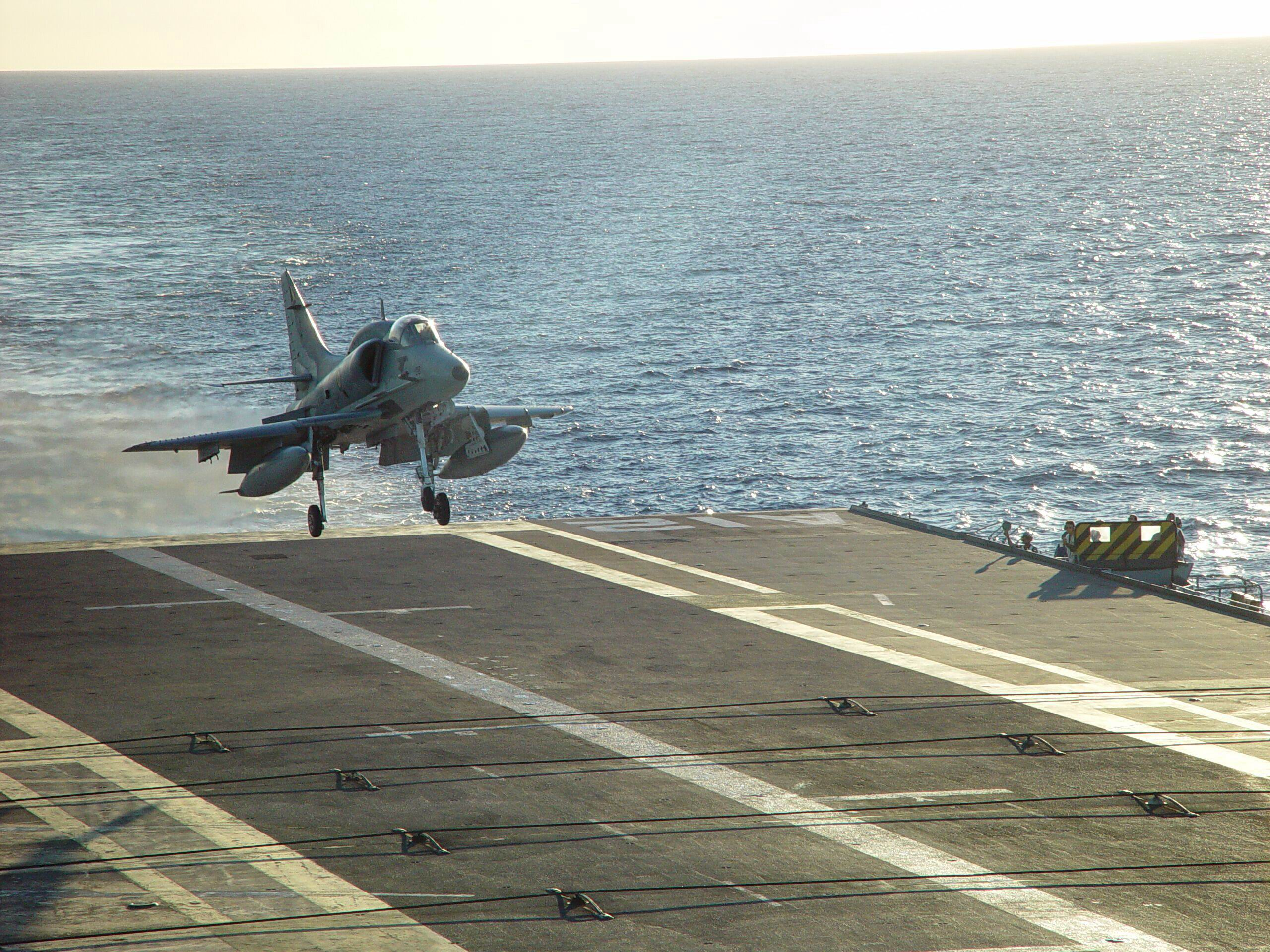
AF-1 takeoff and landing aboard São Paulo

The acquisition agreement was signed on 30 April 1998. In September, 20 single-seat A-4KU and three two-seat TA-4KU aircraft arrived in Brazil, designated by the Brazilian Navy as AF-1 and AF-1A. When they disembarked, they still had their desert camouflage and the writing "Free Kuwait". The AF-1s received registration numbers from N-1001 to N-1020, and the AF-1A, from N-1021 to N-1023. The camouflage pattern adopted in Brazil, with three shades of gray, is based on the U.S. Marine Corps scheme. The 1st Interceptor and Strike Fighter Squadron, designated VF-1, according to American nomenclature, (Note: V designates squadrons with fixed-wing aircraft, F is for fighter and 1 is the identification number. See Evans, Mark L.; Grossnick, Roy A. (2015). "Squadron designations and abbreviations". United States Naval Aviation 1910-2010 vol. II: Statistics. Washington: Naval History and Heritage Command.) received the radio code "Falcão". It was activated on 2 October 1998, when it was not yet capable of flying. The on-board operation capability had to be built almost from scratch.

The package, budgeted at around US$70 million, also included 19 engines, many other spare parts, 219 AIM-9H Sidewinder air-to-air missiles and other weapons, in addition to overhauling the aircraft. They required heavy investments and the expansion of the maintenance and pilot training infrastructure. In São Pedro da Aldeia, the navy built another hangar and expanded the landing strip from the Naval Aviation base. Initially there was a shortage of personnel. 16 pilots had already been trained in Argentina, Uruguay and the United States in 1994–1998, and from 1999 the FAB offered flight instruction to naval aviators; after the purchase of fighters, relations between the services improved and the air force cooperated with the squadron.

The American company Kay & Associates Inc. was hired to review the material (aircraft, engines, spare parts and support equipment), train and qualify maintenance technicians and, later, prepare the pilots' transition to onboard operations, hiring two retired U.S. Navy officers. The first flights were in 2000, and the first tailhook landing of an AF-1 in Minas Gerais took place on 31 January 2001. The first launch via catapult was on 18 January, and that year regular and long-distance operations began.

The squadron implicitly included a possible new aircraft carrier. Minas Gerais's catapult could launch an AF-1 in any wind conditions, but due to the Skyhawk's small wing surface, landing required 30 knots of relative wind, with the ship heading into the wind. As the carrier's nominal speed was 24 knots, in practice much lower, it would depend heavily on the natural wind. Only bases on land would offer safe landing, forcing Minas Gerais to navigate close to the coast. Furthermore, its dimensions were small and risky for landing high-performance jets, as it was an aircraft carrier designed for World War II aircraft. Consequently, the navy replaced Minas Gerais with the French aircraft carrier Foch, also old, but more modern and spacious, with a nominal speed of 32 knots and two catapults. Named São Paulo, the new carrier was commissioned into the navy in 2001.

The achievement with the squadron and the aircraft carrier was received with euphoria in the navy, but the press criticized the obsolescence of the materiel. The navy defended itself and found support in part of public opinion, arguing that the Foch had been reformed and the Skyhawks would be an intermediate step towards obtaining more modern aircraft.

== Structure and personnel ==
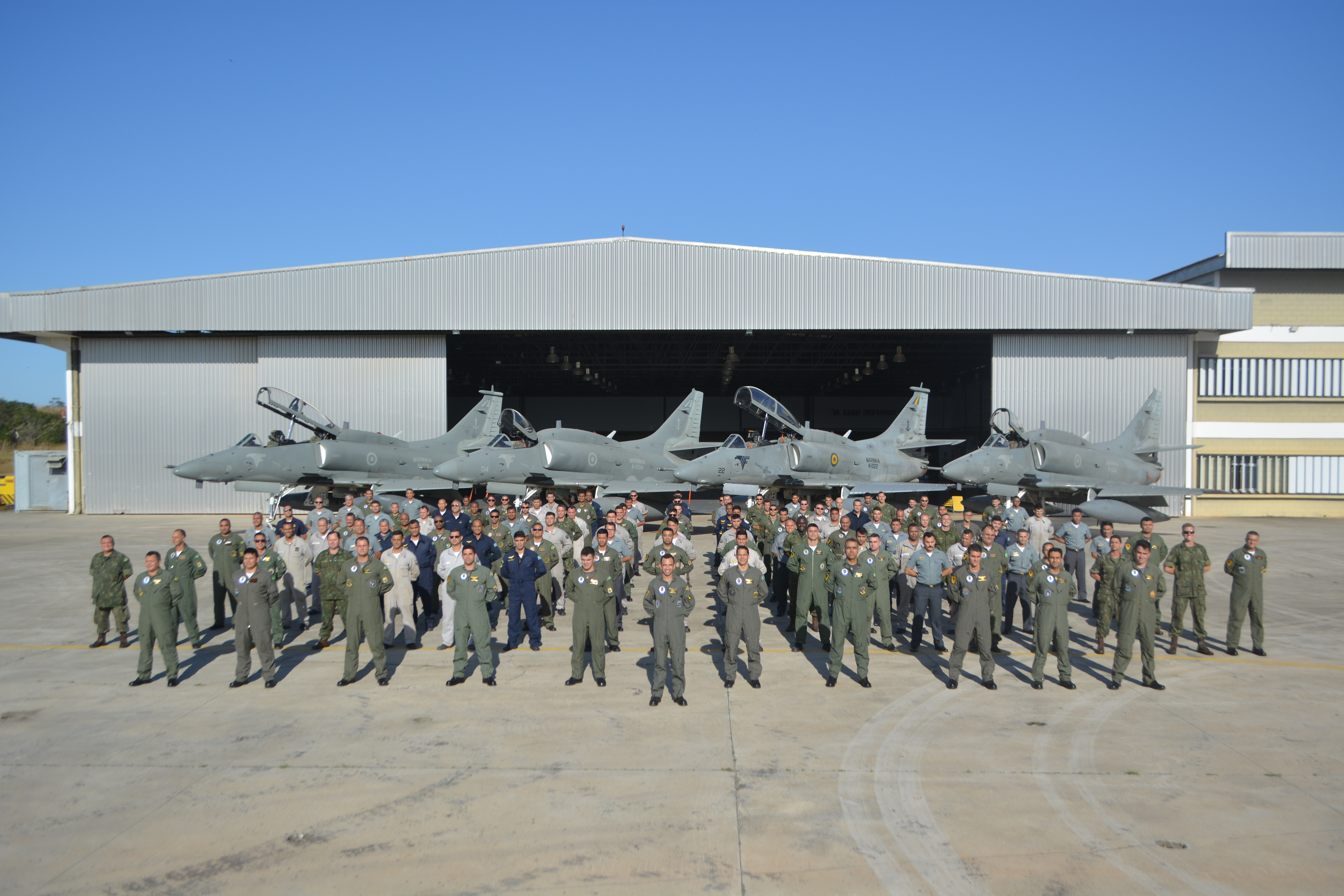
Squadron personnel and aircraft

The squadron is headquartered at the São Pedro da Aldeia Naval Air Base (Base Aérea Naval de São Pedro da Aldeia, BAeNSPA) and subordinate to the Naval Air Force Command. Its command is exercised by a frigate captain. The structure is typical of a fighter unit, with Operations, Maintenance, Flight Safety and Administration sectors. Its physical facilities consist of two hangars and four Flight Line Hangars. First-echelon maintenance takes place within the unit, and second and third echelon maintenance takes place within the Aeronaval Maintenance Group. Companies approved by the Navy Aeronautics Directorate review specific items. When the Skyhawks were purchased, neither Brazil nor Argentina had the means to repair their complex avionics components. Warehouse-level maintenance depended on shipping items to factories in the United States.

The number of pilots was originally expected to be thirty, but in 2005 there were only eight pilots qualified for onboard operations. In 2022, the pilots were six. Pilot training is a long process of almost four years of selection, studies and training. In common with other naval aviators, VF-1 "hunters" are officers with one to three years of prior naval experience. Coming from the navy or Marine Corps, everyone enters Naval Aviation through the theoretical course at the Naval Air Instruction and Training Center (CIAAN), at BAeNSPA.

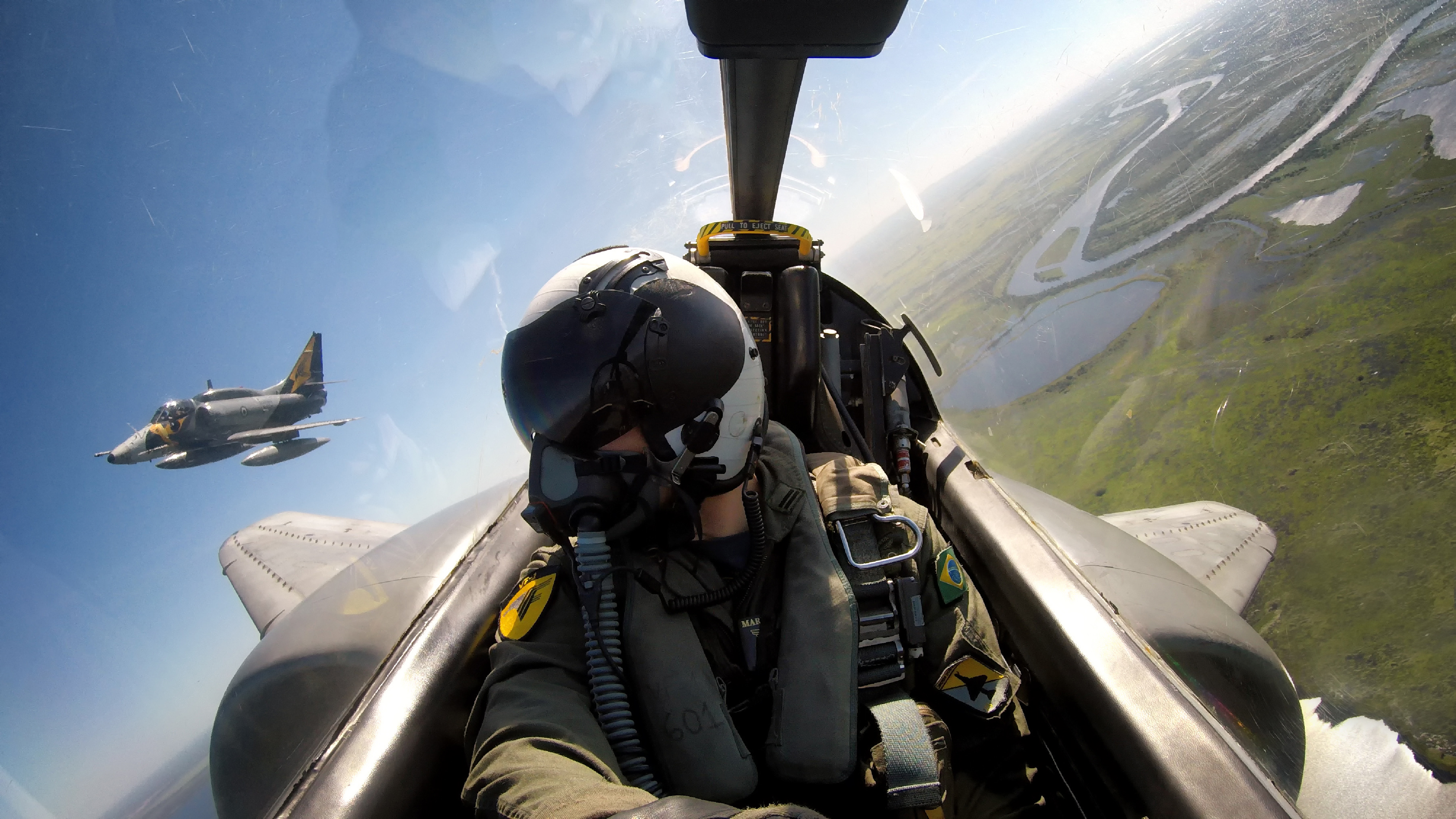
VF-1 pilot in flight

Ten of the 25 aviators from each class (depending on vacancies) are selected to fly in fixed wing aircraft at the Air Force Academy (AFA), in Pirassununga, according to medical and psychotechnical examinations and the Military Piloting Aptitude Test. At AFA they do the primary aviation internship, flying Neiva T-25 planes. Two to four of the aviators are selected by the Fixed Wing Pilot Performance Assessment Council (Capedaf), made up of CIAAN and AFA officers, to proceed to the basic fixed wing internship, flying the T-27 Tucano, while the rest are used by the navy as helicopter pilots. Those who remained at AFA are again selected to continue their license in the United States. There they study English, with an emphasis on flying technique, at the Defense Language Institute; survival at sea at Naval Air Station Pensacola; and theoretical and practical training, flying the T-45 Goshawk, at Naval Air Station Kingsville, including landing on a U.S. Navy aircraft carrier.

Upon returning to Brazil, pilots undergo ground school, flight simulator training and transition to aircraft. The two-seat models (AF-1A, later AF-1C) were purchased for training, but were not used for on-board training due to their greater weight and lower fuel capacity, which limited the number of landings. Pilots go through the basic (pre-solo, solo flight, instrument flight rules and basic and tactical training) and operational (interception, attack on land and sea targets, aerial combat, close air support and in-flight refueling) stages. The Brazilian Air Force collaborates with its KC-130Ms in in-flight refueling, and navy fighters carry out exchanges, flying their Super Tucanos.

== Expected functions ==
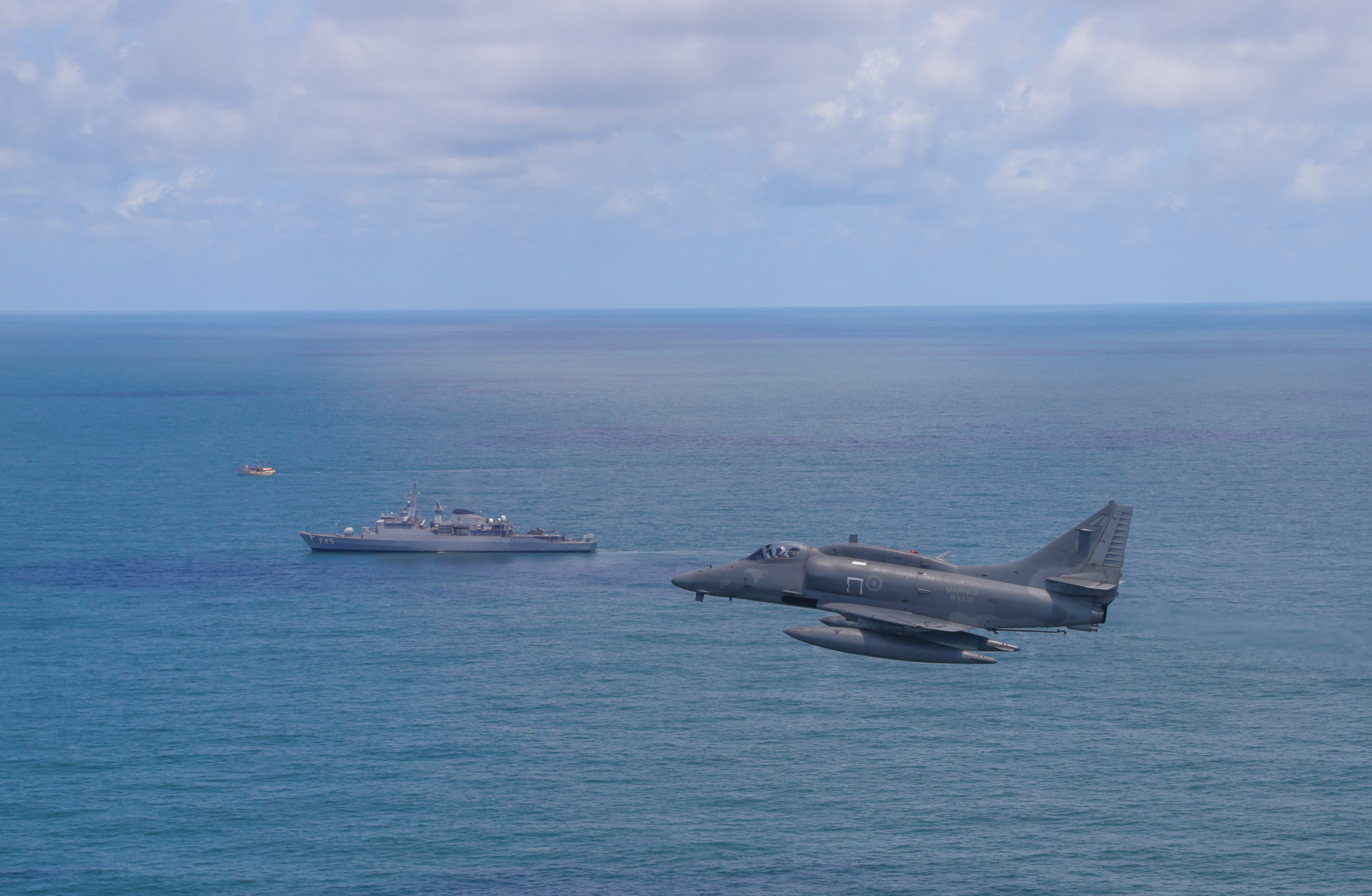

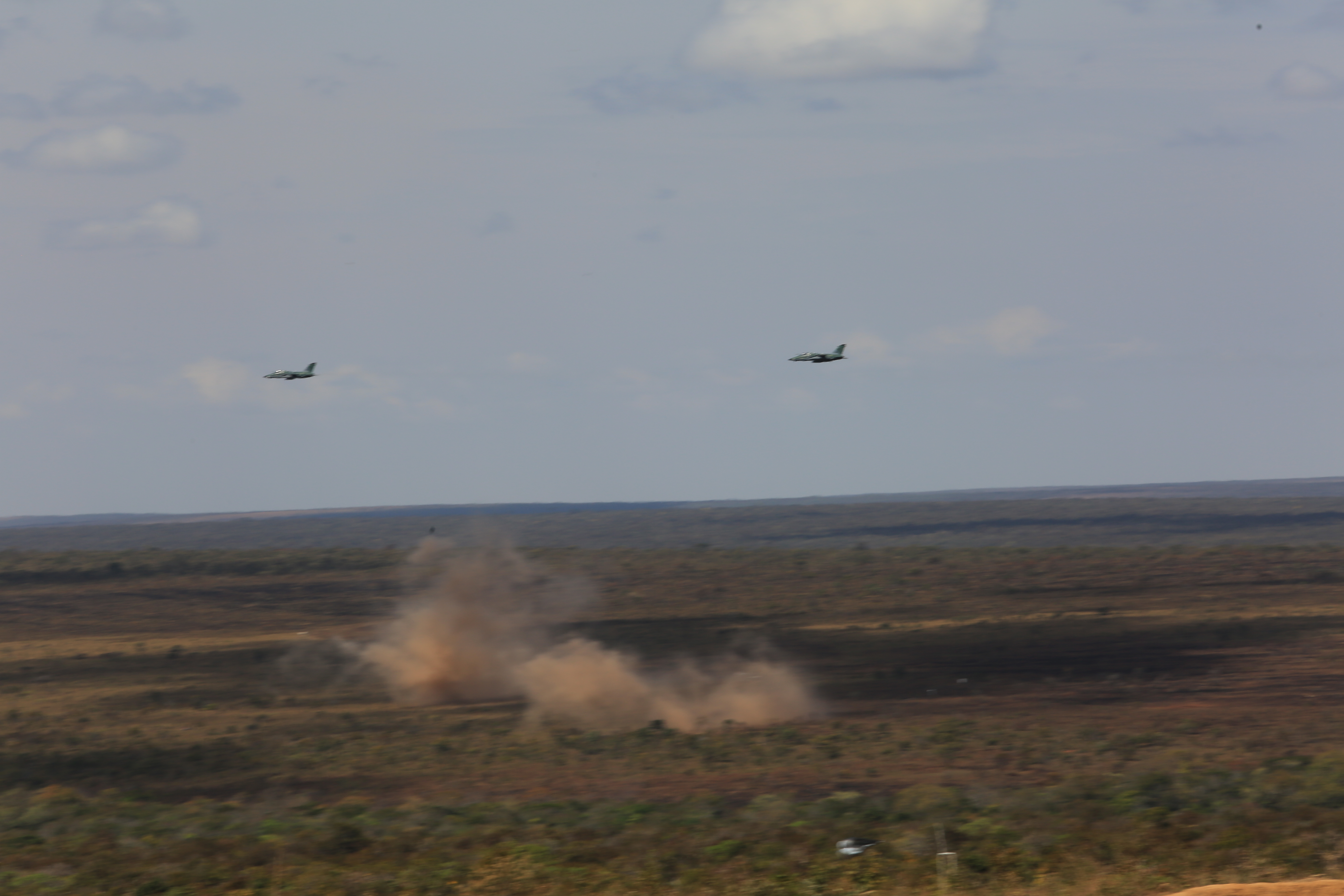
Skyhawks at sea, accompanying the frigate União, and on land in the Operation Formosa of 2022

The Brazilian Navy conceptualizes interceptor and attack aircraft as part of the embarked air wing of an aircraft carrier, which, in turn, would be the nucleus of a naval force. The air wing would also include aircraft for airborne early warning, or AEW, in-flight refueling, maritime clearance and anti-submarine warfare. This force could sail far from the coast and provide the squadron's aerospace defense, reacting with its aircraft in the shortest possible time, which would not be viable with land-based aviation.

Aerial threats (aircraft and missiles) can reach the fleet in a few minutes, and therefore must be faced as far away from the ships as possible. Defense is "layered", with surface-to-air missiles and ships' cannons and interceptor aircraft vectored by AEW aircraft. Interceptors can be on alert in flight or on combat air patrol, which offers better reaction time. In addition to reacting to the attack, it is necessary to deny information to the enemy, preventing aerial clarification, and attack aerial threats at their origin. In the absence of these resources, navies with few resources are restricted to the proximity of their coast. In this way, São Paulo and the VF-1 would make the Brazilian Navy a blue-water navy.

Interceptors need in-flight refueling aircraft to extend their flight range, which is a crucial factor, and AEW aircraft, which increase their reaction time by up to four times. Ship radars can perform volume air search and vector interceptors, but their horizon for identifying missiles and low-flying aircraft is shorter. The navy planned the 1st Air Transport and Early Warning Aircraft Squadron (EsqdVEC-1) to complete the embarked air wing, with four C-1 Traders expected to be delivered in 2021, but the schedule was not fulfilled and the navy canceled the program in 2023.

The difficult maintenance and high unavailability of the VF-1 and its aircraft carrier rendered the conceived air defense inoperative. São Paulo was officially decommissioned in 2017. In the absence of an aircraft carrier, the squadron, restricted to taking off from land bases, is kept in operation to preserve the doctrine of fighter operations. It can still provide close air support to the Marine Corps, and is valued by the navy for its flight range and modernized sensor capabilities. The AF-1B and AF-1C reach the limits of Brazil's exclusive economic zone in 30 minutes, can operate together with the NAM Atlântico's radar, freeing Naval Aviation helicopters from reconnaissance tasks and reducing requests for assistance to airborne alarm aircraft from the air force. With an increasing focus on air-to-air operations, the squadron aims to integrate the Brazilian air defense warning system, subordinate to the air force's Aerospace Operations Command (COMAE). It has the only Brazilian fighters operated outside the air force.

== Aircraft condition ==
=== Initial fleet atrition ===
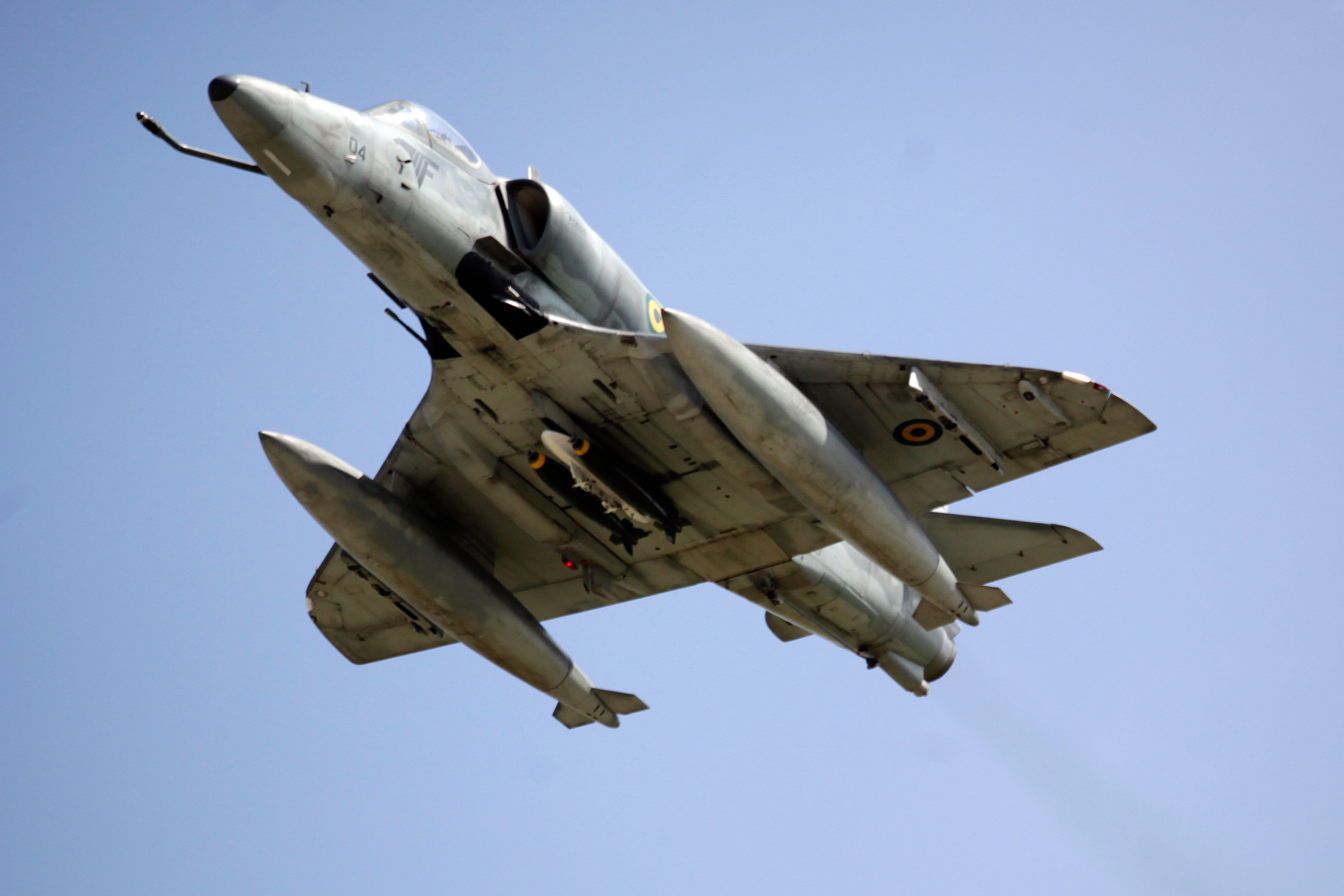
AF-1 armament

In its early years the squadron operated consistently, focused on training a critical mass of pilots. São Paulo operated uninterruptedly from 2001 to 2005 and from then on it suffered several problems, including fatal accidents, undergoing prolonged maintenance periods. The VF-1 operated on board until May 2004. In its entire operational history in Brazil, São Paulo has made less than six hundred Skyhawk launches. At its peak in 2003, no more than half a dozen fighters were embarked at any one time, although the ship had capacity for eighteen aircraft.

Avionics and sensor resources quickly fell into disrepair. Armaments, such as Mk 82 and derivatives, 70mm rockets and Sidewinder missiles, were rudimentary and fighters would depend on external radar guidance for interception. The modernization of the AF-1 was foreseen in the Navy Reequipment Plan drawn up in 2003, but postponed due to lack of resources.

Like the aircraft carrier, the fighters revealed their age: spare parts were expensive and difficult to obtain and engine maintenance support did not exist in Brazil. Flight availability was low and flight hours decreased over time. To keep some fighters running, others were deactivated and had their parts cannibalized. The available fleet gradually shrank. In 2008, with all the navy's assets in critical condition, only two of the planes were capable of flying. In December of that year, a US$5 million contract was signed with Israel Aerospace Industries for the recovery of ten engines. The 2009 Brazilian Navy Equipment and Articulation Plan (PAEMB) provided for the modernization of twelve interception and attack aircraft and the purchase of another 48. The first item materialized in two contracts signed in April of the same year between Embraer and the Navy's Aeronautics Directorate, respectively R$106 million and U$93 million. In this way, the fleet had already suffered the attrition of half of the original 23 fighters.

=== Modernization program ===
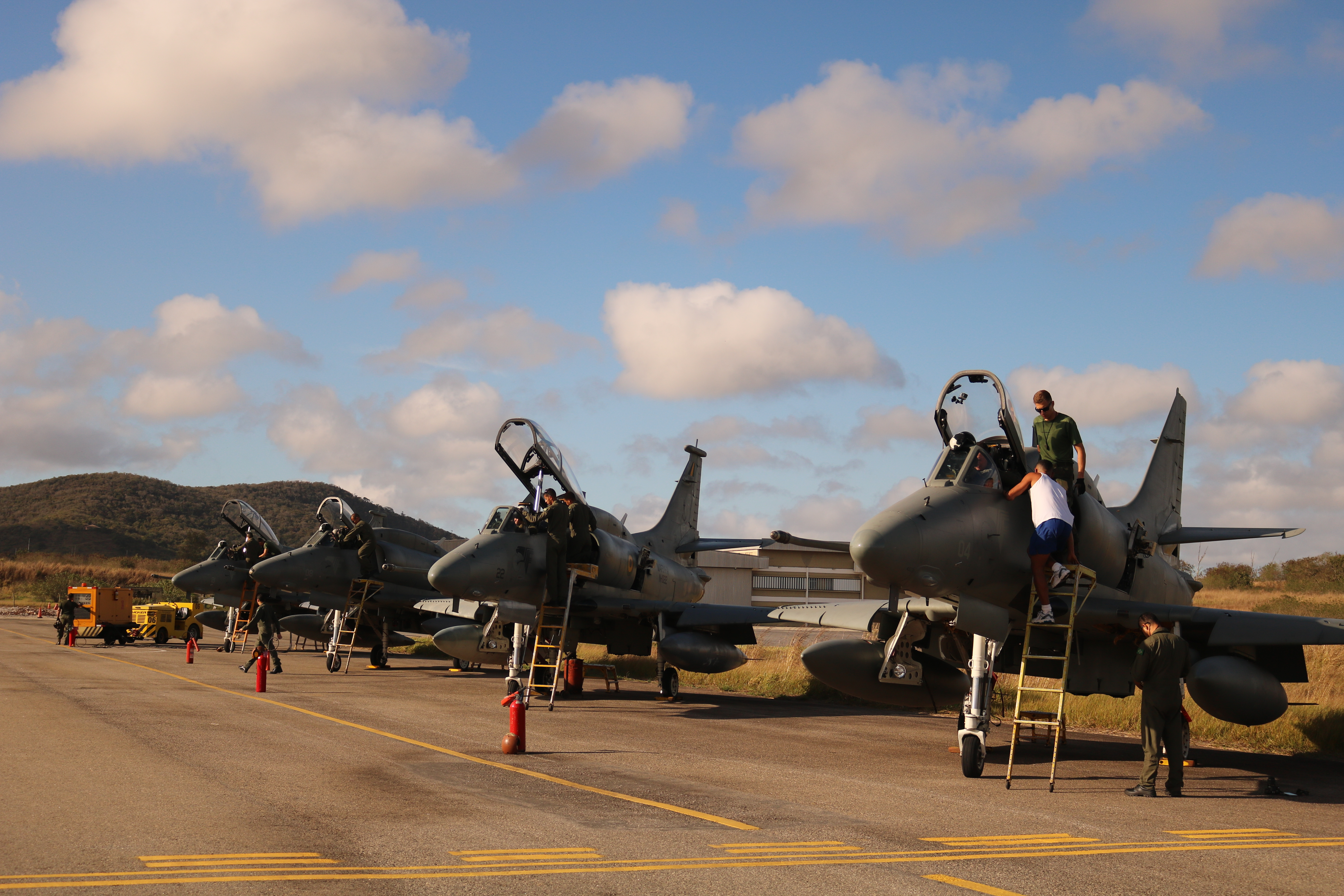
Modernized Skyhawks (AF-1B and AF-1C) on land

The modernization of the planes was linked to the idea of modernizing and reactivating São Paulo, in a reasoning of recovering outdated or deactivated equipment due to budget restrictions. The idea was to keep the Skyhawks flying until 2025, when the navy would receive a new aircraft carrier and a new fighter model, probably a naval version of the Swedish Gripen NG, also chosen by the FAB as part of its FX-2 Project; high commonality would be its main advantage. In November 2011, a confidential report from the Ministry of Defense recorded 100% unavailability in the VF-1, amid high rates of unavailability in the Armed Forces as a whole. The squadron returned to flying in March 2012. In 2014, three fighters operated in the squadron, seven were undergoing modernization at Embraer's facilities in Gavião Peixoto, four were awaiting shipment, eight were yet to be defined, one was on board São Paulo as a mock-up and one served as a monument in São Pedro da Aldeia. Some of the pilots were on exchange with other aviation squadrons.

The program, led by Embraer and the navy with support from the Israeli weapons industry, was focused on replacing analog sensors with digital ones. The modernized versions, called AF-1B (single-seater) and AF-1C (two-seater) by the navy and AF-1M by Embraer, received significant new features: glass cockpit from AEL Sistemas, hands-on-throttle-and-stick controls (HOTAS), EL/M-2032 radar from Elta Systems, radar warning receiver from Elbit Systems, main computer for navigation and ballistics calculations, Rohde & Schwarz M3AR radios, common to the FAB, among others. The aerial vector now had state-of-the-art avionics and on-board systems, providing pilots with situational awareness and familiarity with modern combat aircraft systems.

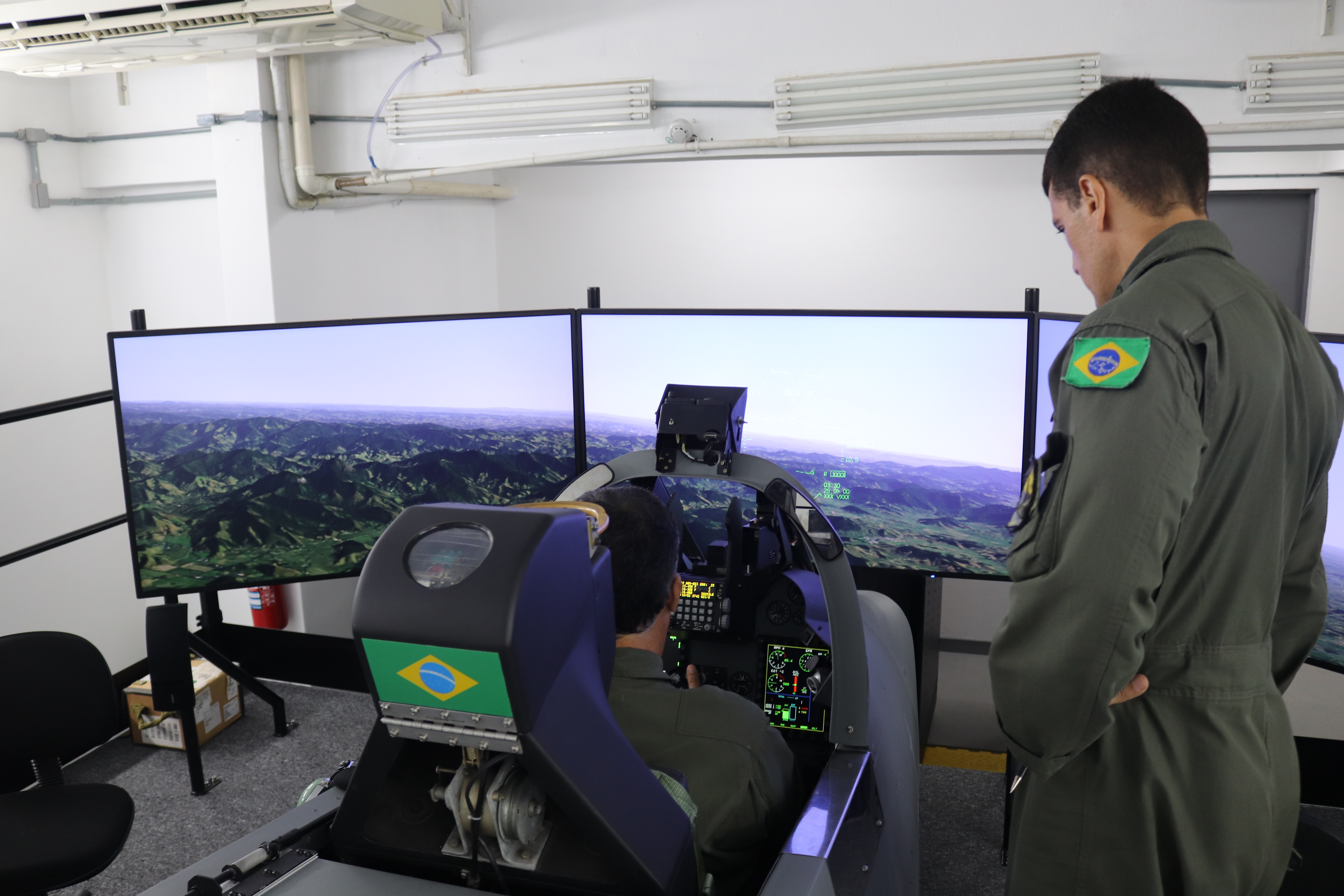
Modernized Skyhawk flight simulator

This was the last modernization in the history of the Skyhawk, and the result has been referred to as the most advanced variant of that aircraft ever developed. Still, different naval authorities disputed the benefits obtained due to the limitations of the modernized version in attacking surface targets. The program enabled aircraft to carry new air-to-air and air-to-ground weapons, but did not in itself include new weapons. The available missiles continued to be the Sidewinder purchased from Kuwait.

The new systems only made older weapons more effective. The Skyhawks did not receive anti-ship missiles, guided bombs, or 5th generation missiles. With new armaments, the AF-1B could be as capable as the FAB's modernized F-5EM/FM. The new radar allows interception with beyond visual range (BVR) air-to-air missiles. The navy studied several new missiles, such as the Derby BVR; the Sidewinder AIM-9X Block I, MAA-1B Piranha, A-Darter or Python, for air-to-air at shorter range; and the AGM-84 Harpoon, AM 39 (Exocet version), or an air-to-surface version of the MAN-1, of local production, against ships; a Skyhawk with Python and Derby missiles would have considerable combat power. In addition to missiles, guided bombs could be purchased along with modern guidance systems. Possibly the VF-1 would use FAB missiles through a General Technical-Operational Cooperation Agreement signed between the navy and air force in 2014.

In 2020, these considerations remained only under study; according to Asas magazine, the existing armament "is not aligned with the technologies and demands of modern aerial warfare or even with the capabilities installed on the plane with the modernization process", despite the radar, with a range of 160 kilometers for naval targets, being useful in the maritime clarification. The assessment in Tecnologia & Defesa magazine in 2017 was that the program was costly and time-consuming and the result had "little military effectiveness as a weapons system".

=== Future ===
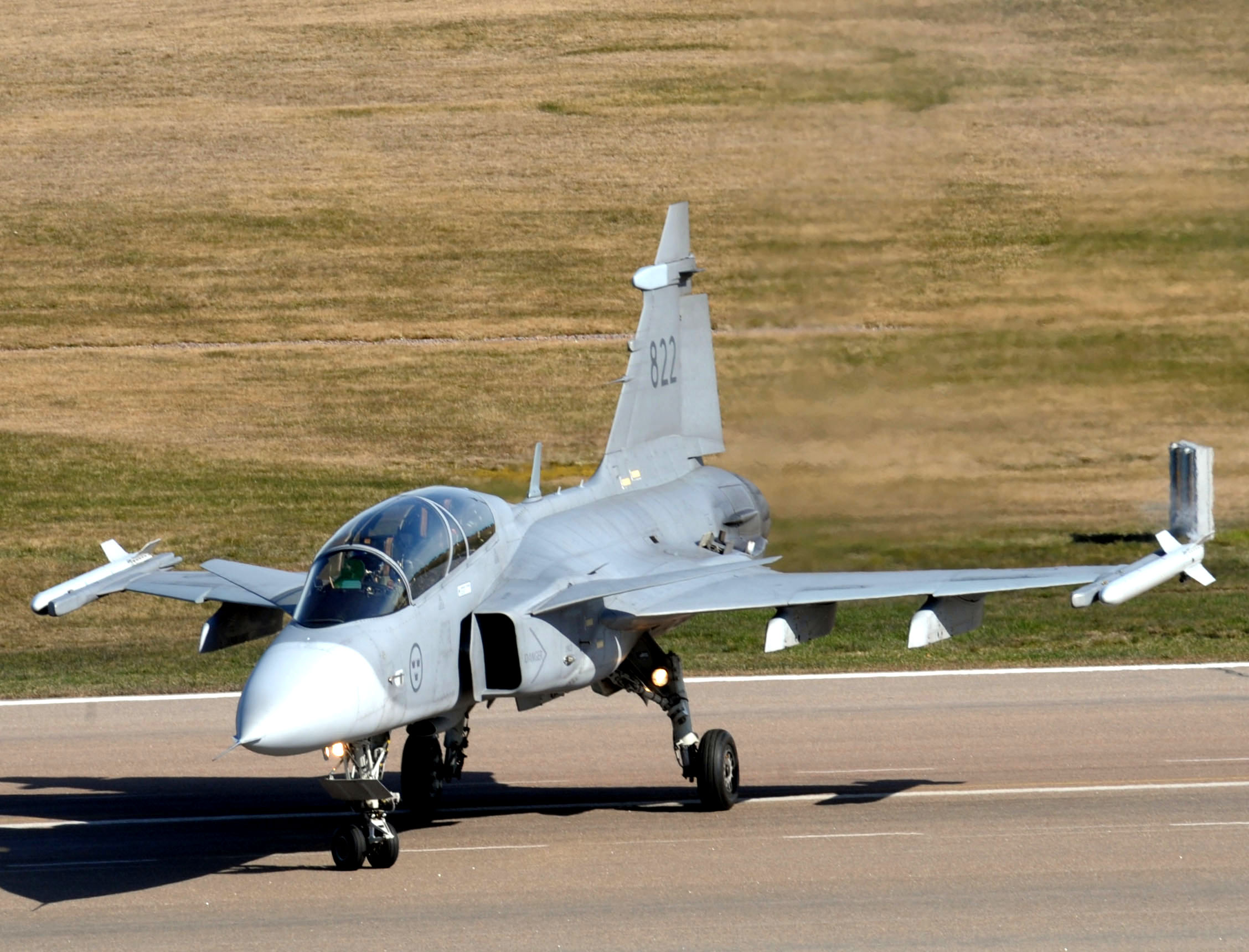
Gripen NG, the hypothetical successor to the Skyhawk in VF-1

The first two modernized AF-1Bs, the N-1001 and N-1011, were delivered in 2015 and 2016. They collided during training on 26 July 2016, 44 kilometers off the coast of Saquarema, Rio de Janeiro. N-1011 was lost and its pilot died, while N-1001 returned to base and was repaired by Embraer. Thus, in 2017 the VF-1 operated with two AF-1s and one AF-1A, sometimes with an additional AF-1, none of which were modernized.

The decommissionig of São Paulo in 2017, after more than a decade inoperative, placed the future of VF-1 in limbo. What justifies the existence of these aircraft is the aircraft carrier, but it had been inoperative for more than a decade, and now there was no possibility of training operations on board in Brazil. The only options would be pilot exchanges in the navies of the United States and France, the only other countries with CATOBAR system aircraft carriers. Without the training, the pilots' proficiency in embarked operations would be lost and the squadron would gradually become like any land-based fighter unit, creating an argument for its deactivation. At that time, the navy had plans for the naval version of the Gripen and the purchase of a new aircraft carrier, but the country's economic crisis and greater priorities (submarines and frigates) made their realization unlikely.

The remaining Skyhawks cannot take off from NAM Atlântico, purchased by the navy in place of São Paulo. The only option for this ship would be to invest in AV-8B Harrier short/vertical takeoff jets and significant changes to the ship to be able to operate them. In 2020, the navy was still studying the naval Gripen, which would become available at the end of the decade, or the F/A-18 Hornet, obtained from retired stocks in the United States or Kuwait, in the second half of the decade. The technological advance would be great, but in the absence of an aircraft carrier, there is a risk of opposition from the FAB, which sees itself responsible for all jets taking off from land runways.

In February 2018, faced with budget constraints and the deactivation of the aircraft carrier, the modernization program was reduced to just six aircraft (four AF-1B and two AF-1C). Counting the AF-1B lost in the crash in 2016, there were seven modernized fighters in total. N-1013 left the BAeNSPA runway on 21 October 2019 and was damaged after a fire broke out, but was recovered with support from Embraer. The last of the six modernized aircraft was received in March 2022. Their numbers are N-1001, N-1004, N-1008 and N-1013, for the AF-1B, and N-1022 and N-1023, for the AF-1C. There were six pilots that year. The expectation is to operate the Skyhawks until 2030.

== Participation in exercises ==
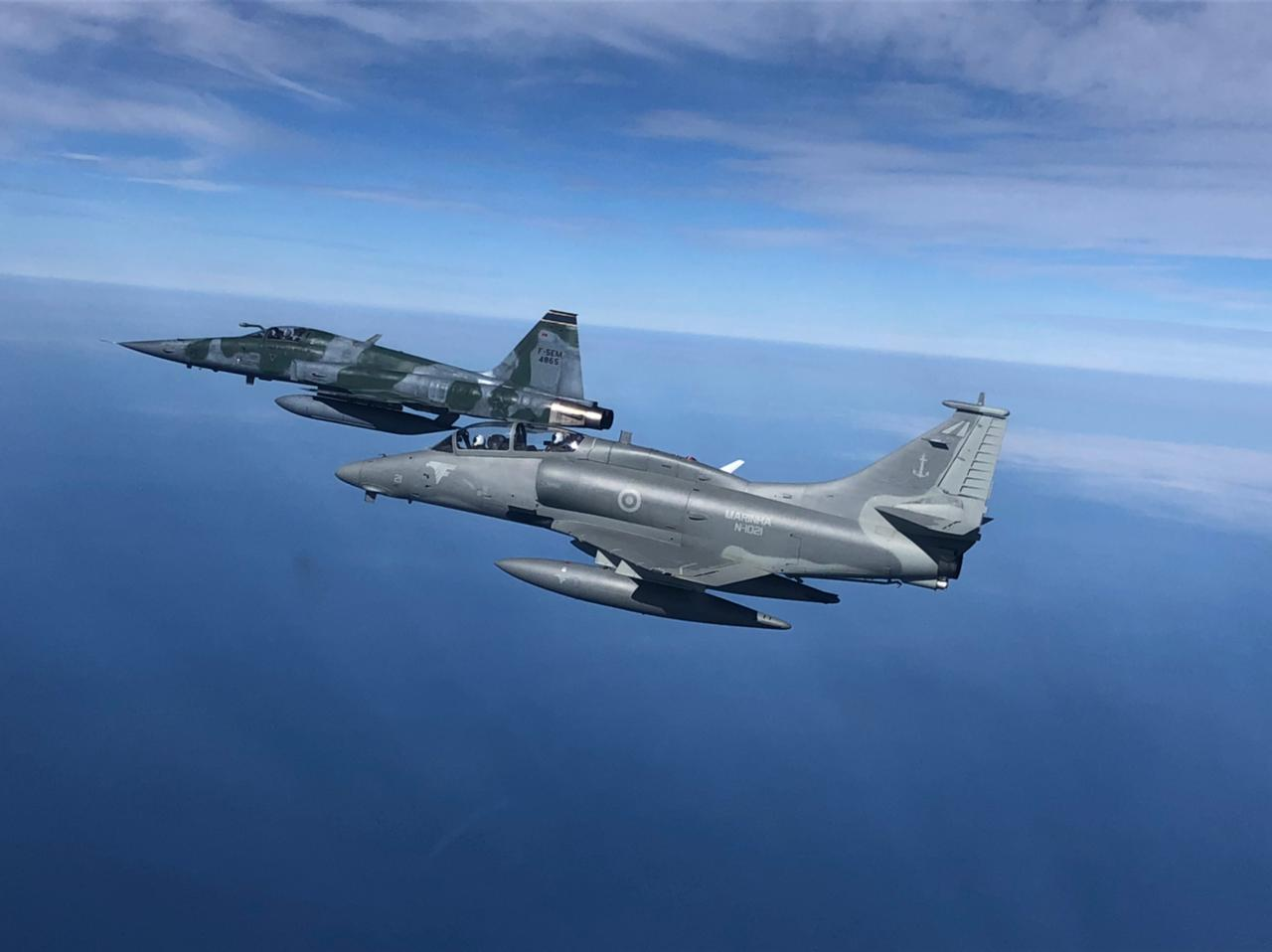
Joint training of a Brazilian Navy AF-1C with a FAB F-5M

Without continuous training, the skills of a naval aviator are quickly lost. Thus, the squadron participates in various navy and FAB exercises and operations, such as transit under aerial threat, to verify the functioning of the anti-aircraft defense of the ships; the Aspirantex, a practical demonstration of naval and air resources for aspirants at the Naval Academy; the real bomb dropping campaigns, carried out twice a year, and the close air support to the Marine Corps in Operation Formosa, in Goiás.

An off-site campaign of typical duration and logistical mobilization took place from 5 November to 20 December 2019. The number of locations visited in the short period of time was unprecedented: in addition to BAeNSPA, an AF-1B and AF-1C operated from FAB bases in Natal, Rio Grande do Norte, and Belém, Pará. Coordinating with naval assets, they reached distant islands such as the Rocas Atoll, Fernando de Noronha and the Saint Peter and Saint Paul archipelago. Training with the FAB, especially in air-to-air combat, is common. VF-1 frequently operates in Natal and has been to Santa Maria and Canoas, in Rio Grande do Sul, Santa Cruz, Rio Grande do Norte, Anápolis, Goiás and Campo Grande, Mato Grosso do Sul. An AF-1B and an AF-1C participated in the Cruzex 2018 Multinational Exercise, in which the FAB hosted aircraft from thirteen countries.
