= Link-BR2 =

Brazilian military datalink

The Link-BR2 is a Brazilian military datalink developed by the Brazilian Air Force and the defence company AEL Sistemas. The system entered in operation in December 2020, and was conceived in the early-2010s, by the necessity of the Armed Forces of a communication system to the exchange of information between all military of the country.

The Link-BR2 allow the exchange of data such radar information, videos and images with other units of the three branches anytime and anywhere, using an advanced encrypted protocol with a high degree of security. In the Air Force, the F-39E Gripen, F-5M, A1-M and the A-29 Super Tucano, will operate this system. The E-99 AEW&C and facilities in the ground also will be part of the datalink. Other air units are the UAVs and the KC-390 in active service and the future A330 MRTTs to planned service for 2022.

A major part of the tests campaign was conducted by the Fourteenth Aviation Group (1º/14º GAV) based in the Canoas Air Force Base in the Rio Grade do Sul state.
