= CINDACTA =

Air traffic control centers of Brazil

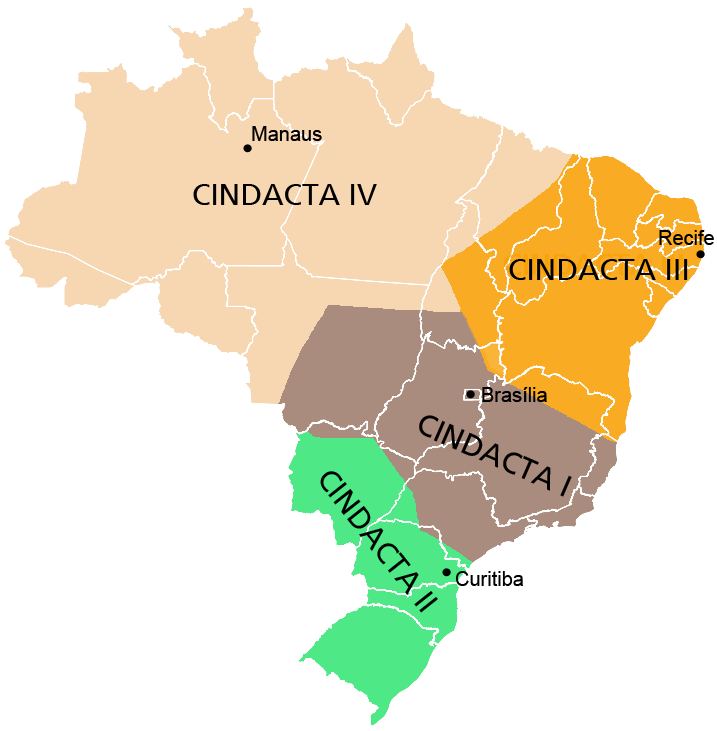
CINDACTAs in Brazil

The air traffic control centers of Brazil are known by the acronym CINDACTA, or "Centro Integrado de Defesa Aérea e Controle de Tráfego Aéreo (Integrated Air Traffic Control and Air Defense Center). Four CINDACTAs are in operation, located in four cities and each responsible for different regions of Brazil's airspace.

- Cindacta I located in Brasília, near Pres. Juscelino Kubitschek International Airport: the square comprising Rio de Janeiro, São Paulo, Belo Horizonte and Brasília
- Cindacta II located in Curitiba, near Bacacheri Airport: Southern Region, Mato Grosso do Sul and the southern part of São Paulo
- Cindacta III located in Recife, near Recife/Guararapes-Gilberto Freyre International Airport: Northeast Region and the ocean between Brazil and Africa and Europe
- Cindacta IV located in Manaus, near Eduardo Gomes International Airport: Brazilian Amazon Region

The use of military air traffic controllers for civilian traffic is not unusual. In the US, the Federal Aviation Administration (FAA) operates a wholly parallel system with that of the US Air Force and NORAD. This is also the case of Eurocontrol and each of its member nations' air defense systems. Brazil's use of an integrated command poses some unique challenges to the government. As members of the military, controllers are not allowed to form unions (such as the case of NATCA in the US) or to strike.

== See also ==
- Aerospace Operations Command
