= Aerospace Operations Command =

Brazilian air and space command

- Comando de Operações Aeroespaciais
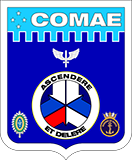
- Coat of arms
- Active: 2017; 9 years ago
- Country: Brazil
- Type: Air and space command
- Part of: Brazilian Air Force
- Garrison/HQ: Brasília, Federal District
- Nickname: COMAE
- Mottos: Ascendere Et Delere (Latin for "Ascend and Destroy")

The Aerospace Operations Command (Portuguese: Comando de Operações Aeroespaciais, COMAE) is a joint command of the Brazilian Armed Forces overseeing all non-training flights by Brazilian Air Force aircraft, and more broadly, the planning, coordination and employment of aerospace assets. It is the central body in the Brazilian Aerospace Defense System (Portuguese: Sistema de Defesa Aeroespacial Brasileiro, SISDABRA) and as such, is directly responsible for the aerospace defense of Brazilian territory and may control Air Force, Army and Navy units. COMAE is part of the Air Force (FAB)'s structure, but includes personnel from the two other services.

SISDABRA detects aerial threats through Integrated Air Defense and Air Traffic Control Centers (Portuguese: Centros Integrados de Defesa Aérea e Controle de Tráfego Aéreo, CINDACTA), an infrastructure it shares with the Department of Airspace Control's civilian activities. The central body also controls communications and command and control systems and can then direct active aerospace defenses (interceptor aircraft and air defense forces).

Upon its creation in 2017, COMAE inherited roles from the former Brazilian Aerospace Defense Command (Portuguese: Comando de Defesa Aeroespacial Brasileiro, COMDABRA) and General Air Operations Command (Portuguese: Comando-Geral de Operações Aéreas, COMGAR). Its purpose within the Air Force is comparable to the Army's Land Operations Command and the Navy's Naval Operations Command: it has no subordinate assets and controls whichever units are assigned to it according to its current task. Therefore, beyond aerospace defense, its missions include airlift, search and rescue, maritime patrol and joint Ministry of Defense operations.

== Predecessors ==
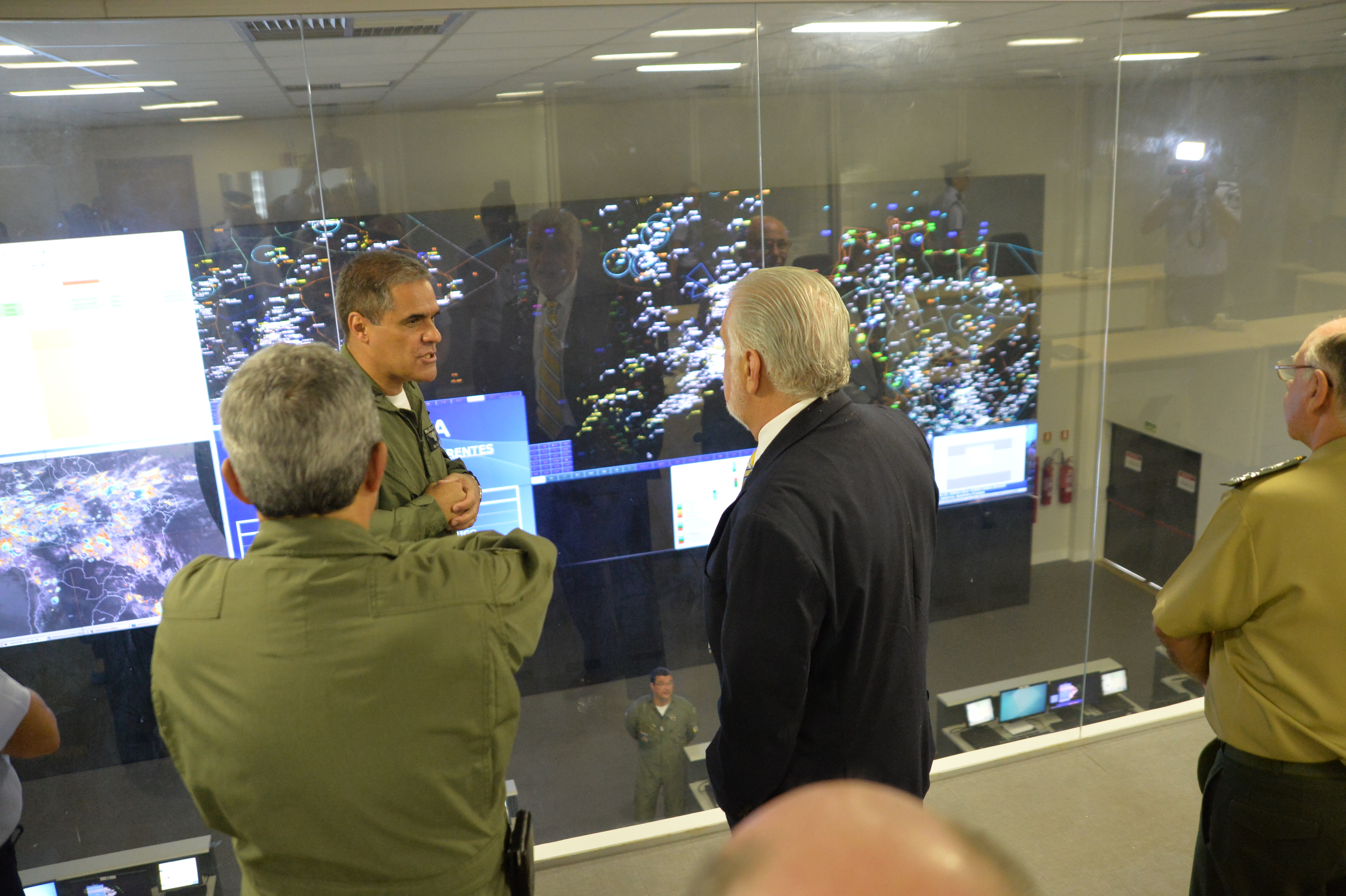
Defense Minister Jaques Wagner visits COMDABRA

COMAE was created in 2017, replacing the former COMDABRA, and absorbed part of the roles of its higher command, the COMGAR, also disbanded in a wide-ranging reorganization of the Brazilian Air Force's order of battle. COMGAR was the "air force's air force", the structure effectively responsible for operational activities, but it was also burdened with force preparation and support. It was the most important military department in the former Air Ministry (Portuguese: Ministério da Aeronáutica) and commanded most of its air units. Combat assets were mostly in two subdivisions, the Aerotactical Command and COMDABRA, the latter consisting of only a single unit, the Anápolis-based 1st Air Defense Group.

COMDABRA was planned since 1980 as a central body for SISDABRA and implemented from 1989 onward. The usage of "aerospace" in its title in lieu of "aerial" is common in FAB organizations such as the Aerospace Science and Technology Department, the Aerospace Museum and the Postgraduate Program in Aerospace Science. Brazilian military doctrine describes the FAB as an instrument of "aerospace power", not just airpower. Nonetheless, even the FAB's commander in 2017, brigadier Nivaldo Rossato, confessed at an interview that "we've used [...] this expression for a long time. But we look very little towards space".

The Brazilian Air Force defines SISDABRA as a set of organizations whose assets or activities may be employed to ensure sovereignty in Brazilian airspace. It encompasses surveillance (long-range radars), telecommunications, command and control and active and passive aerospace defense systems from all three branches of the Armed Forces and even from public administration. These elements may be permanent or occasional links in the system. The central body exercises "operational control" over the links, which is a more limited authority than "operational command". For instance, the central body has no logistical responsibility over the forces it employs, but dictates technical norms to ensure their interoperability.

COMDABRA was staffed by Air Force, Navy and Army personnel. The Ministry of Defense's 2011 Joint Operations Doctrine therefore defined COMDABRA and the Cybernetic Defense Command (Portuguese: Comando de Defesa Cibernética, COMDCIBER) as the only permanently active joint commands. Other joint commands may be activated in moments of crisis. The permanent status of aerospace defense owes itself to the very short reaction time needed to resist aerial threats.

== Organization and roles ==
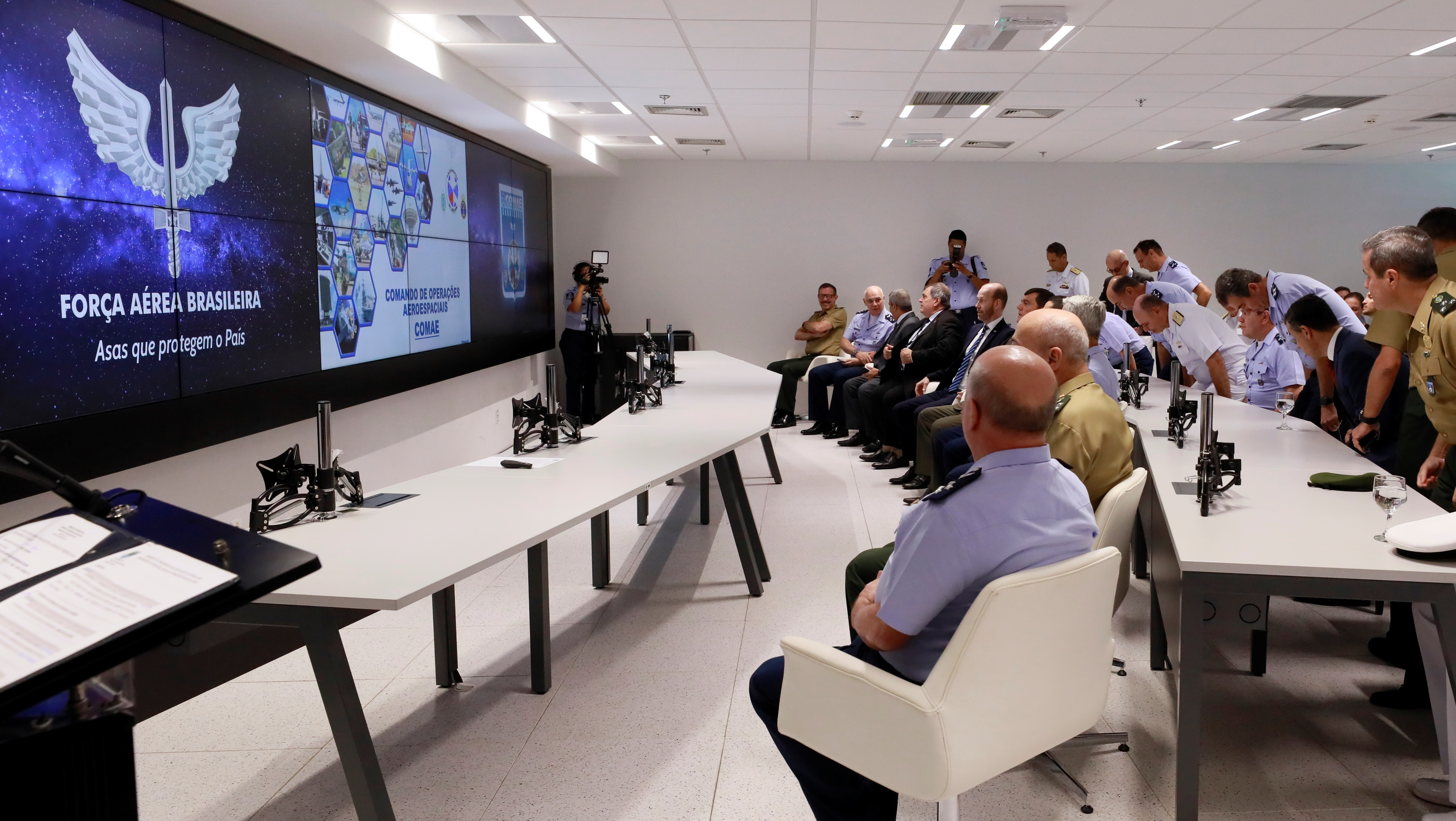
Military authorities oversee satellite launches at COMAE's Space Operations Center

The Air Force's 2017 reorganization aimed to disconnect the Air Force's employment from its preparation, relieving units of their administrative, financial and logistical burdens so they could concentrate on air operations. These two major areas of the former COMGAR's responsibilities were split between two new commands, COMAE and COMPREP (Preparation Command, Portuguese: Comando de Preparo), both subordinated to the Air Force Command (Portuguese: Comando da Aeronáutica, COMAER). Tactical-level military units (wings), which oversee air squadrons, may operate under either COMPREP or COMAE control. COMAE has no subordinate units and merely uses units assigned to it as needed. Air defense, airborne early warning and control and search and rescue assets are permanently assigned.

As the Air Force's employment command, it is comparable to the Army's Land Operations Command and the Navy's Naval Operations Command. But unlike the two other services, the Air Force centralizes more control within COMAE. As one general describes:

Today all of the Air Force's operational assets are in the hands of COMAE, in Brasília. An aircraft won't take off for an operation, and I'm not talking of training, from anywhere in the country [...] without being coordinated by this strategic air command [...] With this, we've centralized the coordination and management of our assets [...] This command is permanently activated and can be said to be the true commander of war [...] Everytime there's an operation such as the one begun here, Operation Verde Brasil, to fight forest fires, or the extraction of Venezuelan [refugees], COMAE is in command. With this, we're making use of, managing our assets because the Air Force can't regionalize all of its assets. We don't have the C 130, a cargo aircraft, in the northern region, but they're always operating here, providing logistical support. They're based in Rio de Janeiro and, under COMAE's command, cater to the Amazon the south or wherever else's demands [...] I wanted to contextualize this because, unlike the Navy and the Army, we have a concept of flexibility and operation in the entire national territory.

Its mission is officially defined as the "planning, coordination and conduction of the employment of National Aerospace Power". As heir to COMDABRA, COMAE has remained the joint command and central body of SISDABRA, and therefore, is directly responsible for the aerospace defense of Brazilian territory. And as heir to COMGAR and the four numbered air forces (Portuguese: Força Aérea, FAE), its missions also include airborne logistics, search and rescue, maritime patrol and joint Ministry of Defense operations. For instance, in search and rescue operations, it is COMAE which provides aircraft upon request. In 2023 COMAE formed the air component command in the federal response to the Yanomami humanitarian crisis.

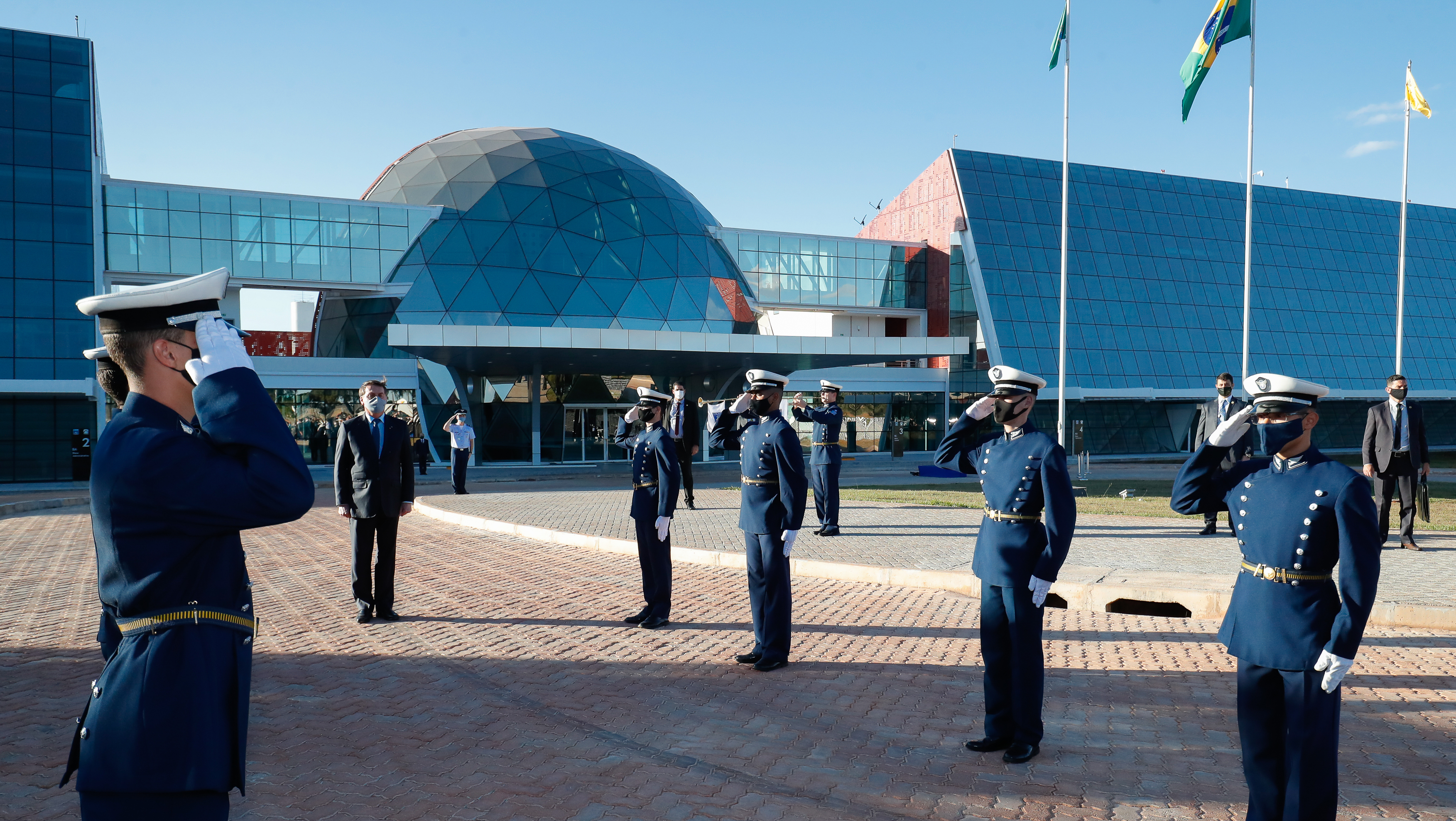
Centro de Operações Espaciais Principal (COPE-P) in Brasília

Unmanned aerial vehicles, communications satellites, future low orbit satellite constellations and their associated intelligence structure are also under COMAE's authority. Its structure includes two Space Operations Centers (COPEs): the main center (COPE-P) in Brasília and the secondary center (COPE-S) in Rio de Janeiro, both of which form the land component of the Satellite Military Communications System (Portuguese: Sistema de Comunicações Militares por Satélite, SISCOMIS) and operate the Geostationary Satellite for Defense and Strategic Communications.

COMAE is headed by a tenente-brigadeiro (four-star Air Force general) and composed of a Cabinet, Command Support Sections and a Joint General Staff. The latter, commanded by a major-brigadeiro (three-star Air Force general), is composed of a Joint Aerospace Operations Center (Portuguese: Centro Conjunto de Operações Aeroespaciais, CCOA), a Space Operations Center (Portuguese: Centro de Operações Espaciais, COPE), a Joint Operational Intelligence Center (Portuguese: Centro Conjunto Operacional de Inteligência, CCOI) an Institutional Planning, Budget and Management Center (Portuguese: Centro de Planejamento, Orçamento e Gestão Institucionais, CPOGI). and the units under its operational control. It is staffed by all three services. As of 2023, 24 Army officers and sergeants served in this structure, including a brigade general in command of the CCOI.

== Assets ==
=== Early warning ===
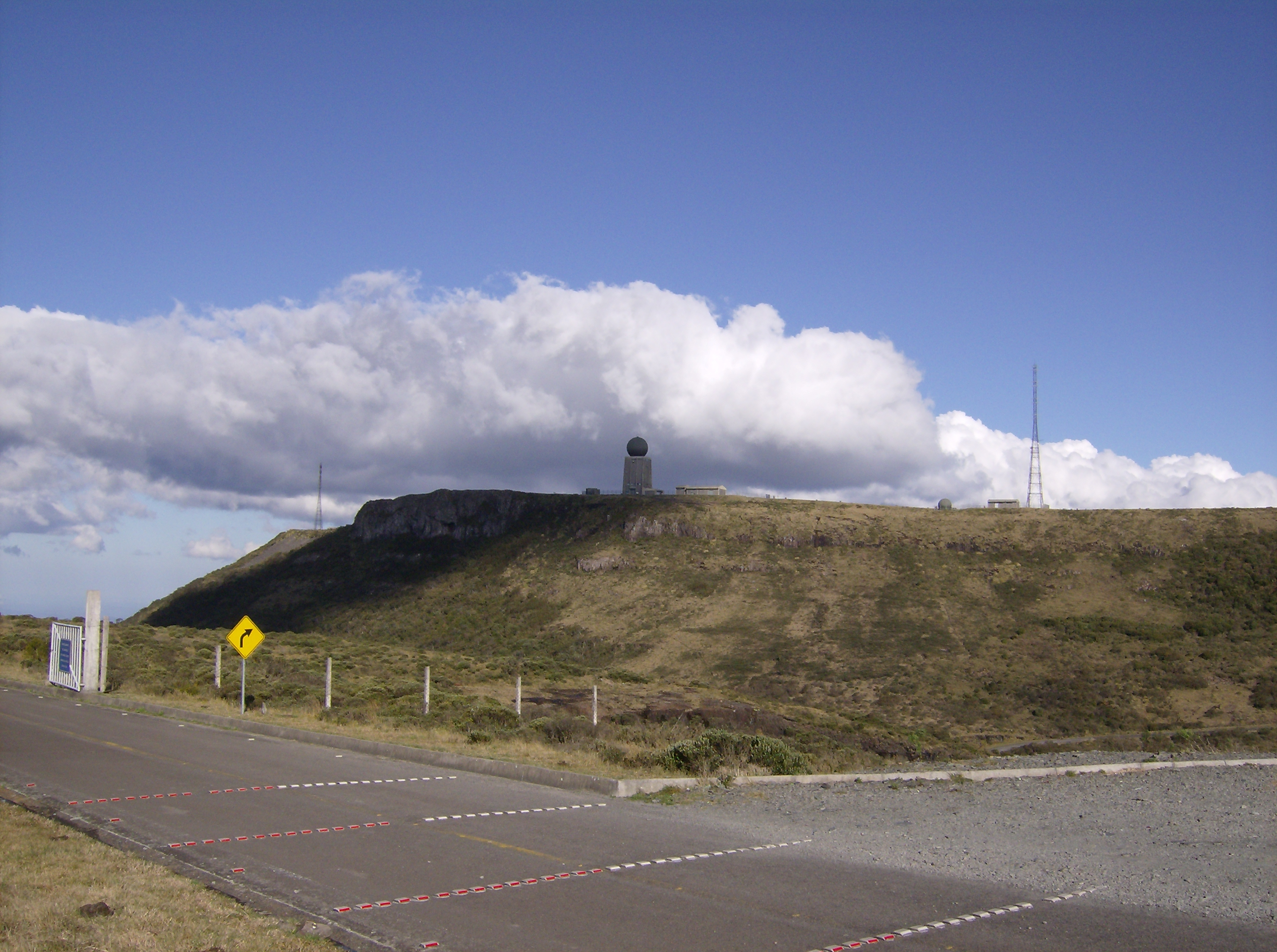
One of CINDACTA's detachments in Morro da Igreja, Santa Catarina

The Air Force's four Integrated Air Defense and Air Traffic Control Centers (CINDACTAs) are among SISDABRA's key permanent links, complemented by airborne early warning and reconnaissance aircraft such as the Embraer E-99 and R-99. Through their radar coverage and command and control assets, the CINDACTs inform the CCOA of the situation in their respective airspaces, allowing COMAE to permanently track all aerial movements within Brazilian airspace.

This infrastructure is double-purpose, as it is shared with the Brazilian Airspace Control System (Portuguese: Sistema de Controle do Espaço Aéreo Brasileiro, SISCEAB), whose main body is the Department of Airspace Control. The same personnel and budget serve military and civilian purposes. This Brazilian peculiarity was inherited from the pre-1999 Ministry of the Air Force and its centralization of military and civilian air traffic control activities which developed in separation in other countries.

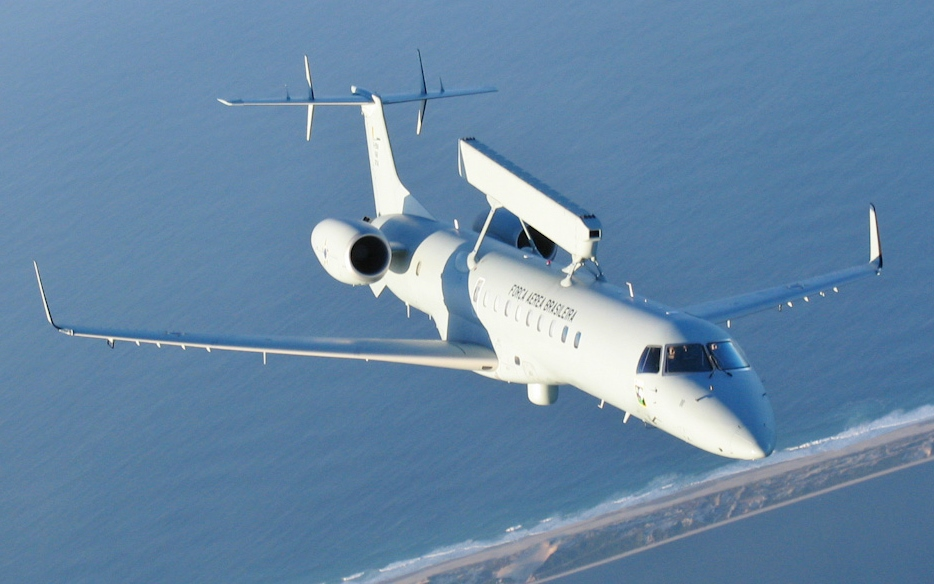
FAB R-99 in flight

According to the FAB, Brazil's territory has full radar coverage in the altitude range most often used by commercial aviation, at 30,000 feet (9.1 km), but there are areas of limited detection below 20 thousand feet. This is a physical limitation inherent to ground-based radar due to the Earth's curvature. The Air Force denies accusations of a "black hole" in the Amazonian airspace, as claimed in the media at the time of the 2006 aviation crisis. Irregular flights by miners, drug smugglers and others take advantage of this limitation by flying at low altitude. This makes airborne warning aircraft and their high-altitude radar systems particularly relevant to detect them. The E-99 and R-99 are flown by the 2nd Squadron, 6th Aviation Group based at Anápolis.

The integration of warship radars to SISDABRA was still a hypothesis when the topic was examined by a Naval War School (Portuguese: Escola de Guerra Naval) monograph in 2010. On the other hand, the SABER anti-aircraft artillery radars were developed from the very beginning with a possible integration to SISDABRA in mind.

SISDABRA, SISCEAB, SisGAAz (Blue Amazon Management System, Portuguese: Sistema de Gerenciamento da Amazônia Azul) and SISFRON (Integrated Border Management System, Portuguese: Sistema Integrado de Monitoramento de Fronteiras) are the Armed Forces' major surveillance and control systems. A hypothetical integration between SISDABRA, SisGAAz (which is organized by the Navy) and SISFRON (organized by the Army) is discussed since the 2012 National Defense White Paper.

=== Aircraft ===
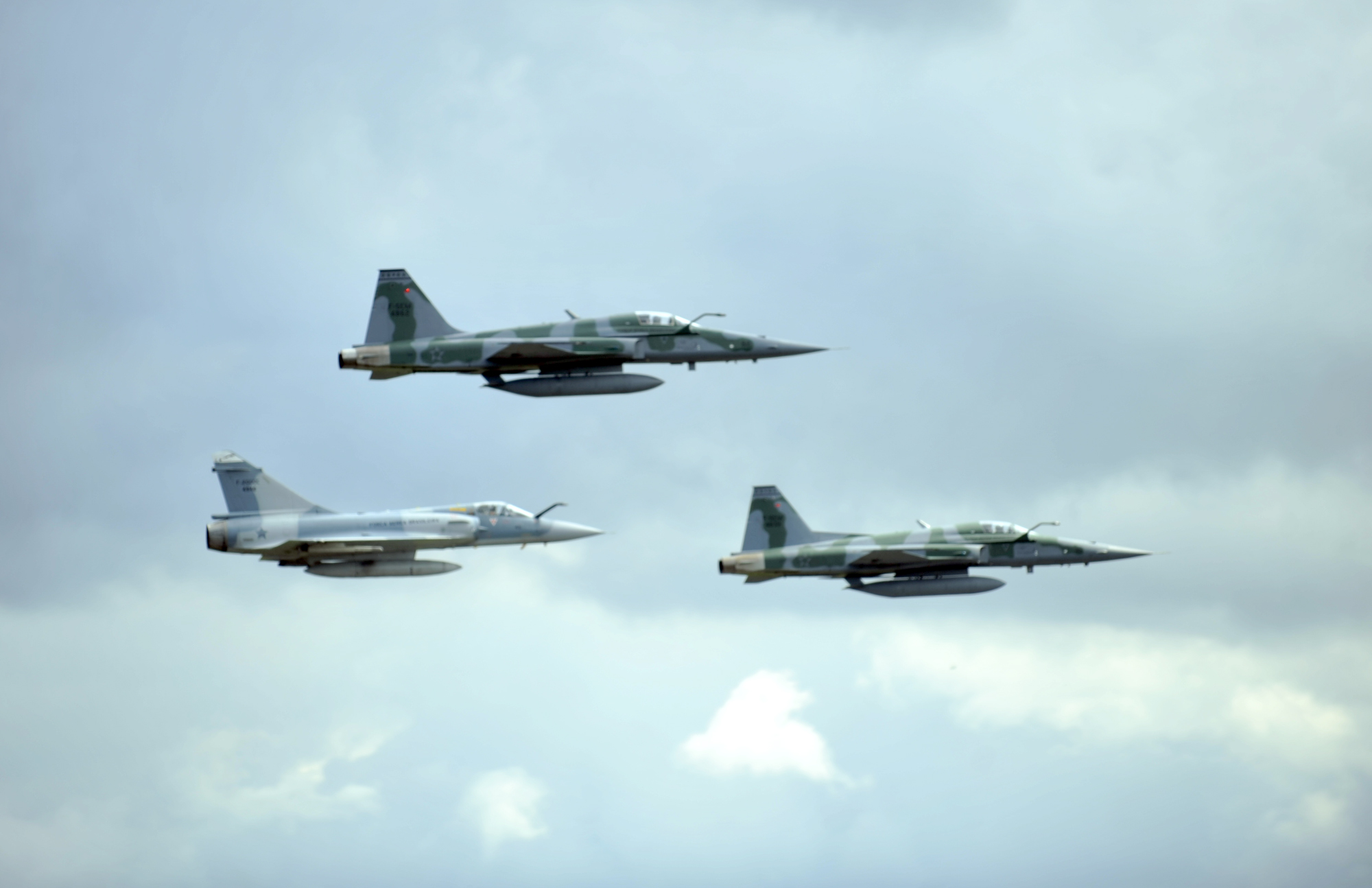
FAB Mirage 2000 and F-5 in 2014

The Air Force's air defense and airborne early warning and control units are permanent links in SISDABRA. Interceptor aircraft in such units are active aerospace defense assets. Since before COMDABRA's founding, this role was covered by Mirage III fighters, the first supersonic aircraft in the region. Shortly afterwards, they were complemented by F-5 fighters. After the Mirage III's deactivation, the Air Force leased the Mirage 2000 until its FX-2 Project defined the F-5's successor, which was the Gripen NG.

Naval Aviation may be an occasional link in SISDABRA. The Navy's 2004 Basic Doctrine envisioned the possibility of an "Aerospace Defense Naval Force" to destroy aircraft carriers and enemy aircraft in their bases. What it had in mind was the São Paulo aircraft carrier and its air wing. Aerial operations in this carrier were brief, but even after its decommissioning, the 1st Interceptor and Strike Fighter Squadron, created for carrier operations, remained active. As of 2020, participating in the Brazilian air defense system was still one of the squadron's ambitions and it was increasing its air-to-air combat training.

=== Anti-aircraft artillery ===
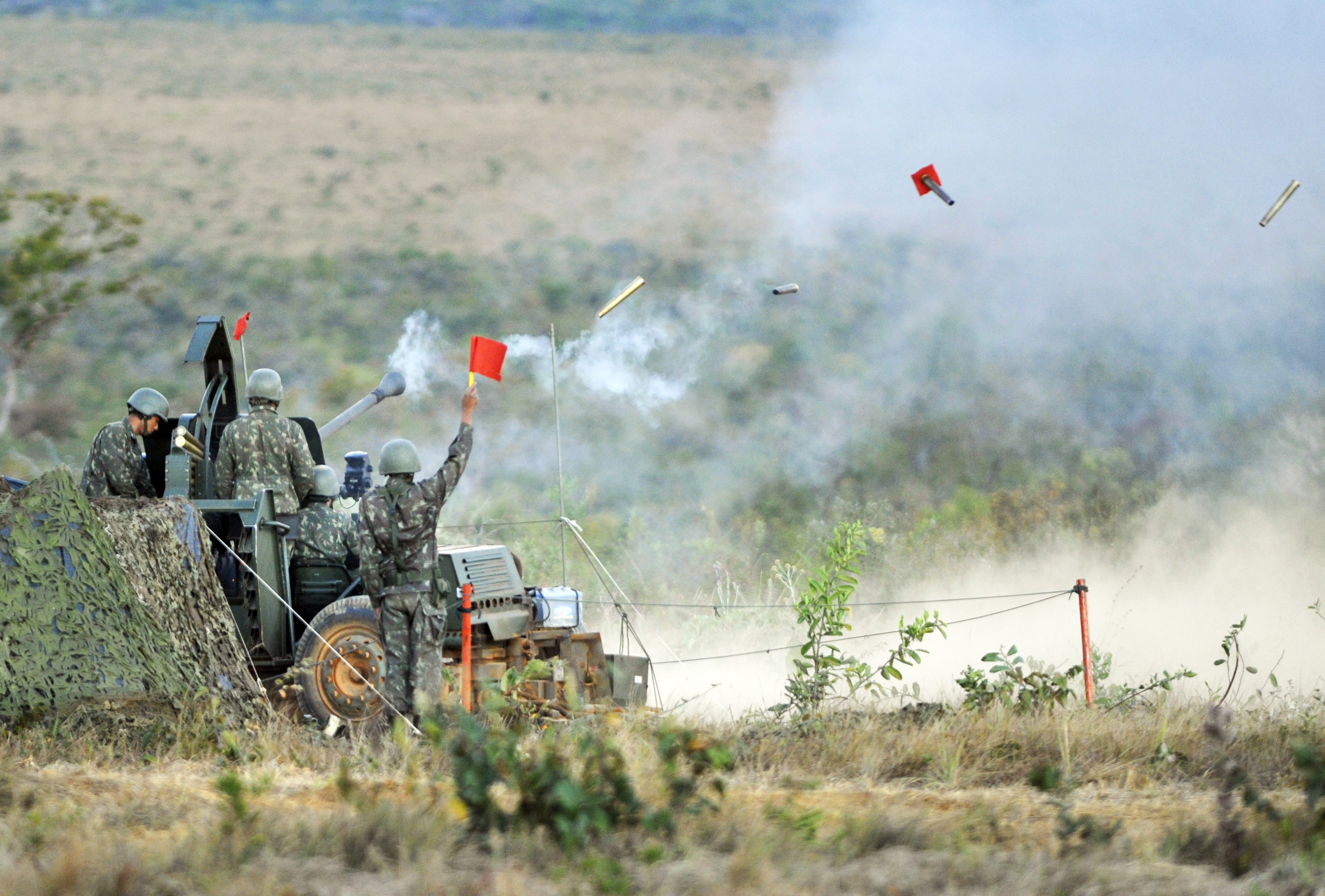
Army anti-aircraft artillery exercise

Anti-aircraft defense is another aspect of active aerospace defense. The Air Force infantry anti-aircraft defense units and the Army's Anti-Aircraft Defense Command are permanent links within SISDABRA. The Navy's anti-aircraft defense may participate as an occasional link, either through ships used in local anti-aircraft defense or through the Brazilian Marine Corps' Aerotactical Control and Anti-Aircraft Defense Battalion. In any case, the Army, Air Force and marines exclusively employ short-range air defense systems, and medium range/medium altitude defenses are a gap in their capabilities. The Ministry of Defense has an ongoing project to acquire anti-aircraft missiles of this kind for all three branches of the Armed Forces.

The relationship between aerospace defenses in multiple branches can be demonstrated by COMAE's 2019 Anti-aircraft Shield Exercise. Air Force and Navy aircraft simulated an aerial attack, which was detected by the usual surveillance systems as well as ship radars from the helicopter carrier Atlântico and frigate Liberal. Army and Air Force anti-aircraft defenses simulated their reaction as part of SISDABRA.

== See also ==
- Brazilian Space Agency
