= AEL Sistemas =

Brazilian defence electronics company

AEL Sistemas S.A.
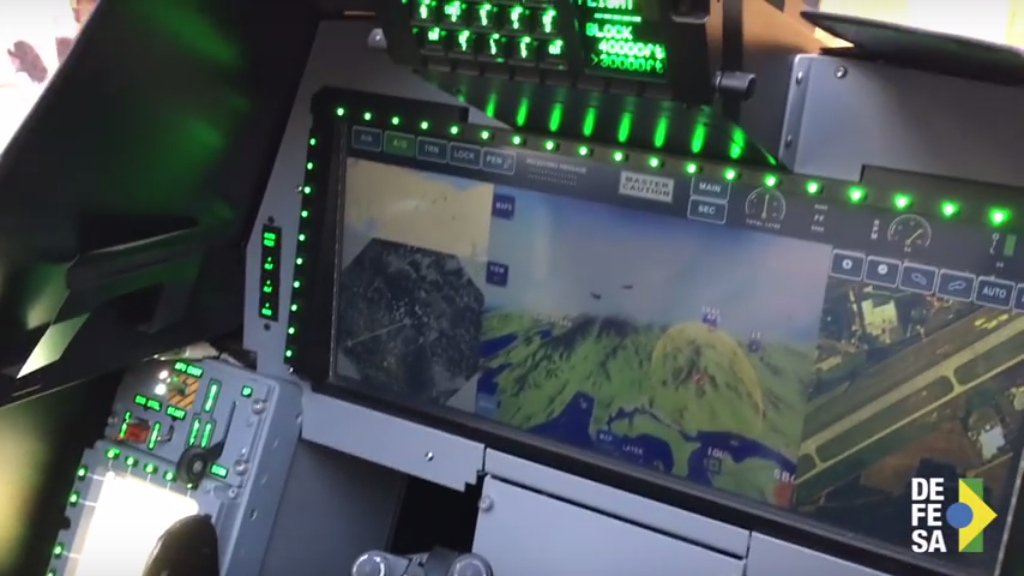
- Replica of Gripen NG cockpit with the Wide Area Display (WAD)
- Company type: Sociedade Anônima
- Founded: 1982
- Headquarters: Porto Alegre, Rio Grande do Sul, Brazil
- Key people: Sérgio Horta
- Number of employees: 500(2020)
- Parent: Elbit Systems
- Website: http://www.ael.com.br/

AEL Sistemas S.A. is a Brazilian-based defence electronics company. The company is a subsidiary of Elbit Systems with 25 percent acquired by the Embraer's defense division. AEL operates in the areas of fixed and rotary wings, unmanned vehicles, homeland security, armored vehicles, communication systems, contracted of logistics support, space systems and simulators.

AEL Sistemas participates of the transfer of technology program of Gripen NG, and will supply its avionics with innovative features such as a "wide area display" (WAD), a panoramic 19 by 8 inches touchscreen display similar to Lockheed F-35 panoramic cockpit display.

The company also developed the Link-BR2, a datalink with an advanced encrypted protocol and high degree of security, that allow the exchange of data such radar information, videos and images with other units of the three branches anytime and anywhere. Very few countries in the world developed this type of communication system.
