= Brazilian Air Force General Staff =

Brazilian space command

- Estado-Maior da Aeronáutica
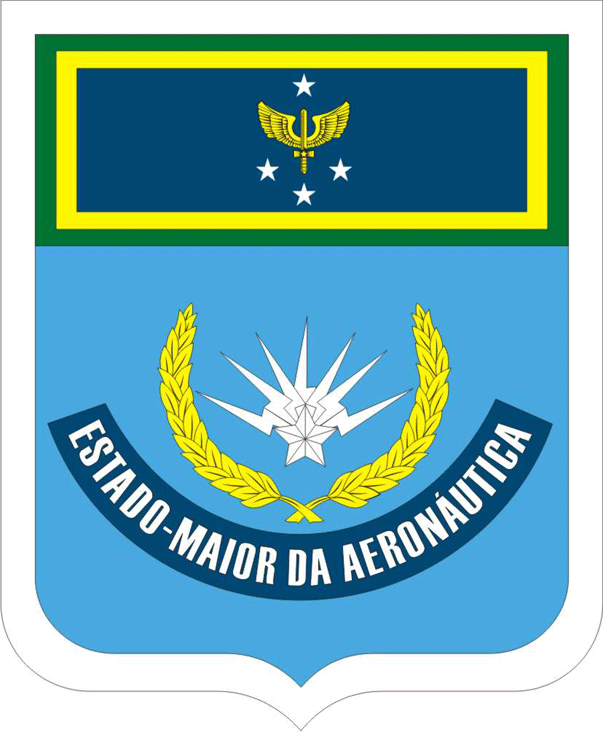
- Coat of arms of EMAER
- Active: 1941; 85 years ago
- Country: Brazil
- Type: General management body
- Part of: Brazilian Air Force
- Garrison/HQ: Brasília, DF
- Nickname: EMAER

Commanders
- Current: John Tadeu Fiorentini

The Brazilian Air Force General Staff (Portuguese: Estado-Maior da Aeronáutica - EMAER) is the general management body responsible for the coordination of the Brazilian Air Force, a branch of the Brazilian Armed Forces.

== History ==
The Air Force General Staff was created by decree-law no. 3,730, of October 18, 1941 and article 7 of federal decree no. 60,521, of March 31, 1967, defined it as an organ of the then Ministry of Aeronautics whose purpose is the forecasting, conception, planning, coordination, supervision and general guidance of the Ministry's activities. Its current structure is defined by federal decree no. 11,237, of October 18, 2022. Regarding the official name, the sole paragraph of article 2 of the regulation created by decree no. 64,283, of March 31, 1969, says that the Air Force General Staff is also the General Staff of the Brazilian Air Force.
