= Subchefia de Inteligência do Estado-Maior de Defesa =

Department of the Brazilian military

The Subchefia de Inteligência do Estado-Maior de Defesa (2ª Sch/EMD or SC-2/EMD) is a department of the Brazilian defence staff in charge of signals intelligence. It is responsible for "combined operations" of military intelligence, involving cryptology, electronic warfare, telecommunications and remote sensing in support of activities carried out by the Brazilian military.
