= Infrastructure and economics =

Infrastructure (also known as "capital goods", or "fixed capital") is a platform for governance, commerce, and economic growth and is "a lifeline for modern societies". It is the hallmark of economic development.

It has been characterized as the mechanism that delivers the "..fundamental needs of society: food, water, energy, shelter, governance ... without infrastructure, societies disintegrate and people die." Adam Smith argued that fixed asset spending was the "third rationale for the state, behind the provision of defense and justice." Societies enjoy the use of "...highway, waterway, air, and rail systems that have allowed the unparalleled mobility of people and goods. Water-borne diseases are virtually nonexistent because of water and wastewater treatment, distribution, and collection systems. In addition, telecommunications and power systems have enabled our economic growth."

This development happened over a period of several centuries. It represents a number of successes and failures in the past that were termed public works and even before that internal improvements. In the 21st century, this type of development is termed infrastructure. Infrastructure can be described as tangible capital assets (income-earning assets), whether owned by private companies or the government.

== Ownership and financing of infrastructure ==
Infrastructure may be owned and managed by governments or by private companies, such as sole public utility or railway companies. Generally, most roads, major ports and airports, water distribution systems and sewage networks are publicly owned, whereas most energy and telecommunications networks are privately owned. Publicly owned infrastructure may be paid for from taxes, tolls, or metered user fees, whereas private infrastructure is generally paid for by metered user fees. Major investment projects are generally financed by the issuance of infrastructure bonds, specialized long-term bonds, which (often) offer interest and tax benefits.

Hence, government owned and operated infrastructure may be developed and operated in the private sector or in public-private partnerships, in addition to in the public sector. In the United States, public spending on infrastructure has varied between 2.3% and 3.6% of GDP since 1950. Many financial institutions invest in infrastructure.

=== Infrastructure debt ===
Infrastructure debt is a complex investment category reserved for institutional investors who can gauge jurisdiction-specific risk parameters, assess a project’s long-term viability, understand transaction risks, conduct due diligence, negotiate multi-creditor agreements, make timely decisions on consents and waivers, and analyze loan performance over time.

Research conducted by the World Pensions Council (WPC) suggests that most UK and European pensions wishing to gain a degree of exposure to infrastructure debt have done so indirectly, through investments made in infrastructure funds managed by specialised Canadian, US and Australian funds.

On November 29, 2011, the British government unveiled an unprecedented plan to encourage large-scale pension investments in new roads, hospitals, airports, etc. across the UK. The plan is aimed at enticing 20 billion pounds ($30.97 billion) of investment in domestic infrastructure projects.

=== Infrastructure as a new asset class for pension funds and SWFs ===
Pension and sovereign wealth funds are major direct investors in infrastructure. Most pension funds have long-dated liabilities, with matching long-term investments. These large institutional investors need to protect the long-term value of their investments from inflationary debasement of currency and market fluctuations, and provide recurrent cash flows to pay for retiree benefits in the short-medium term: from that perspective, think-tanks such as the World Pensions Council (WPC) have argued that infrastructure is an ideal asset class that provides tangible advantages such as long duration (facilitating cash flow matching with long-term liabilities), protection against inflation and statistical diversification (low correlation with ‘traditional’ listed assets such as equity and fixed income investments), thus reducing overall portfolio volatility. Furthermore, in order to facilitate the investment of institutional investors in developing countries' infrastructure markets, it is necessary to design risk-allocation mechanisms more carefully, given the higher risks of developing countries' markets.

=== Supranational and public co-investment with institutional asset owners ===
The notion of supranational and public co-investment in infrastructure projects jointly with private institutional asset owners has gained traction amongst IMF, World Bank and European Commission policy makers in recent years notably in the last months of 2014/early 2015: Annual Meetings of the International Monetary Fund and the World Bank Group (October 2014) and adoption of the €315 bn European Commission Investment Plan for Europe (December 2014).

=== Foreign ownership of 'public assets' ===
Some experts have warned against the risk of "infrastructure nationalism", insisting that steady investment flows from foreign pension and sovereign funds were key for the long-term success of the asset class- notably in large European jurisdictions such as France and the UK

=== Comparison of private versus public investment ===
An interesting comparison between privatisation versus government-sponsored public works involves high-speed rail (HSR) projects in East Asia. In 1998, the Taiwan government awarded the Taiwan High Speed Rail Corporation, a private organisation, to construct the 345 km line from Taipei to Kaohsiung in a 35-year concession contract. Conversely, in 2004 the South Korean government charged the Korean High Speed Rail Construction Authority, a public entity, to construct its high-speed rail line, 412 km from Seoul to Busan, in two phases. While different implementation strategies, Taiwan successfully delivered the HSR project in terms of project management (time, cost, and quality), whereas South Korea successfully delivered its HSR project in terms of product success (meeting owners' and users' needs, particularly in ridership). Additionally, South Korea successfully created a technology transfer of high-speed rail technology from French engineers, essentially creating an industry of HSR manufacturing capable of exporting knowledge, equipment, and parts worldwide.

== Planning and management of infrastructure ==
=== Infrastructure asset management ===
The method of infrastructure asset management is based upon the definition of a Standard of service (SoS) that describes how an asset will perform in objective and measurable terms. The SoS includes the definition of a minimum condition grade, which is established by considering the consequences of a failure of the infrastructure asset.

The key components of infrastructure asset management are:

- Definition of a standard of service
  - Establishment of measurable specifications of how the asset should perform
  - Establishment of a minimum condition grade
- Establishment of a whole-life cost approach to managing the asset
- Elaboration of an Asset Management Plan

After completing asset management, official conclusions are made. The American Society of Civil Engineers gave the United States a "D+" on its 2017 infrastructure report card.

=== Engineering ===
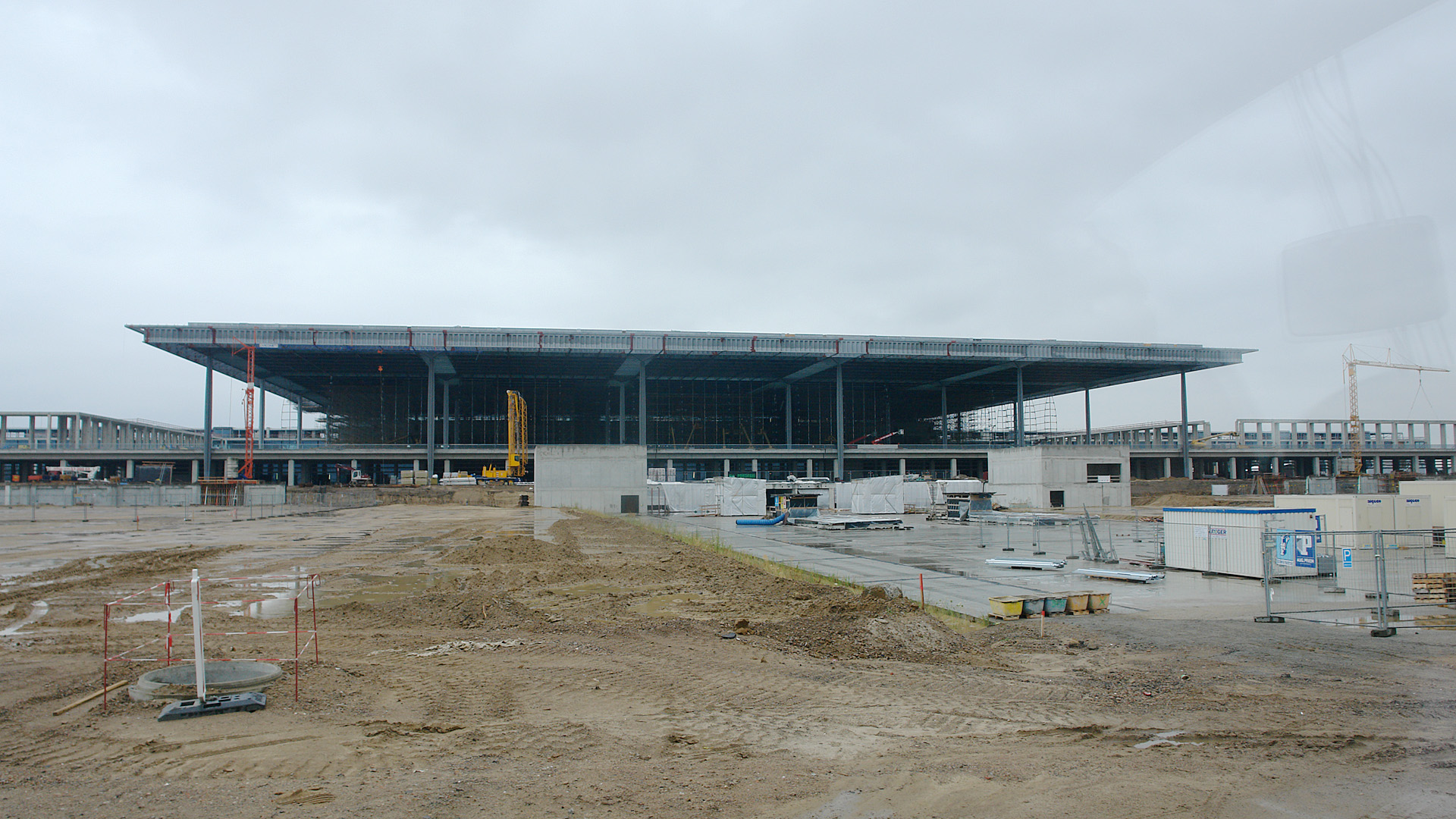
The Berlin Brandenburg Airport under construction

Most infrastructure is designed by civil engineers or architects. Generally road and rail transport networks, as well as water and waste management infrastructure are designed by civil engineers, electrical power and lighting networks are designed by power engineers and electrical engineers, and telecommunications, computing and monitoring networks are designed by systems engineers.

In the case of urban infrastructure, the general layout of roads, sidewalks and public places may sometimes be developed at a conceptual level by urban planners or architects, although the detailed design will still be performed by civil engineers. Depending upon the height of the building, it may be designed by an architect or for tall buildings, a structural engineer, and if an industrial or processing plant is required, the structures and foundation work will still be done by civil engineers, but the process equipment and piping may be designed by industrial engineer or a process engineer.

In terms of engineering tasks, the design and construction management process usually follows these steps:

Planning and Preliminary Engineering Studies

In general, infrastructure is planned by urban planners or civil engineers at a high level for transportation, water/waste water, electrical, urban zones, parks and other public and private systems. These plans typically analyze policy decisions and impacts of trade offs for alternatives. In addition, planners may lead or assist with environmental review that are commonly required to construct infrastructure. Colloquially this process is referred to as Infrastructure Planning. These activities are usually performed in preparation for preliminary engineering or conceptual design that is led by civil engineers or architects.

Preliminary studies may also be performed and may include steps such as:

- Determine existing and future traffic loads, determine existing capacity, and estimate the existing and future standards of service
- Conduct a preliminary survey and obtain information from existing air photos, maps, and plans
- Identify possible conflicts with other assets or topographical features
- Perform environmental impact studies:
  - Evaluate the impact on the human environment (noise pollution, odors, electromagnetic interference, etc.)
  - Evaluate the impact on the natural environment (disturbance of natural ecosystems)
  - Evaluate the possible presence of contaminated soils;
  - Given various time horizons, standards of service, environmental impacts, and conflicts with existing structures or terrain, propose various preliminary designs
  - Estimate the costs of the various designs, and make recommendations

Detailed Survey

- Perform a detailed survey of the construction site
- Obtain "as built" drawings of existing infrastructure
- Dig exploratory pits where required to survey underground infrastructure
- Perform a geotechnical survey to determine the bearing capacity of soils and rock
- Perform soil sampling and testing to estimate nature, degree and extent of soil contamination

Detailed Engineering

- Prepare detailed plans and technical specifications
- Prepare a detailed bill of materials
- Prepare a detailed cost estimate
- Establish a general work schedule

Authorisation

- Obtain authorisation from environmental and other regulatory agencies
- Obtain authorisation from any owners or operators of assets affected by the work
- Inform emergency services, and prepare contingency plans in case of emergencies

Tendering

- Prepare administrative clauses and other tendering documents
- Organise and announce a call for tenders
- Answer contractor questions and issue addenda during the tendering process
- Receive and analyse tenders, and make a recommendation to the owner

Construction Supervision

- Once the construction contract has been signed between the owner and the general contractor, all authorisations have been obtained, and all pre-construction submittals have been received from the general contractor, the construction supervisor issues an "Order to begin construction"
- Regularly schedule meetings and obtain contact information for the general contractor (GC) and all interested parties
- Obtain a detailed work schedule and list of subcontractors from the GC
- Obtain detailed traffic diversion and emergency plans from the GC
- Obtain proof of certification, insurance and bonds
- Examine shop drawings submitted by the GC
- Receive reports from the materials quality control lab
- When required, review Change requests from the GC, and issue construction directives and change orders
- Follow work progress and authorise partial payments
- When substantially completed, inspect the work and prepare a list of deficiencies
- Supervise testing and commissioning
- Verify that all operating and maintenance manuals, as well as warranties, are complete
- Prepare "as built" drawings
- Make a final inspection, issue a certificate of final completion, and authorise the final payment.

== Economic, social and environmental impacts of infrastructure ==
=== Impact on economic development ===
Investment in infrastructure is part of the capital accumulation required for economic development and may affect socioeconomic measures of welfare. The causality of infrastructure and economic growth has always been in debate. Generally, infrastructure plays a critical role in expanding national production capacity, which leads to increase in a country's wealth. In developing nations, expansions in electric grids, roadways, and railways show marked growth in economic development. However, the relationship does not remain in advanced nations who witness ever lower rates of return on such infrastructure investments.

Nevertheless, infrastructure yields indirect benefits through the supply chain, land values, small business growth, consumer sales, and social benefits of community development and access to opportunity. The American Society of Civil Engineers cite the many transformative projects that have shaped the growth of the United States including the Transcontinental Railroad that connected major cities from the Atlantic to Pacific coast; the Panama Canal that revolutionised shipment in connected the two oceans in the Western hemisphere; the Interstate Highway System that spawned the mobility of the masses; and still others that include the Hoover Dam, Trans-Alaskan pipeline, and many bridges (the Golden Gate, Brooklyn, and San Francisco–Oakland Bay Bridge). All these efforts are testimony to the infrastructure and economic development correlation.

European and Asian development economists have also argued that the existence of modern rail infrastructure is a significant indicator of a country’s economic advancement: this perspective is illustrated notably through the Basic Rail Transportation Infrastructure Index (known as BRTI Index)

=== Use as economic stimulus ===
During the Great Depression of the 1930s, many governments undertook public works projects in order to create jobs and stimulate the economy. The economist John Maynard Keynes provided a theoretical justification for this policy in The General Theory of Employment, Interest and Money, published in 1936. Following the Great Recession, some again proposed investing in infrastructure as a means of stimulating the economy (see the American Recovery and Reinvestment Act of 2009).

=== Environmental impacts ===
While infrastructure development may initially be damaging to the natural environment, justifying the need to assess environmental impacts, it may contribute in mitigating the "perfect storm" of environmental and energy sustainability, particularly in the role transportation plays in modern society. Offshore wind power in England and Denmark may cause issues to local ecosystems but are incubators to clean energy technology for the surrounding regions. Ethanol production may overuse available farmland in Brazil but have propelled the country to energy independence. High-speed rail may cause noise and wide swathes of rights-of-way through countrysides and urban communities but have helped China, Spain, France, Germany, Japan, and other nations deal with concurrent issues of economic competitiveness, climate change, energy use, and built environment sustainability.

== See also ==
- Infrastructure-based development
- Rural development
- Engineering economics (civil engineering)
- Asset Management Plan
- Infrastructure asset management
- Project finance
- Public capital
- Infrastructure debt
- American School (economics)
- Build–operate–transfer
- Public–private partnership
- Asset Management Plan
- Infrastructure asset management
- Natural monopoly
- Infrastructure bias

== Bibliography ==
- Koh, Jae Myong, Green Infrastructure Financing: Institutional Investors, PPPs and Bankable Projects, London: Palgrave Macmillan, 2018. ISBN 978-3-319-71769-2.
- Larry W. Beeferman, "Pension Fund Investment in Infrastructure: A Resource Paper", Capital Matter (Occasional Paper Series), No.3 December 2008
- A. Eberhard, "Infrastructure Regulation in Developing Countries", PPIAF Working Paper No. 4 (2007) World Bank
- M. Nicolas J. Firzli & Vincent Bazi, “Infrastructure Investments in an Age of Austerity : The Pension and Sovereign Funds Perspective”, published jointly in Revue Analyse Financière, Q4 2011 issue, pp. 34– 37 and USAK/JTW July 30, 2011 (online edition)
- Georg Inderst, "Pension Fund Investment in Infrastructure", OECD Working Papers on Insurance and Private Pensions, No. 32 (2009)
- Ascher, Kate; researched by Wendy Marech (2007). The works: anatomy of a city (Reprint. ed.). New York: Penguin Press. ISBN 978-0143112709.
- Hayes, Brian (2005). Infrastructure: the book of everything for the industrial landscape (1st ed.). New York City: Norton. ISBN 978-0393329599.
- Huler, Scott (2010). On the grid: a plot of land, an average neighborhood, and the systems that make our world work. Emmaus, Penn.: Rodale. ISBN 978-1-60529-647-0.
