= Institute of Asset Management =

U.K. based organization

- Abbreviation: IAM
- Formation: 2004
- Type: Professional association
- Purpose: Asset management
- Location: 29 Great George Street, Bristol, United Kingdom
- Coordinates: 51°27′11″N 2°36′17″W
- Region served: Worldwide
- Chief Executive: Kirsten Bodley
- Website: www.theiam.org

The Institute of Asset Management (IAM) is a UK-based not-for-profit professional body for those involved in asset management industry including acquisition, operation and care of physical assets, especially critical infrastructure. It was instrumental in the development of the international standard ISO 55000 for asset management.

== History ==
The IAM was incorporated on 26 February 2004. It led the production that year of the initial draft document PAS 55, its substantial revision to develop PAS 55:2008 (released in Dec 2008), and contributed to ISO Project Committee 251 between 2010 and 2013 before three international standards (55000/1/2) were launched in London on 5 February 2014. Babcock International and Scottish Water were the first two companies to be independently certified by BSI to the new asset management systems standard ISO 55001.

== Function ==
The IAM aims to advance the science and practice of asset management, by promoting and enabling the generation and application of knowledge, training and good practice, and help individuals become demonstrably competent. The Institute developed endorsement schemes for recommending competent assessors and training providers.

In 2012, the IAM launched the IAM Certificate and IAM Diploma international qualifications. The qualifications were updated in 2019 to meet UK qualifications standards and launched a digital certificate in partnership with Acclaim.

== Membership grades ==
Membership grade is dependent on the individual member's experience and / or formal qualification, whilst a Corporate Membership is also available.

- Registrant Member (Free)
- Associate Member
- Member (awarded the post-nominal letters MIAM)
- Fellow (awarded the post-nominal letters FIAM)
