= Natural Asset Company =

Company investing in ecological conservation

Natural Asset Companies, abbreviated as NACs, are designed to mobilize private investment for ecological conservation, nature-based solutions, and regenerative land management. Developed by the Intrinsic Exchange Group (IEG), NACs integrate the economic value of nature, including ecosystem services, into a corporation with an equity capital structure.

== Structure and Operations ==
Each NAC holds the rights to, and manages the productivity and ecological benefits of, natural assets such as forests, working ranches and farms, grasslands, or marine areas. NACs, which are managed by a board of directors and management team, are operated to maximize the ecological value of a designated area under management.

NACs assign value to ecosystem services, such as carbon retention, freshwater generation, groundwater storage, and erosion prevention. The quantity and quality of ecosystem services production, along with the underlying value of the natural assets, are measured and reported annually.

NACs integrate both traditional cash flows (e.g., from agriculture, carbon credits) and ecological performance value into their equity structure.

They produce two types of reports: traditional financial statements (GAAP/IFRS) and Ecological Performance Reports (EPRs) to account for non-traditional natural asset and ecosystem services value.

In May 2025, Fordham University’s Gabelli School of Business formed a partnership with IEG to establish a new, independent standards-setting body to develop, maintain, and oversee global accounting and reporting standards for natural capital. IEG licensed its Ecological Performance Reporting framework, used to value NACs, to Fordham. The accounting and reporting framework, which is based on the United Nations System of Environmental Economic Accounting - Ecosystem Accounting (SEEA EA), was developed for natural asset companies.

== Origins and development ==
The idea of adding natural capital to the balance sheet has been attempted before. For example, John Wamsley drove the listing of Earth Sanctuaries on the Australian Stock Exchange in 2000, forming a company that valued environment assets including their stock of endangered species. That venture was a commercial failure.

The modern concept of NACs was originated by Douglas Eger, who founded IEG in 2017 with support from investors, including the Rockefeller Foundation and the Inter-American Development Bank.

In 2021, IEG and ICE-owned New York Stock Exchange (NYSE) announced plans to introduce NACs as a publicly listed asset class designed to finance natural capital. The NYSE filed a listing proposal with the SEC, intending to allow NACs to be traded publicly, but withdrew the proposal in January 2024 amid political backlash and concerns about management of public lands in the U.S.

IEG continues to advance NACs in private markets and to assist landowners and companies in setting up natural asset company projects in regions including North America, South America, and the Caribbean.

In addition to private market trading, IEG is exploring public-exchange opportunities to list NACs in Europe, Asia, and the U.S.

== Objectives and value proposition ==
NACs address a significant funding gap in nature-based solutions, which is estimated to be $125 trillion annually, representing the value of ecosystem services that support half of global GDP.

NACs are designed to transform nature into an investible asset.

NACs incentivize landowners to engage in regenerative agriculture, conservation, and natural infrastructure projects by offering equity ownership and financial returns.

They aim to align ecological health with economic benefits for natural asset owners, investors, communities, and corporate stakeholders.

== Criticism ==
Criticism of this newly emerging form of asset has come from both the political left and right. From the right, critics argue NACs could be used to lock up public lands, enable land speculation, or result in unintended regulatory control over private land.

Opposition from the left reflects concerns that market-based solutions are not a responsible mode of stewardship for natural assets. Additional skepticism arises around the capacity of accounting frameworks to accurately value and report ecological performance.

== See also ==
- Asset management firm
- Capital management
- Industrial engineering
- Institutional investor
- ISO 55000
- List of asset management firms
- Maintenance engineering
- Mutual fund
- P2P asset management
- Real estate management
- Outline of management
