= Infrastructure debt =

Infrastructure debt is fixed income investments in infrastructure assets. It can be an attractive investment, especially those dealing with capital preservation.

Due to its possible complexity, this investment category is usually reserved for institutional investors, who are able to gauge jurisdiction-specific risk parameters, assess a project's long-term viability, understand business operational risks, conduct due diligence, negotiate (multi) creditors’ agreements, make timely decisions on consents and waivers, and analyze loan performance over time.

== Characteristics ==
Infrastructure debt, in comparison to infrastructure equity, has many distinct characteristics. Infrastructure debt is a short-term investment that has lower returns. It is much less risky and it does not generally benefit from the same inflation. This results from the majority of companies use floating rate debt or inflation linked-bonds. When dealing with floating rate debt, interest payments and bank bills move in unison. That is, a rise in inflation causes a rise in bank bill rates. Inflation-linked bonds occur when interest and principal payments are linked to CPI. Infrastructure debt has many defining characteristics that separate it from other infrastructure assets.

== Funds ==
Research conducted by Nicolas Firzli of the World Pensions council (WPc) suggests that most UK, European and Asian pension funds wishing to gain a degree of exposure to infrastructure debt have done so indirectly, through investments made in infrastructure funds managed by specialized UK, Canadian, US and Australian funds. Sequoia Investment Management Company, based in London, has launched Sequoia Economic Infrastructure Income Fund targeted at fund managers and institutional investors.

On 29 November 2011, the British government unveiled an unprecedented plan to encourage large-scale pension investments in new roads, hospitals, airports... etc. across the UK. The plan is aimed at enticing 20 billion pounds ($30.97 billion) of investment in domestic infrastructure projects "over the next decade", which could mark the beginning of a new wave of pension fund investment in infrastructure in the UK.

== Investment outcomes ==
Ratings agencies recognize the attractive credit characteristics of infrastructure debt including credit ratings less subject to fluctuations, lower defaults and higher recoveries than equivalently rated non-financial corporate debt.

The popularity of Infrastructure Debt relates to the key outcomes it provides for its investors. These outcomes include low historical losses, portfolio diversity, returns in excess of more liquid bonds and provides certainty of cash flow.

== See also ==
- Infrastructure bond
- Bankruptcy costs of debt
- Infrastructure and economics
