= Fixed assets management =

Accounting process

Fixed assets management is an accounting process that seeks to track fixed assets for the purposes of financial accounting, preventive maintenance, and theft deterrence.

Organizations face a significant challenge to track the location, quantity, condition, maintenance and depreciation status of their fixed assets. A popular approach to tracking fixed assets uses serial numbered asset tags, which are labels often with bar codes for easy and accurate reading. The owner of the assets can take inventory with a mobile bar code reader and then produce a report.

Off-the-shelf software packages for fixed asset management are marketed to businesses small and large. Some enterprise resource planning systems are available with fixed assets modules.

Some tracking methods automate the process, such as by using fixed scanners to read bar codes on railway freight cars or by attaching a radio-frequency identification (RFID) tag to an asset.

== Fixed asset tracking software ==
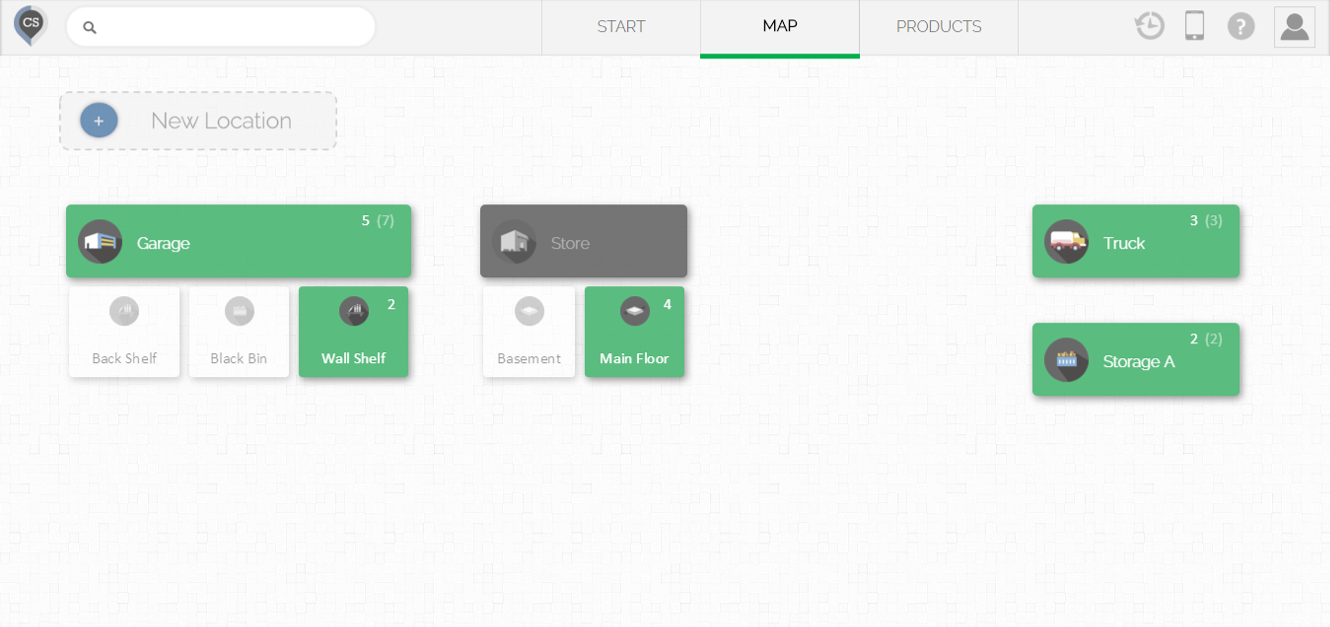
Fixed asset tracking across multiple locations

Tracking assets is an important concern of every company, regardless of size. Fixed assets are defined as any 'permanent' object that a business uses internally including but not limited to computers, tools, software, or office equipment. While employees may use a specific tool or tools, the asset ultimately belongs to the company and must be returned. And therefore without an accurate method of keeping track of these assets it would be very easy for a company to lose control of them.

Asset tracking software allows companies to track what assets it owns, where each is located, who has it, when it was checked out, when it is due for return, when it is scheduled for maintenance, and the cost and depreciation of each asset.

The reporting option that is built into most asset tracking solutions provides pre-built reports, including assets by category and department, check-in/check-out, net book value of assets, assets past due, audit history, and transactions.

All of this information is captured in one program and can be used on PCs as well as mobile devices. As a result, companies reduce expenses through loss prevention and improved equipment maintenance. They reduce new and unnecessary equipment purchases, and they can more accurately calculate taxes based on depreciation schedules.

The most commonly tracked assets are:

- Plant and equipment
- Buildings
- Fixtures and fittings
- Long term investment
- Machinery
- Vehicles and heavy equipments

Asset tracking software is often used to track both the information about an asset for financial reporting purposes as well as the physical location of an asset. The financial reporting elements of tracking often relate to accounting procedures and valuation needs but may or may not relate to location information.

Asset location tracking software often takes one of two approaches to monitoring asset locations. The first approach is to use a physical tracking device to provide data on physical location. This can take the form of a Bluetooth tracking beacon or a GPS tracking unit. The second approach is to track a location by the "responsible party". In this approach the software uses peer to peer assign and accept procedures to allow individuals to accept responsibility for assets. The asset location is then inferred based upon the person who has accepted responsibility.

== See also ==
- Asset
- Computerized maintenance management system
- Fixed asset register (FAR)
- Infrastructure asset management
- Radio-frequency identification (RFID tags are used for automatic asset management)
