= Devolvement =

Concept in investment banking

In the investment banking sector, particularly in India, devolvement is a process whereby if an investment issue is undersubscribed, an underwriter is required to subscribe to the remaining shares. The outstanding unsubscribed amount devolves onto the underwriter. This is also known as hard underwriting. The Securities and Exchange Board of India publishes guidelines and a recommended method of computation relating to the extent of the devolvement onto a particular underwriter in the case where there are multiple underwriters, or sub-underwriters.

== Regulatory framework in India ==
In India, devolvement arises within the broader underwriting framework regulated by the Securities and Exchange Board of India (SEBI). Under the SEBI (Underwriters) Regulations, 1993, an underwriter is a person who undertakes to subscribe to securities of a body corporate when the existing shareholders or the public do not subscribe to the securities offered to them.

SEBI’s investor guidance on the primary market also identifies underwriters as registered intermediaries involved in public issues and notes that offer documents disclose details of underwriting arrangements.

In practice, devolvement occurs when the level of subscription falls below the amount committed under the underwriting arrangement, requiring the underwriter to subscribe to the unsubscribed portion of the issue.
