= Terotechnology =

Engineering term

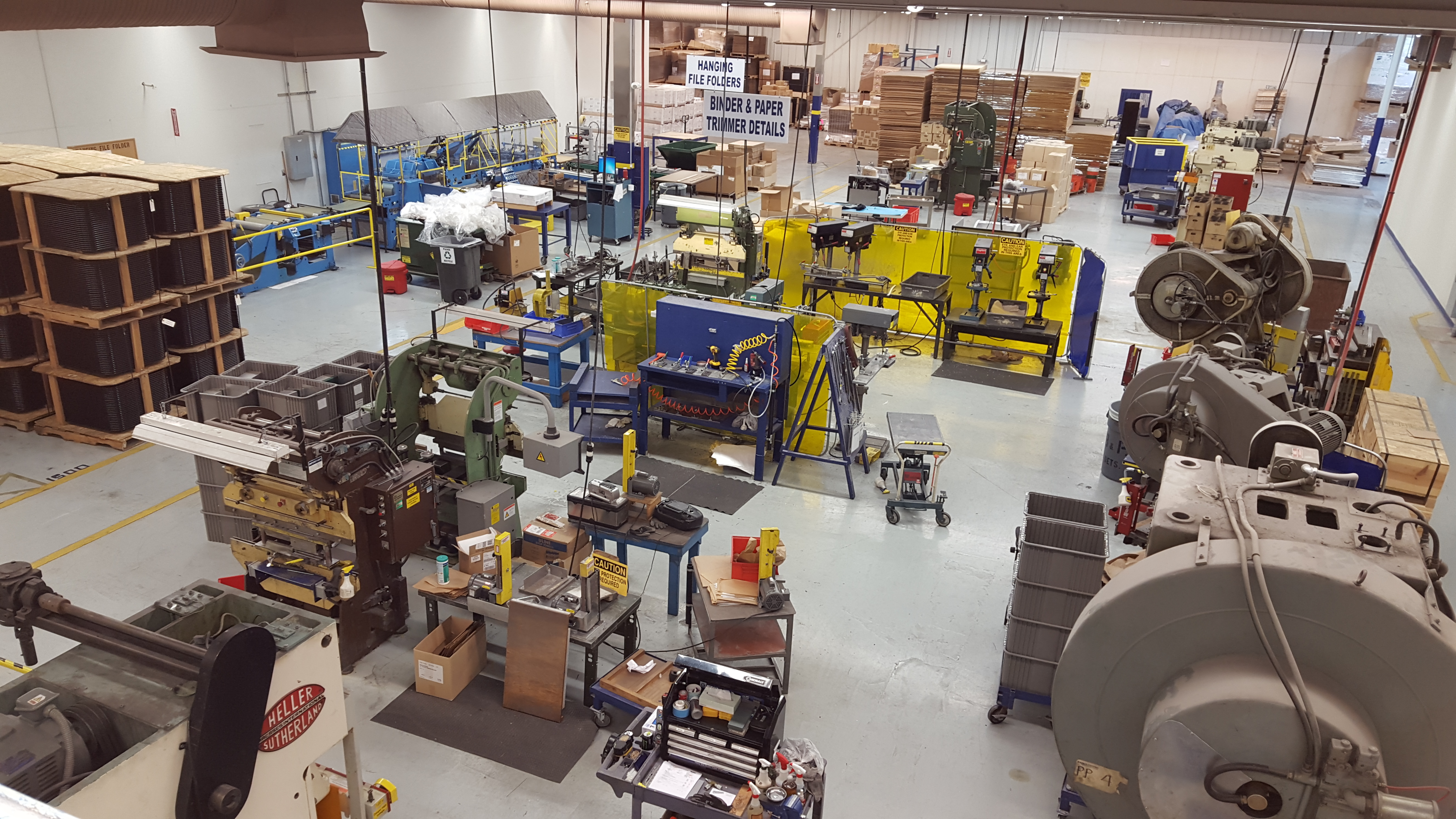
Machine Shop

Terotechnology (/ˌtɪəroʊtɛkˈnɒlədʒi ˌtɛr-/; from Greek τηρεῖν tērein "to care for" and technology) is the technology of installation, including the efficient use and management of equipment. It also involves the use of technology to carry out maintenance functions in a bid to reduce cost and increase productivity.

It has been replaced with "asset management".

== Definition ==
The term goes back to the 1970s. Terotechnology is a system for the care of equipment. It includes the management, engineering, and financial expertise working together to improve the installation and operations.

== In practice ==
It involves the reliability and maintainability of physical equipment regarding installation, operation, maintenance, or replacement. Decisions are influenced by feedback throughout the life cycle of a project. In 1992 the British Standards Institution published British Standard 3843: Guide to terotechnology. The standard was withdrawn in November 2011.

== See also ==
- Asset management
