= ISO/TC 251 =

ISO Technical Committee

ISO/TC251 is the ISO Technical Committee for Asset Management responsible for the development of the ISO 55000 family of standards. These standards define good practices in asset management and requirements for an asset management system. The standards apply to all types of assets and to all organizations. TC251 was created in March 2015 and currently (as of November 2019) includes members of 35 participating countries, plus 17 observer countries. The Technical Committee manages six workgroups:

- ISO/TC 251/WG3 – Communications: Manages the public communications plan for TC251 and the group's website.
- ISO/TC 251/WG4 – Product Improvement: Collects feedback from different stakeholders regarding the ISO 55000 series of standards. Manages the liaison of TC251 with other ISO and external workgroups that are active in the asset management space.
- ISO/TC 251/WG5 – Finance: Develops guidance specific to the financial aspects of asset management. WG5 published the new technical specification ISO/TS 55010 Guidance on alignment of asset management, finance and accounting in September 2019.
- ISO/TC 251/WG6 – Preparation for the next revision of ISO 55001, and manage the TC251 contribution to the revision of ISO's Annex SL.
- ISO/TC 251/WG7 – Development of the new standard ISO 55011 Guidance on the development of government asset management policy.
- ISO/TC 251/AHG1 – Spanish Translation Task Group.
