= Public capital =

Public capital is the aggregate body of government-owned assets that are used as a means for productivity. Such assets span a wide range including: large components such as highways, airports, roads, transit systems, and railways; local, municipal components such as public education, public hospitals, police and fire protection, prisons, and courts; and critical components including water and sewer systems, public electric and gas utilities, and telecommunications. Often, public capital is defined as government outlay, in terms of money, and as physical stock, in terms of infrastructure.

== Current state in the U.S. ==
In 1988, the U.S. infrastructure system including all public and private non-residential capital stock was valued at $7 trillion, an immense portfolio to operate and manage. And according to the Congressional Budget Office, in 2004 the U.S. invested $400 billion in infrastructure capital across federal, state, and local levels including the private sectors on transportation networks, schools, highways, water systems, energy, and telecommunications services. While public spending on infrastructure grew by 1.7% annually between 1956 and 2004, it has remained constant as a share of GDP since early 1980s. Despite the value and investment of public capital, growing delays in air and surface transportation, aging electric grid, an untapped renewable energy sector, and inadequate school facilities all have justified additional funding in public capital investment.

The American Society of Civil Engineers have continued to give low marks, averaging a D grade, for the nation's infrastructure since its inception of the Report Card in 1998. In 2009, each category of infrastructure varied from C+ to D− grades with an estimated $2.2 trillion of needed public capital investment. The aviation sector remains mired in continued delays in the reauthorization of federal programs and an outdated air traffic control system. One in four rural bridges and one in three urban bridges are structurally deficient. States are understaffed and underfunded to conduct safety inspections of dams. Texas alone has only seven engineers and an annual budget of $435,000 to oversee more than 7,400 dams. Electricity demand outpaces energy supply transmission and generation. Almost half of the water locks maintained by the U.S. Army Corps of Engineers are functionally obsolete. Drinking water faces an annual shortfall of $11 billion to manage their aging facilities and comply with federal regulations. Leaking pipes lose an estimated 7 billion US gallons (26,000,000 m^{3}) of clean drinking water a day. Under tight budgets, national, state, and local parks suffer neglect. Without adequate funding, rail cannot meet future freight tonnage load. Schools require a staggering $127 billion to bring facilities to decent operating condition. Billions of gallons of untreated sewage continue to be discharged into U.S.’s surface waters each year.

== Economic growth ==
One of the most classic macroeconomic inquiries is the effect of public capital investment on economic growth. While many analysts debate the magnitude, evidence has shown a statistically significant positive relationship between infrastructure investment and economic performance. U.S. Federal Reserve economist David Alan Aschauer asserted an increase of the public capital stock by 1% would result in an increase of the total factor productivity by 0.4%. Aschauer argues that the golden age of the 1950s and 1960s were partly due to the post-World War II substantial investment in core infrastructure (highways, mass transit, airports, water systems, electric/gas facilities). Conversely, the drop of U.S. productivity growth in the 1970s and 1980s was in response to the decrease of continual public capital investment and not the decline of technological innovation. Likewise, the European Union nations have declined public capital investment through the same years, also witnessing declining productivity growth rates. A similar situation emerges in developing nations. Analyzing OECD and non-OECD countries’ real-GDP growth rates from 1960 to 2000 with public capital as an explanatory variable (not using public investment rates), Arslanalp, Borhorst, Gupta, and Sze (2010) show that increases in the public capital stock does correlate with increases in growth. However, this relationship depends on initial levels of public capital and income levels for the country. Thus, OECD countries witness a stronger positive link in the short term while non-OECD countries experience a stronger positive link in the long term. Hence, developing countries can benefit from non-concessional foreign borrowing to finance high-prospect public capital investments.

Given this relationship of public capital and productivity, public capital becomes a third input in the standard, neoclassical production function:

$$\qquad\qquad Y_t = A_t * (N_t, K_t, G_t)$$

where:

Y_{t} represents real aggregate output of goods and services of the private sector
A_{t} represents productivity factor or Hicks-Neutral technical change
N_{t} represents aggregate employment of labor services
K_{t} represents aggregate stock of nonresidential capital
G_{t} represents flow of public capital stock (assuming services of public capital are proportional to public capital)

In this form, public capital has a direct influence on productivity as a third variable. Additionally, public capital has an indirect influence on multifactor productivity as it affects the other two inputs of labor and private capital. Despite this unique nature, public capital investment, used in the production process of nearly every sector, is not sufficient on its own to generate sustained economic growth. Thus, rather than the ends, public capital is the means. That is, instead of being seen as intermediate goods used as resources by businesses, public capital should be seen as goods which are used to make the final goods and services to consumers-taxpayers. Note that public capital levels should not be too high that it leads to financing costs and high tax rates issues which will negate the positive benefits of such investments. Moreover, infrastructure services carry the market-distorting features of pure, non-rival public goods; network externalities; natural monopolies; and the common resource problem such as congestion and overuse.

Empirical models that attempt to estimate the public investment and economic growth link involve a wide variety including: the Cobb-Douglas production function; a behavioral approach cost/profit function which includes public capital stock; Vector Auto Regression (VAR) models; and government investment growth regressions. These models nonetheless contend with reverse causality, heterogeneity, endogeneity, and nonlinearities in trying to capture the public capital and economic growth link. New Keynesian models, though, analyze the effect of government spending through the supply side rather than traditional Keynesian models that analyzes it through the demand side. Therefore, a temporary surge of infrastructure investment yields an expansion of output, and vice versa that dwindling infrastructure, like in the 1970s, hamper longer-term movement in productivity. Furthermore, new research on regional growth (as opposed to national growth with GDP) shows a strong positive relationship between public capital and productivity. Both fixed costs and transport costs lower with expanded infrastructure in localities and the resulting cluster of industries. As a result, economic activity grows along its pattern of trade. Therefore, the importance of regional clusters and metropolitan economies comes into effect.

== Social benefit ==
Beyond economic performance, public capital investment yields returns in quality of life indicators such as health, safety, recreation, aesthetics, and leisure time and activities. In example, highways provide better access and mobility for increased discretionary time and recreational outlets; mass transit can improve air quality with reduced number of private vehicles; improved municipal waste facilities reduces toxic groundwater contamination and better green space aesthetics such as parks; expanded water facilities aids in health and sanitation and environment such as reducing odor and sewer overflows. Furthermore, infrastructure adds to community ambience and quality of place with livelier downtowns, vibrant waterfronts, efficient land uses, compact spaces for commerce and recreation.

On the contrary, inadequate public capital impairs quality of life and social well-being. Over-capacity landfills lead to groundwater contamination, having deleterious effects on health. Deficient supply and quality of mass transit services impacts transit-dependents on their access to opportunity and resources. Increasing congestion in airports and roadways causes loss of discretionary time and recreational activities.

== Public capital initiatives ==
=== United States ===
Perhaps the largest contribution to the public works system in the U.S. came out of President Franklin D. Roosevelt’s New Deal initiatives particularly the creation of the Works Progress Administration (WPA) in 1935. At a time of a deep economic crisis, the WPA employed at its peak 3.35 million unemployed heads-of-households to work in rebuilding the country. The program helped construct millions of roads, bridges, parks, schools, hospitals, and levees while also providing educational programs, childcare, job training, and medical services. The overall public spending level for the program, unprecedented at the time, was $4.8 billion ($76 billion in 2008 dollars), and helped to stimulate the economy through public works projects.

Since then, the U.S. has contributed to other large infrastructure programs including the Interstate Highway System, 1956-1990, with a dedicated financing system through the gas tax and a matching contribution between federal government and states at 90% to 10%. Also, the Environmental Protection Agency's (EPA) Clean Water Act of 1972 provided a public capital investment of $40 billion in constructing and upgrading sewage treatment facilities with “significant positive impacts on the Nation’s water quality.” Considered by the National Academy of Engineering to be the greatest engineering achievement of the 20th century, the North American electric grid carries electricity over 300,000 miles (480,000 km) on high-voltage transmission lines across the U.S. Though currently facing aging facilities and equipment, this public capital investment has ubiquitously reached millions of homes and businesses.

Recently, the American Recovery and Reinvestment Act (ARRA) is another example of large public capital investment. Of the $311 billion in appropriations, about $120 billion are set aside for crucial investment in Infrastructure and Science and Energy. Some of ARRA's aims include smart grid technology, retrofitting of homes and federal buildings, automated aviation traffic control, advancing freight and passenger rail services, and upgrading water and waste facilities.

=== Other countries ===
Worldwide, transformative public capital investments are taking place. China’s ambitious rapid high-speed rail program is estimated to extend 18,000 km by 2020. By the end of 2008, the country had a fleet of over 24,000 locomotives, the most lines in the world, the fastest express train in service, and longest high-speed track in the world. UK, Denmark, and other countries in northern Europe that surround the Baltic Sea and North Sea, continue to develop their rapid expansion of off-shore wind farms. With continued expansion of terminals and connection to nation's comprehensive transport system, the Hong Kong International Airport is one of the largest engineering and architectural projects in the world. In the last decade, Chile installed five combined cycle gas-turbined (CCGT) power plants to meet its nation's growing energy needs.

== See also ==
- Infrastructure
- Natural resource
- Sustainable development
- Sustainability
