= Infrastructure bond =

Infrastructure bond is a type of bond issued either by private corporations or by state-owned enterprises to finance the construction of infrastructure facilities such as highways, ports, railways, airport terminals, bridges, tunnels, pipelines, etc. These bonds may be nominated both in local and in more stable foreign currencies, such as U.S. dollars or euros. Infrastructure bonds are popular in developing economies where there is a strong demand for infrastructure.

== Operation ==
The bond issuer receives a concession for an infrastructure facility for some time (often several decades after completion) and collects payments from facility users (for example, a toll road). Quite often, the state (or several states), on the territory of which this object is being built, provides guarantees for the issued bonds, which makes them attractive to a larger number of market participants, as doing so reduces the risk. Due to the long payback period of infrastructure facilities, the bond circulation period is also quite long (often several decades); therefore, such bonds will mostly target institutional investors including insurance companies and pension funds. To make such bond even more attractive, the state authorities may arrange certain interest and tax benefits.

== See also ==
- Build–operate–transfer
- Infrastructure-based development
- Infrastructure and economics
- Public–private partnership
