= Asset Management Plan =

Business plan to manage infrastructure

An asset management plan (AMP) is a tactical plan for managing an organisation's infrastructure and other assets to deliver an agreed standard of service. Typically, an asset management plan will cover more than a single asset, taking a systems approach - especially where a number of assets are co-dependent and are required to work together to deliver an agreed standard of service.

The International Infrastructure Management Manual defines an asset management plan as; "a plan developed for the management of one or more infrastructure assets that combines multi-disciplinary management techniques (including technical and financial) over the life cycle of the asset in the most cost effective manner to provide a specific level of service."

== Objectives ==
Twofold: justification and optimization

- Justification - to give visibility of the costs and benefits associated with providing the agreed standard of service.
- Optimisation - to minimize the whole-life cost, including the operation, maintenance and replacement or disposal of each asset in the system.

Clearly for either of the above to work, the Standard of Service needs to be defined (in a measurable way) for each asset in an asset system.

The first part can be achieved relatively quickly, and is necessary before the decentralization of decision-making around maintenance and replacement can really occur, but the second requires ongoing work in local teams, together with better guidance from the center.

An asset management plan should take a "horses for courses" approach - not a one size fits all, but needs based - taking into account the basic information required. Beyond this, it should be built upon by the local asset manager according to local needs. A fully developed Asset Management approach usually requires a number of iterations of the AMP, and needs to be reviewed more frequently for more complex systems, especially asset systems where the average annual cost required to provide the agreed standard of service is high.

== Typical contents ==
An AMP typically covers the following areas:

1. Asset System Description
2. Standard of Service Definition
3. Current Asset Performance
4. Planned Actions
5. Costs
6. Benefits
7. Potential Improvements

=== Asset system description ===
Description of the problem that the asset system aims to reduce. What assets are currently employed to address the problem? Essentially, why do these assets exist? What would occur if these assets didn't exist. Identify dependencies between different parts of the asset system. This is important to understand why the assets are there in the first place.

=== Standard of service definition ===
How should the above assets be performing and to what condition? Define the Standard of Service (SoS) for the various parts of the asset system or group (a simple performance specification). Describe how the system, as a whole, is intended to perform in a measurable way. Usually consists of two parts, a measurable performance specification, and a minimum condition grade (CG).

The minimum CG should take account of the potential consequences of failure i.e. a flood defence protecting an urban area that would flood to a depth of 1m should the wall fail under design conditions should have a higher minimum CG (2 or 3). An earth embankment that is only protecting agricultural land, where the consequences of failure are significantly less will likely have a lower minimum CG (4 or 5).

If further refinement is necessary, the minimum condition grade should also take into account the likely failure mechanism - if failure of an asset is likely to occur very slowly and can be monitored, then a minimum condition of 2 or 3 is unlikely to be required - a minimum of CG4 can probably be justified. Conversely an asset that is liable to a fast failure mode with little warning will likely require a higher minimum condition.

Example Standards of Service for Flood Risk Management Assets:

A. Walls: 5.2m high until chainage 540m where the height drops to 5.1m. The condition of the walls will be maintained to CG3 or better (due to urban area).

B. Culverts: under 3 carriageways, total of 120 m length (40 m each) provide conveyance for 30 m^{3}/s without surcharging. The condition of the culverts will be maintained to CG4 or better (under a rural road with alternative routings).

C. Pump station: provides capacity of 12 m^{3}/s to drain the catchment during periods of tide-lock (usually every high-tide, for a period of 4 hours.) The condition of the pump station will be maintained to CG2 or better (no redundancy).

D. Weir: provides a minimum water-level of 3.6 m to the watercourse above. The condition of the weir will be maintained to CG5 or better (minimal consequences of failure).

For some assets, there may be a legal obligation to maintain and operate the asset to a certain SoS.

Therefore, it is important to understand what function the assets were designed to perform, and what minimum condition is considered acceptable.

=== Current asset performance ===
What condition are the assets currently in? List/inventory and condition of all "assets" within the system, with their unique identifiers. This could include information such as asset owner, age, estimate of remaining life etc. This is important to understand what state the assets are currently in.

=== Planned actions and lifecycle management ===
A short narrative explaining the near-term actions required to bridge the gap between where we are, and where we want to be. In the case where we are already at or above the agreed SoS, this section explains how we will continue to do so for the least cost - enabling an innovative approach to providing the agreed SoS.

This is important to understand what actions are planned to bring or keep the assets above their minimum condition, and able to perform their intended function.

==== Replacement policy ====
As a form of preventive maintenance, a replacement policy tells when to replace the asset. An age replacement policy (ARP) calls for replacement of an asset at a particular age. For assets with patterns of intermittent use, a modified age replacement policy (MARP) replaces the asset close to the replacement age, but without disrupting use of the asset.

=== Costs ===
A forward looking cost-profile for operating, maintaining, refurbishing and replacing to sustain the Standard of Service. Ideally the cost-profile will extend to cover the life of the longest-lived asset in the system, so as to estimate the whole-life cost, and make it possible to determine the average annual costs.

This section may need to be revisited and updated annually, and may form the basis for an annual bid for funding.

The numbers provided for the in-year (year 0) and the next three years (1 - 3), should be fairly accurate. Beyond that, estimates of costs so as to enable planning for any large expenditure items expected in the medium-term and to allow sufficient time to do a more in depth appraisal for an asset system that may require a change to the Standard of Service. Alternative management regimes should be considered to optimise the cost of providing the SoS. Where assumptions have been made, the basis for these should be provided.

This is important to understand what the planned actions are going to cost, as well as the ongoing "management" and overheads directly related to this particular asset system. Also essential from a local perspective, is optimizing the approach to providing the SoS.

=== Benefits ===
Why do we want to sustain the agreed standard of service of the assets in this asset system? Without exception, assets should provide some measure of benefits that can be measured or explained. This will usually involve the translation of the standard of service into a monetary figure. Other benefits may be social or environmental, which may be difficult to quantify in monetary or quantitative terms, but some attempt to record all the relevant benefits is important, and more qualitative means may be employed.

=== Improvements ===
Potential improvements to the Standard of Service: The standard of service currently delivered may be improved by acquisition, enhancement or other means. An "improvement" may also include the potential to reduce the standard of service, and potentially even dispose or divest of an asset or assets in an asset system.

These improvements represent a potential change to the standard of service and is typically managed as a project, complete with some form of appraisal of the additional expenditure, comparing different options and selecting a preferred option based on whatever decision process is appropriate.

The development and justification of a change project is outside the scope of an asset management plan.

=== Alternate contents ===
The Queensland Department of Local Government, Sport & Recreation circulated a letter to Queensland Councils in December 2008 which specified the minimum requirements for asset management plans in Queensland. These requirements include:

- Introduction and Overview
- Service Levels (derived from Service Planning)
- Future Demand (derived from Corporate Planning and Service Planning)
- Lifecycle Management and Financial Considerations
- Asset Management Practices
- Improvement and Monitoring

== Legislation ==
Section 104(6) of the Queensland Local Government Bill 2008 defines a "long-term asset management plan" as a document that -

- outlines the local government's goals, strategies and policies for managing the local government's assets and infrastructure, during the period covered by the plan; and
- covers a period of at least 10 years after the commencement of the plan.

It states that a local government must annually conduct, and report on the results of, a review of the implementation of the plan.

In Canada, since 2015 the government of Ontario has mandated municipalities to develop asset management plans for their infrastructure.

== See also ==
- Cost–benefit analysis
- Cost-effectiveness Analysis
- Infrastructure
- Infrastructure asset management
- Asset management plan period
