= Agile infrastructure =

Agile IT infrastructure, or Agile Infrastructure for short, is an emerging type of IT infrastructure that goes beyond Hyper-converged infrastructure and puts emphasis on:

- speed of implementing change;
- reducing complexity;
- resilience;
- quick adaptation to new technologies;
- taking advantage of lightweight deployment options;
- easy accessibility of management tools; and
- making everyone heroes, not just a few individuals.
