= ISO 55000 =

Asset management standards document

ISO 55000 is an international standard covering management of assets of any kind. Before it, a Publicly Available Specification (PAS 55) was published by the British Standards Institution in 2004 for physical assets. The ISO 55000 series of Asset Management standards was launched in January 2014.

== History ==
PAS 55 was originally produced in 2004 by a number of organisations under the leadership of the Institute of Asset Management. It then underwent a substantial revision with 50 participating organisations from 15 industry sectors in 10 countries. PAS 55:2008 (available in both English and Spanish versions) was released in December 2008 along with a toolkit for self-assessment against the specification.

The PAS gave guidance and a 28-point requirements checklist of good practices in physical asset management; typically this was relevant to gas, electricity and water utilities, road, air and rail transport systems, public facilities, process, manufacturing, and natural resource industries. It was equally applicable to public and private sector, regulated or non-regulated environments.

The standard was split into two parts:

- Part 1 - Specification for the optimised management of physical infrastructure assets
- Part 2 - Guidelines for the application of PAS 55-1

It was also accompanied by a comprehensive Competencies Framework for asset managers.

The ISO 55000 Series

Established in August 2010, ISO Project Committee 251 held its first plenary meeting in Melbourne, Australia in early 2011; its final meeting was in Calgary in early 2013. After almost four years of development, three international standards (55000/1/2) were launched in London on 5 February 2014:

- ISO 55000:2014: Asset management – Overview, principles and terminology
- ISO 55001:2014: Asset management – Management Systems – Requirements
- ISO 55002:2018: Guidelines for the application of ISO 55001 (see below for 2018 update)

These standards are available in English, French, Spanish, Russian, Chinese, Japanese, Dutch, Swedish, Danish, Portuguese (Brazil) and Portuguese (Portugal), Farsi, Serbian, and Finnish. In 2015 the ISO Technical Committee 251 was created to continue work on Asset Management standards and evolving the three existing standards. In 2016 the formal revision process of ISO 55002 was launched. In 2017 two new projects were launched:

- ISO/TS 55010: Guidance on alignment of asset management, finance and accounting (published in September 2019, see below)
- ISO 55011: Guidance on the development of government asset management policy (targeted for 2021)

ISO 55002:2018

In November 2018 a revised and expanded version ISO 55002:2018 was released. General improvements include expanded detailed guidance for every clause of the 55001 requirements document, and clarification of the contribution of each requirement to the four ’fundamentals’ of asset management: Value, Alignment, Leadership, and Assurance. It also describes how to apply the requirements of ISO 55001 to the key domains of asset management:

- The concept of "value" in asset management
- The scope of the Asset Management System
- The Strategic Asset Management Plan
- Asset management decision-making
- Risk management in the context of asset management
- Finance in asset management
- Scalability of ISO 55001 to organizations of all sizes

ISO/TS 55010:2019

In September 2019 ISO/TS 55010:2019 was released. This Technical Specification is a guideline enabling organizations to better understand why and how alignment between financial and non-financial functions is important in realizing value from assets.

Endorsed Assessors

The Institute of Asset Management developed endorsement schemes for recommending competent assessors and training providers. The World Partners in Asset Management have developed a Certified Asset Management Assessor (CAMA) certification scheme based on the Global Forum on Maintenance and Asset Management's Competency Specification for an ISO 55001 Asset Management System Auditor/Assessor.

== See also ==
- International Standards Organization
- List of ISO standards
- ISO TC 251
