= Infrastructure asset management =

Maintenance of public infrastructure assets

Infrastructure asset management is the integrated, multidisciplinary set of strategies in sustaining public infrastructure assets such as water treatment facilities, sewer lines, roads, utility grids, bridges, and railways. Generally, the process focuses on the later stages of a facility's life cycle, specifically maintenance, rehabilitation, and replacement. Asset management specifically uses software tools to organize and implement these strategies with the fundamental goal to preserve and extend the service life of long-term infrastructure assets which are vital underlying components in maintaining the quality of life in society and efficiency in the economy. In the 21st century, climate change adaptation has become an important part of infrastructure asset management competence.

== Term ==
Infrastructure asset management is a specific term of asset management focusing on physical, rather than financial assets. Sometimes the term infrastructure management is used to mean the same thing, most notably in the title of The International Infrastructure Management Manual (2000, 6th edition). Where there is no problem of confusion, the term asset management is more widely used, as in the professional societies: the Asset Management Council in Australia and the Institute of Asset Management in the UK. In this context, infrastructure is a wide term denoting road and rail, water, power, etc. assets. Road asset management is part of infrastructure asset management including all the physical assets on the road network such as roads, bridges, culverts, and road furniture.

The first published use of the term asset management to refer to physical assets is not known for sure. The earliest adopter known for certain is Dr Penny Burns in 1984 (see the Asset Management History Project AMQI's STRATEGIC ASSET MANAGEMENT – Public infrastructure). The National Asset Management Manual was published in Australia in October 1994 by the Institute of Municipal Engineering Australia (now IPWEA). The NAMM and the New Zealand Infrastructure Asset Management Manual published in 1996 are an early use of the specific term infrastructure asset management Home - NAMS NZ. The NAMM and IAMM were combined into the International Infrastructure Management Manual (IIMM) published in 2000. The term "asset management" was first used in a document published in 1983 by the United States Department of Transportation, Federal Highway Administration entitled: Transportation Resource Management Strategies for Elected Officials of Rural Municipalities and Counties. That document consisted of seven chapters of resource management strategies for each of two types of transportation infrastructure - roads & bridges and public transportation. Each of these two parts of the document focused on the following seven categories: Planning, Prioritization, Contracting Out, Innovative Finance, Human Resource Management, Asset Management and Performance Measurement & Reporting.

== Current situation ==
=== Australia ===
Most local governments in Australia are required to develop an asset management plan for major asset classes and align the forecast outlays with a long tern financial plan to ensure the needed services from infrastructure are provided in an affordable and sustainable manner. Guidelines for alignment financial and non-financial aspects of asset management are available in the Australian Infrastructure Financial Management Manual published in 2009 and updated in 2015 and International Infrastructure Financial Management Manual, 2020.

=== United States ===
After decades of inadequate capital investment in United States's infrastructure such as the Interstate Highway System, local water treatment facilities, electric transmission and utility lines, the need to sustain such infrastructure experiences mounting challenges. The current duress includes tight state and local budgets, deferral of needed maintenance funding, and political pressures to cut public spending. Today, shrinking federal appropriations, progressively aging capital stock, and parochial statuses and interest groups have inhibited flexible procurement strategies. And with the rise of design firms, professional societies, licensures, construction and industry associations, and related specialties the management of the infrastructure system has dramatically altered. As a result, the life cycle of a facility, including planning, design, construction, operations, maintenance, upgrading, and replacement has become bifurcated between agencies and firms where design and construction becomes contracted separately from operations and maintenance. The push for more dual-track strategies and not segmented ones such as Design-Build and Build-Operate-Transfer helps in maintaining public facilities. Yet, over time, the government apparatus focused more on start-up capital expenses for constructing public assets without focused monies on maintenance.

After World War II, with the policies of the Roosevelt Administration, economic boom of the 1950s, and rise in Federalism, public projects became financed through direct government funding. Additionally, the federal government began setting criteria and procedures for architects and engineers to comply on federal construction and related projects. State and local statutes soon followed suit. Over the years, a large bureaucratic machine began administering infrastructure projects through Design-Bid-Build and debt financing methods. This led to hyper-competition of federal, states, and localities over scant federal resources and overall fostered a limited approach in life-cycle attention (namely, no account of operation and maintenance). Asset management attempts to fill in the gaps of such fragmentation for better performance in infrastructure assets.

=== Canada ===
In Canada, the majority of municipal assets were built between 1960s to 1970s. The average age of municipal infrastructure has increased since the end of the late 1970s, because investment has been insufficient to replace deteriorating assets. This deficit could be the result a shift in financing policy at the end of 1970s, which made the local governments responsible to fund the municipal assets. Recently, in Ontario municipalities are required to develop an asset management plan to receive provincial fund.

== Processes and activities ==
The basic premise of infrastructure asset management is to intervene at strategic points in an asset's normal life cycle to extend the expected service life, and thereby maintain its performance. Typically, a long-life-cycle asset requires multiple intervention points including a combination of repair and maintenance activities and even overall rehabilitation. Costs decrease with planned maintenance rather than unplanned maintenance. Yet, excessive planned maintenance increases costs. Thus, a balance between the two must be recognized. While each improvement raises an asset's condition curve, each rehabilitation resets an asset's condition curve, and complete replacement returns condition curve to new level or upgraded level. Therefore, strategically timing these interventions will aid in extending an asset's life cycle. A simple working definition of asset management would be: first, assess what you have; then, assess what condition it is in; and lastly, assess the financial burden to maintain it at a targeted condition.

Essential processes and activities for infrastructure asset management include the following:

- Maintaining a systematic record of individual assets (an inventory)—e.g., acquisition cost, original service life, remaining useful life, physical condition, repair and maintenance consistency
- Developing a defined program for sustaining the aggregate body of assets through deterioration modeling, planned maintenance, repair, and replacement
- Implementing and managing information systems in support of these systems—e.g., Geographic Information Systems
- Defining current and expected levels of service and linking them to maintenance and capital planning
- Calculating life-cycle cost of assets and possible sources of finance for maintenance actions

Infrastructure asset management may include specialized maintenance techniques aimed at preserving the operational integrity of critical systems such as pipelines, industrial facilities, and drainage networks. These techniques use advanced cleaning and inspection technologies. They are designed to remove contaminants, prevent blockages, and maintain asset performance over the long term. In particular, high-pressure water jetting is a powerful and effective cleaning method capable of restoring surfaces to their original condition and clearing blockages, such as chemical and concrete residues, in drains, sewers, or other pipes.

These processes and activities are interrelated and interdependent aspects that usually cross organizational boundaries including finance, engineering, and operations. Hence, asset management is a comprehensive approach in handling an immense portfolio of public and private capital stock. As example, in 2009, the IBM Maximo software was adopted to manage the maintenance of rolling stock and facilities for three railway systems: the Long Island Rail Road, San Francisco BART system, Washington metrorail. Also, recently, wireless sensors, totaling 663, have been installed on South Korea's Jindo Bridge to detect structural cracks and corrosion. Though in a testing phase among three universities in South Korea, United States, and Japan, the use of wireless technology to may lend itself to future, cost-efficient asset management.

In 2014 ISO published an international management system standard for asset management. The ISO 55000 series provides terminology, requirements and guidance for implementing, maintaining and improving an effective asset management system.

== Work practices ==
Politically, many legal and governmental initiatives have emphasized proactive asset management given the current state of an aging infrastructure and fiscal challenges. Recent developments include the Governmental Accounting Standards Board Statement No. 34 that required state and local entities to report in their accounting all infrastructure assets not only the privately financed ones such as water supply and utilities paid by user fees. This helps to determine an agency's overall infrastructure asset inventory, timely assessment of physical condition, and annual projection of financial requirements. Additionally, the United States Environmental Protection Agency’s Capacity, Management, Operation, and Maintenance (CMOM) initiative works to move away from the compliance-mandate enforcement to proactive partnership with public managers to self-audit their infrastructure systems in assessing capacity, management, and operations/maintenance.

Still other proponents for proactive management include judicial consent decrees for facility managers to resolve noncompliance with environmental standards set by EPA or state environmental protection departments (i.e., laws against sewer overflows); post-9/11 security vulnerability analyses; funding legislation that specifies asset management as qualifying condition to receive/keep award; and professional organizations that are moving the industry to asset management through education, research, and workshops.

Despite the current challenges of the time's financial constraints, one advantage is the growing availability of methodology and technology to employ asset management. But while municipalities have made significant investments and use of software tools in the last 20 years, they are mostly stand-alone systems with limited to no capability for sharing or exchanging information with other tools. Consequently, they operate in isolated silos of information across municipal departments. Data has to be re-interpreted, transformed, and reentered into different software tools several times leading to time-consuming, prone-to-error inefficiencies. Many in academia and industry recognize the need for integrated, multidisciplinary asset management that involves:

- Systemization and coordination of work processes
- Development of centralized share data repositories
- Organization of distributed software tools into modular, extensive-wide software environments

== United Nations Infrastructure Asset Management approach ==
The United Nations Department of Economic and Social Affairs (UN DESA), United Nations Capital Development Fund (UNCDF), and United Nations Office for Project Services (UNOPS) are currently working together to encourage governments world-wide to adopt a more systemic and proactive approach in the management of their infrastructure assets. Highlighting that more than 90 per cent of the Sustainable Development Goals and their targets hinge upon sound infrastructure asset management, their initiatives seek, among other things, to ensure the accessibility, resilience and sustainability of infrastructure assets, to strengthen public management confidence among the population and to attract new investments.

To meet these challenges, the UN published Managing Infrastructure Assets for Sustainable Development: A handbook for local and national governments. The Handbook offers a flexible step-by-step diagnostic methodology with advice, exercises and examples easily accessible to practitioners and decision-makers in local and central governments. Focused on anticipating risks and facing the challenges of the future, the guide applies to traditional infrastructure (roads, water distribution networks, sanitation, buildings for essential services, etc.), publicly owned land and to equipment operation and maintenance. Some chapters also offer a situational assessment of climate risks and resource mobilization for a more effective response to public health emergencies.

The UN also created a Massive Open Online Course (MOOC) on Infrastructure Asset Management for Sustainable Development, which provides in-depth instruction and complements knowledge acquired from the Handbook. This course is freely accessible.

== IIAM approach ==
The Institute of Infrastructure Asset Management (IIAM), a U.S.-based transportation consultancy, works to promote the same issues and collaborates with other organizations, such as in the INFRAASSETS2010 conference in Malaysia, in management of public assets.

The IIAM approach to infrastructure asset management is based upon the definition of a Standard of Service (SoS) that describes how an asset will perform in objective and measurable terms. The SoS includes the definition of a "minimum condition grade", which is established by considering the consequences of a failure of the infrastructure asset.

The key components of "Infrastructure Asset Management" are:

- Definition of a Standard of Service
  - Establishment of measurable specifications of how the asset should perform
  - Establishment of a minimum condition grade
- Establishment of a whole-life cost approach to managing the asset
- Elaboration of an Asset Management Plan

== GIS system ==
Public asset management expands the definition of Enterprise Asset Management (EAM) by incorporating the management of all things which are of value to a municipal jurisdiction and its citizen's expectations. Public Asset Management is the term that considers the importance that public assets affect other public assets and work activities which are important sources of revenue for municipal governments and has various points of citizen interaction. The versatility and functionality of a GIS system allow for the control and management of all assets and land-focused activities. All public assets are interconnected and share proximity, and this connectivity is possible through the use of GIS. GIS-centric public asset management standardizes data and allows interoperability, providing users the capability to reuse, coordinate, and share information in an efficient and effective manner.

Among the GISs in use for infrastructure management in the USA are GE Smallworld and ESRI. An ESRI GIS platform combined with the overall public asset management umbrella of both physical hard assets and soft assets helps remove the traditional silos of structured municipal functions which serves the citizens. While the hard assets are the typical physical assets or infrastructure assets, the soft assets of a municipality includes permits, license, code enforcement, right-of-ways and other land-focused work activities.

== Capacity building ==
An executive education program in infrastructure asset management (Certificate of Advanced Studies Managing Infrastructure Assets, CASMIA, 16ECTS) has been developed since 2012, launched in 2014 and funded by Swiss federal Agency of Energy (SFOE). It is the only individual and organizational learning program worldwide that operates by changing university institute hosts. This ensures that the emerging MIA profession can cope with cross-disciplinary content critically and universities review curriculum. Former university institutes include ETH Zurich (IBI) and University of St. Gallen (HSG-ACA). This program also ensures the highest possible accreditation for an emerging profession, since individuals in this field still outperform institutions in terms of quality of content.

== See also ==
- Design-Build
- Enterprise Asset Management
- Life cycle assessment
- ISO 55000
- Public good
