= TAM Airlines Flight 3054 =

2007 aviation accident in Brazil

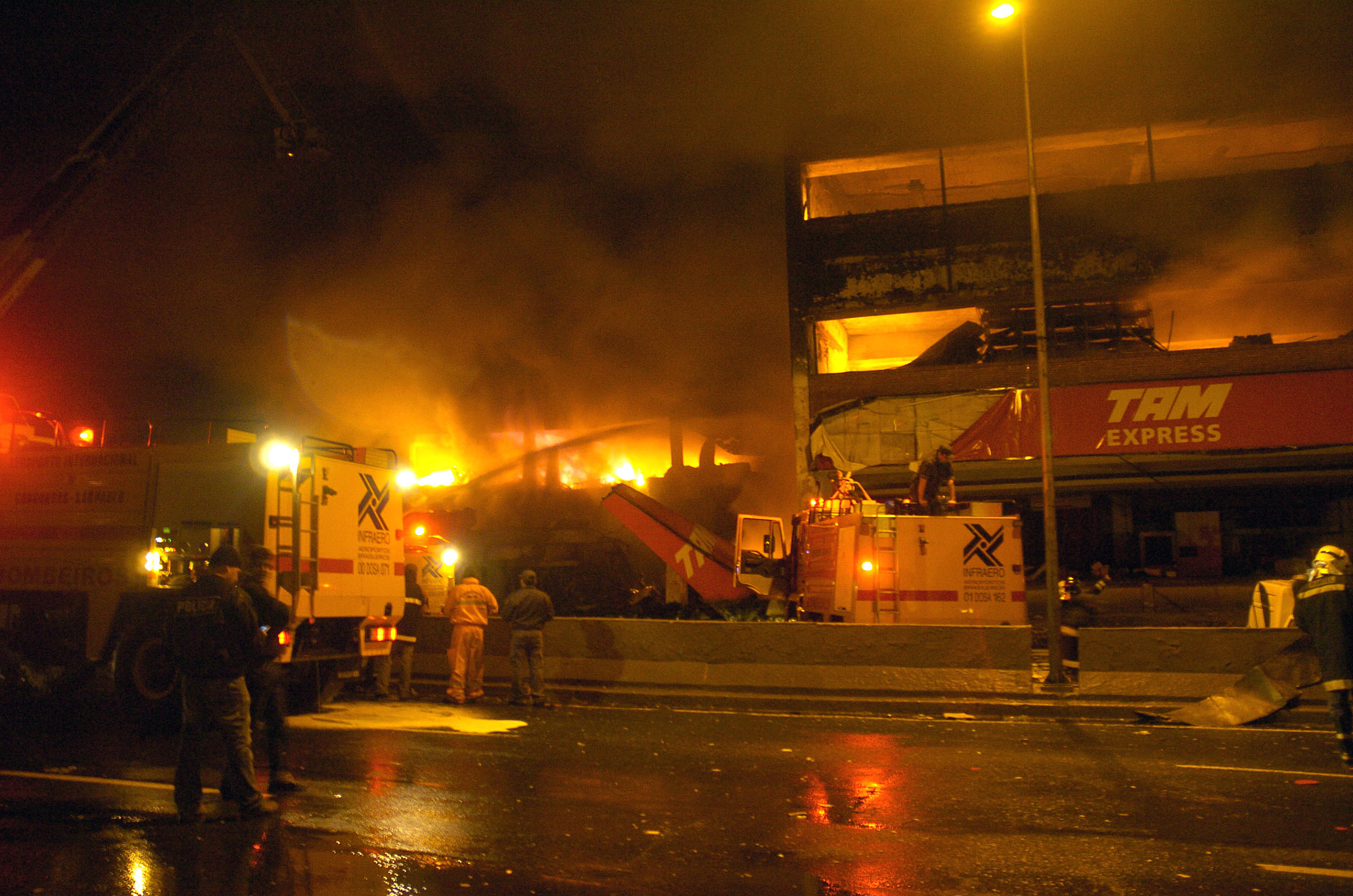
- The TAM Express warehouse on fire, shortly after the aircraft crashed into it

Accident
- Date: 17 July 2007
- Summary: Crashed after runway overrun due to pilot error in inclement weather
- Site: São Paulo–Congonhas Airport, São Paulo, Brazil; 23°37′11″S 046°39′44″W
- Total fatalities: 199
- Total injuries: 27

Aircraft
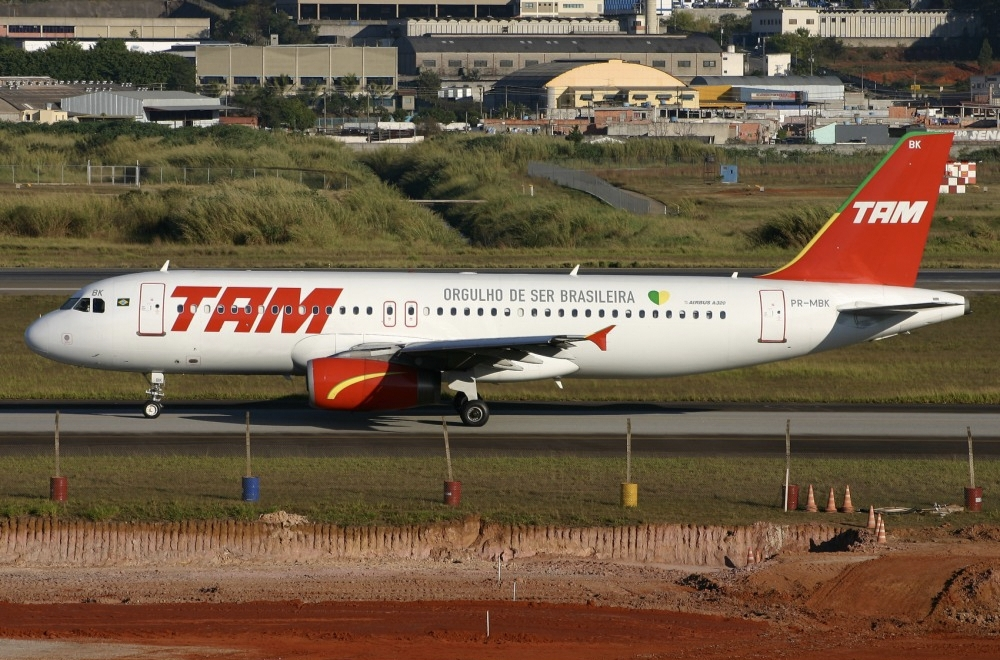
- PR-MBK, the aircraft involved in the accident, seen in June 2007
- Aircraft type: Airbus A320-233
- Operator: TAM Airlines
- IATA flight No.: JJ3054
- ICAO flight No.: TAM3054
- Call sign: TAM 3054
- Registration: PR-MBK
- Flight origin: Salgado Filho International Airport, Porto Alegre, Brazil
- Destination: São Paulo–Congonhas Airport, São Paulo, Brazil
- Occupants: 187
- Passengers: 181
- Crew: 6
- Fatalities: 187
- Survivors: 0

Ground casualties
- Ground fatalities: 12
- Ground injuries: 27

TAM Airlines Flight 3054 was a regularly scheduled domestic passenger flight operated by TAM Airlines from Porto Alegre to São Paulo, Brazil. On the evening of 17 July 2007, the Airbus A320 serving the flight from Porto Alegre overran runway 35L at São Paulo's Congonhas Airport after touching down during moderate rain and crashed into a nearby TAM Express warehouse adjacent to a gas station. The aircraft exploded on impact, killing all 187 passengers and crew on board, as well as 12 people on the ground. An additional 27 people in the warehouse were injured. The accident remains the deadliest aviation disaster in Brazilian and South American history, and was the deadliest involving the Airbus A320 series until the bombing of Metrojet Flight 9268 in 2015 killing 224 people. It was the last major fatal aviation accident in Brazil until 2024, when Voepass Linhas Aéreas Flight 2283 crashed near São Paulo killing 62 people.

The accident was investigated by the Brazilian Air Force's Aeronautical Accidents Investigation and Prevention Center (Portuguese: Centro de Investigação e Prevenção de Acidentes Aeronáuticos; CENIPA), and a final report was issued in September 2009. CENIPA concluded that the accident was caused by pilot error during the landing at São Paulo.

== Background ==
=== Congonhas runway refit ===
On both of Congonhas Airport's runways (35L/17R and 35R/17L), a slope prevented the drainage of accumulated water on the asphalt. The surface was already smooth due to excess rubber from the increased braking required on landing. There were no runway-end safety areas, as Avenida Washington Luís (a busy avenue) and several buildings and houses were located at the end of runways 35L and 35R. On 24 July 2006, less than a year before the accident, a Boeing 737 of BRA Transportes Aéreos had difficulty stopping on runway 35L, but the pilots were able to bring the aircraft to a stop safely by performing a ground loop. Due to delays and flight cancellations caused by rains in early 2007, Infraero (the company that managed Congonhas Airport then) decided to resurface the airport's main runway. The installation of channeling grooves was planned to reduce the risk of hydroplaning. The resurfacing work was completed on 29 June, but the grooves were not added. Infraero stated that adding the grooves would require an additional 30 days. Despite the incomplete refit, the Congonhas runway remained open for use during the 2006–07 Brazilian aviation crisis.

=== Landing difficulties ===
On 16 July, the day before the crash, four pilots who landed at the airport reported poor braking conditions, including a TAM pilot who managed to stop his aircraft just a few metres before the end of the runway. Between 12:25 and 12:28 p.m., Infraero suspended operations at the airport to assess the runway conditions and subsequently cleared it for use, reporting "no puddles and water slides." However, at 12:42 local time on the same day, Pantanal Linhas Aéreas Flight 4763, an ATR 42-300, hydroplaned after touching down on runway 17R. The aircraft veered to the left, striking a concrete box and a small light pole before coming to rest on the grass between the runway and taxiway. All 25 people on board survived with no injuries, but the aircraft was damaged beyond repair. Despite this incident, landings continued to be conducted normally at the airport.

=== Aircraft and crew ===
The aircraft operating as Flight 3054 was a twin turbofan Airbus A320-233, serial number 789, registration PR-MBK; it was powered by two IAE V2500 engines. It was built in 1998 and had been operated by other airlines before entering service with TAM in January 2007, six months before the accident. The aircraft was owned by Pegasus Aviation and had flown more than 21,000 hours over 10,000 cycles before the crash.

The aircraft was dispatched with the thrust reverser on the starboard engine deactivated, as it had jammed. TAM said in a statement that a fault in a reverser "does not jeopardize landings" and no mechanical problem had been recorded on 16 July, the day before the accident. The aircraft had no difficulty braking on the same runway a day before the fatal accident.

There were 6 crew members and 181 passengers on board. All 6 crew members as well as 171 of the passengers were Brazilian; the 10 remaining passengers were of various other nationalities. The flight crew consisted of 2 captains (rather than the usual captain and first officer): Henrique Stefanini Di Sacco (53) and Kleyber Aguiar Lima (54). Four flight attendants were aboard.

Both pilots had been flying for over 30 years. Stefanini had logged 13,654 flight hours in his career (including 2,236 hours on the Airbus A320), and Lima 14,760 hours, with 237 of them on the Airbus A320.

Nationality	Passengers	Crew	Ground	Total
Brazil	171	6	12	189
France	2	0	0	2
Argentina	2	0	0	2
Portugal	1	0	0	1
Sweden	1	0	0	1
United States	1	0	0	1
South Africa	2	0	0	2
Peru	1	0	0	1
Total	181	6	12	199

== Flight chronology ==
Flight 3054's route

Several players and coaches from the Grêmio football club were initially booked on Flight 3054, intending to catch a connecting flight in Congonhas and fly to Goiânia, for a game scheduled against the Goiás Esporte Clube. However, the club's management rescheduled the trip to the next day. The plane departed from Salgado Filho International Airport in Porto Alegre at 17:18 Brazilian Standard Time (BRT) (20:18 UTC). It climbed to flight level (FL) 340 (34,000 feet [10,000 m]). At 18:48 BRT (21:48 UTC), the flight made its landing at Congonhas-São Paulo Regional Airport.

== Accident ==
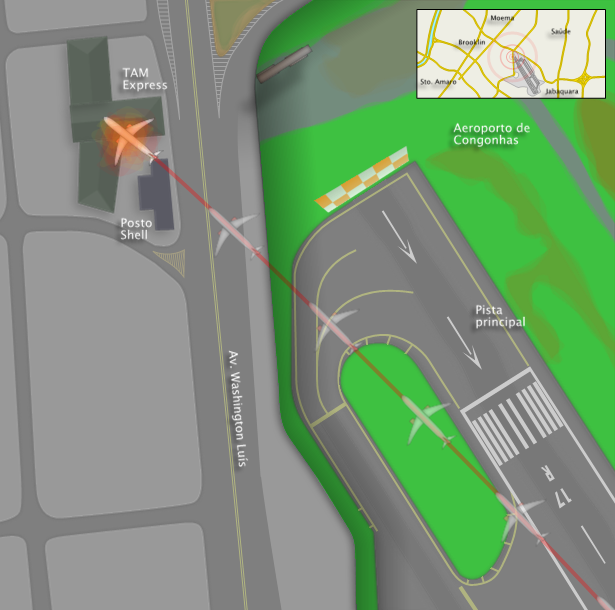
An artist's rendering showing the path of the aircraft during its final moments

Flight 3054 was cleared to land at Congonhas's Runway 35L. Reviews by government officials of the surveillance videos showed that despite the aircraft touching down without incident, it did not slow down normally, veering to the left as it departed the far end at around 90 knots (170 km/h; 100 mph). The runway is elevated above the surrounding area, and the aircraft's momentum carried it over traffic on the adjacent Avenida Washington Luís, a major thoroughfare, and crushed a four-storey TAM Express facility, resulting in a large fire. The TAM Express facility contained offices and a warehouse, and was located adjacent to a gas station, killing all 181 passengers and 6 crew members on board as well as 12 people on the ground. Inside the plane the temperature reached over 1,000 °C (1,800 °F), leaving no chance of survival.

The runway had recently been resurfaced, and did not yet have water-channeling grooves cut into it to reduce the danger of hydroplaning.

Surveillance video of Flight 3054 landing

Different angle video of Flight 3054 landing

The aircraft's flight data recorder (FDR) showed that immediately prior to touchdown, both thrust levers were in CL (or "climb") position, with engine power being governed by the flight computer's autothrottle system. Two seconds prior to touchdown, an aural warning, "retard, retard", was issued by the flight's computer system, advising the pilots to retard the thrust lever to the recommended idle lever position. This would disengage the autothrottle, with engine power then governed directly by the thrust levers.

At the moment of touchdown, the spoiler lever was in the "ARMED" position. According to the system logic of the A320's flight controls, in order for the spoilers to automatically deploy upon touchdown, not only must the spoiler lever be in the "ARMED" position, but both thrust levers must be at or close to the "idle" position. The FDR transcript shows that immediately after the warning, the flight computer recorded the left thrust lever being retarded to the rear-most position, activating the thrust reverser on the left engine, while the right thrust lever (controlling the engine with the disabled thrust reverser) remained in the CL position. One theory put forth by CENIPA is that the pilots may not have noticed that the right engine remained at CL because the Airbus autothrottle system, unlike other aircraft manufacturers, does not automatically move the levers when the autothrust controller changes engine settings. Therefore, the pilots may have thought that the right engine was at idle power without realizing that Airbus autothrust logic dictates that, when one or more of the thrust levers is pulled to the idle position, the autothrust is automatically disengaged. Thus, when the pilot pulled the left engine thrust lever to idle, it disconnected the autothrust system and the computer did not retard the right engine power to idle. The A320's spoilers did not deploy during the landing run, as the right thrust lever was above the "idle" setting required for automatic spoiler deployment. Since the right engine thrust lever was still in the "climb" detent at that time, the right engine accelerated to climb power while the left engine deployed its thrust reverser. The resulting asymmetric thrust condition resulted in a loss of control and it veered to the left and a crash ensued. It only took 16 seconds from the incorrect positioning of the thrust levers to overrunning the runway with an ensuing loss of control, and 26 seconds until the aircraft crashed.

=== Timeline ===
Time		Event
UTC	Local time (UTC−03:00)	Event
20:19	17:19	Flight 3054 departs Salgado Filho Airport after taxiing on Runway 35L
21:20	18:20	The flight begins its approach to Congonhas Airport
21:43	18:43	The pilots perform the landing checklist
21:47	18:47	Flight 3054 is cleared to land on runway 35L
21:48:24	18:48:24	Thrust levers are positioned incorrectly
21:48:26	18:48:26	Flight 3054 lands on the runway
21:48:30	18:48:30	The aircraft begins to turn left
21:48:40	18:48:40	Flight 3054 overruns the runway steering left
21:48:50	18:48:50	Flight 3054 crashes into the TAM Express building killing all of the passengers onboard as well as 12 people on the ground.

== Congonhas ==
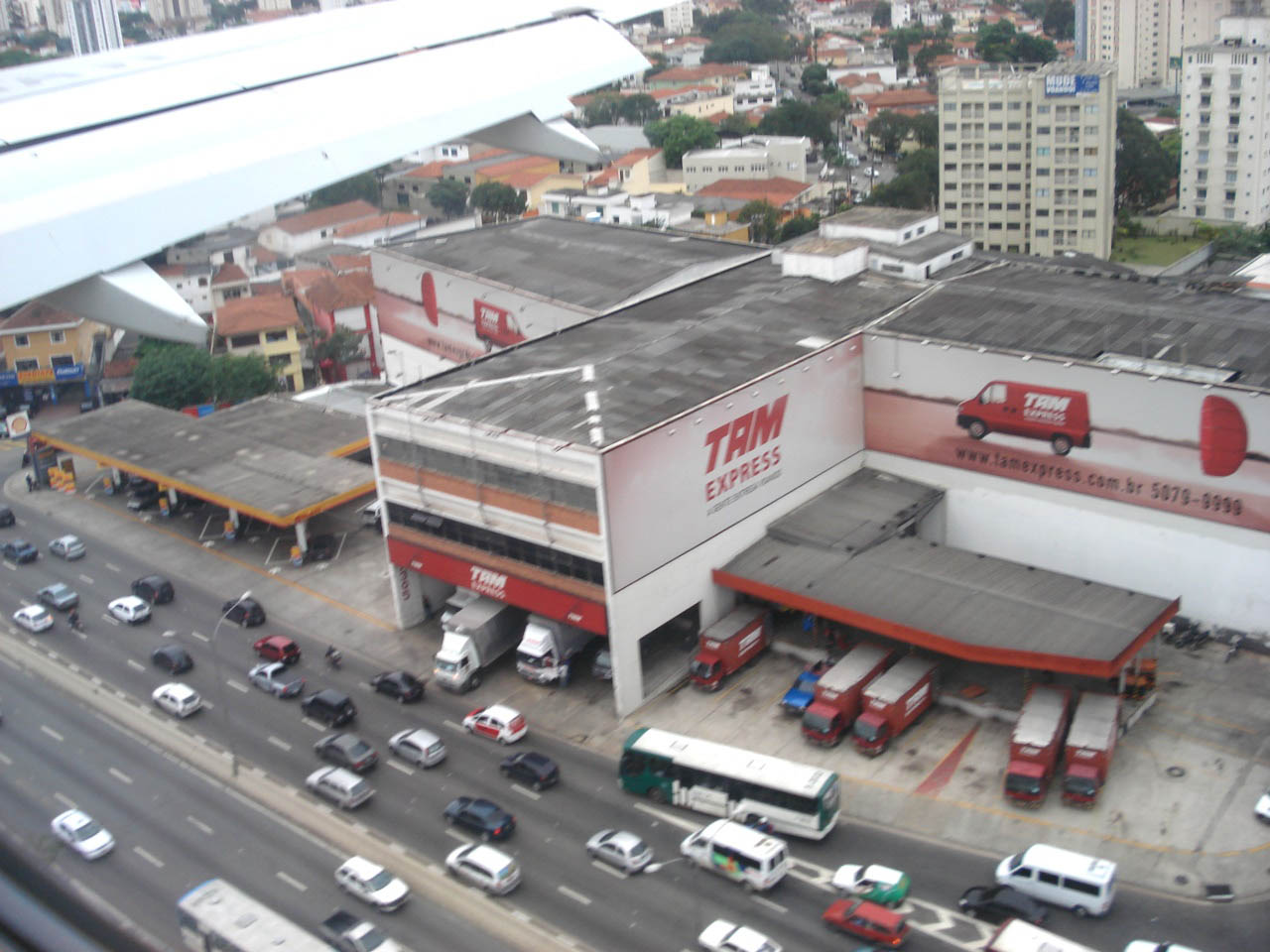
The TAM Express warehouse, seen five months before the crash

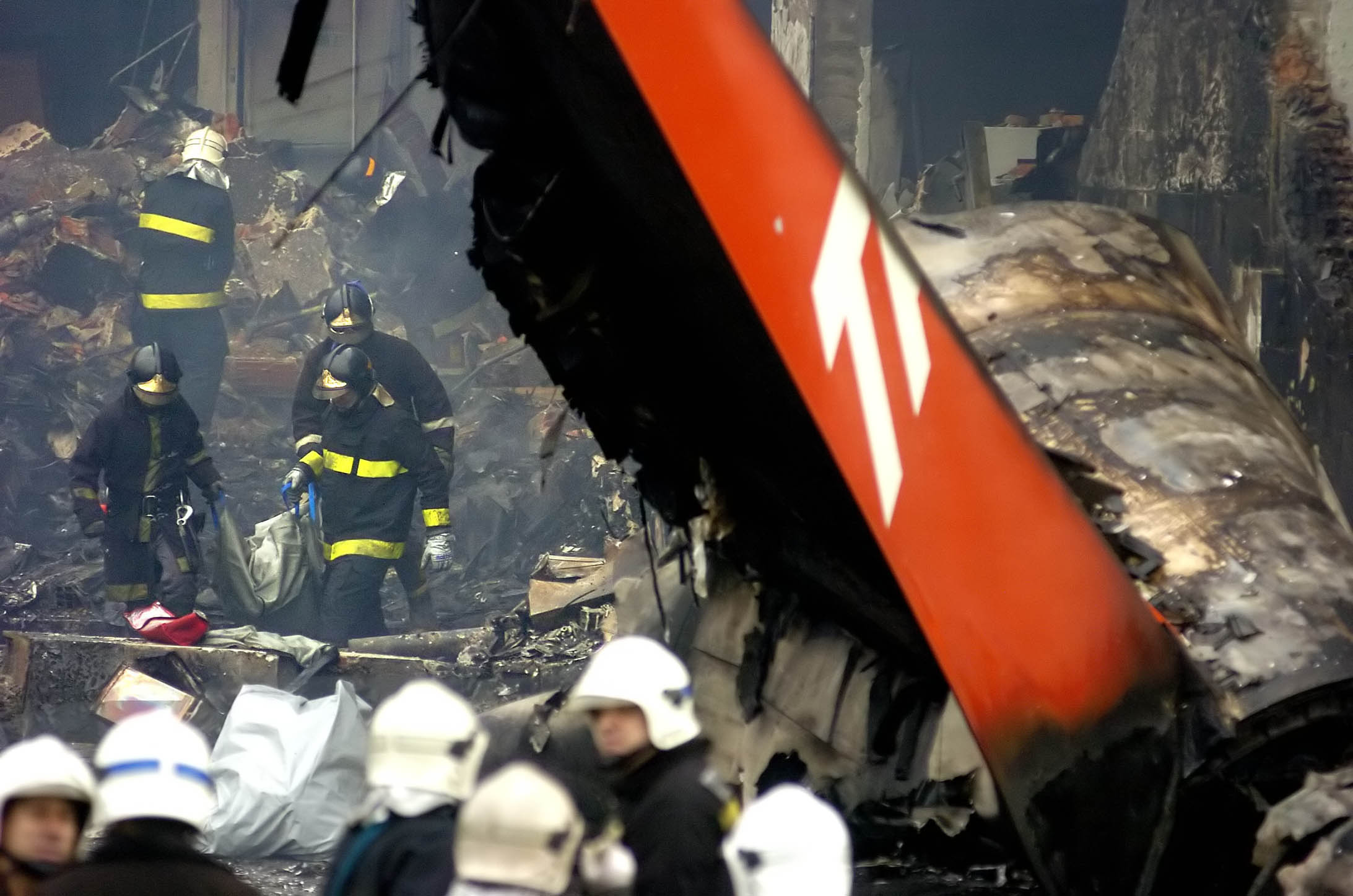
The wreckage of Flight 3054 the day after the crash

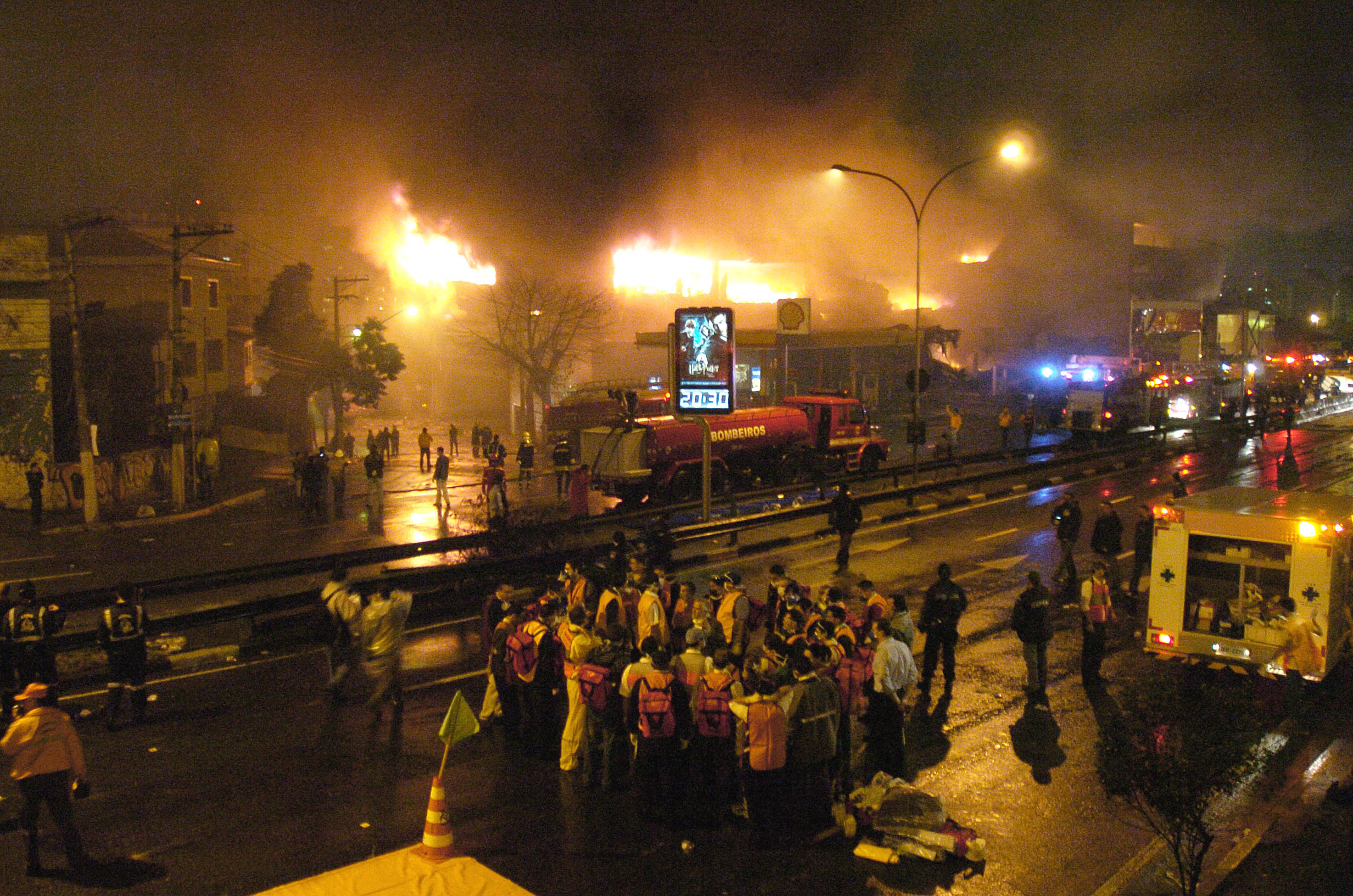
The TAM Express warehouse on fire shortly after the crash

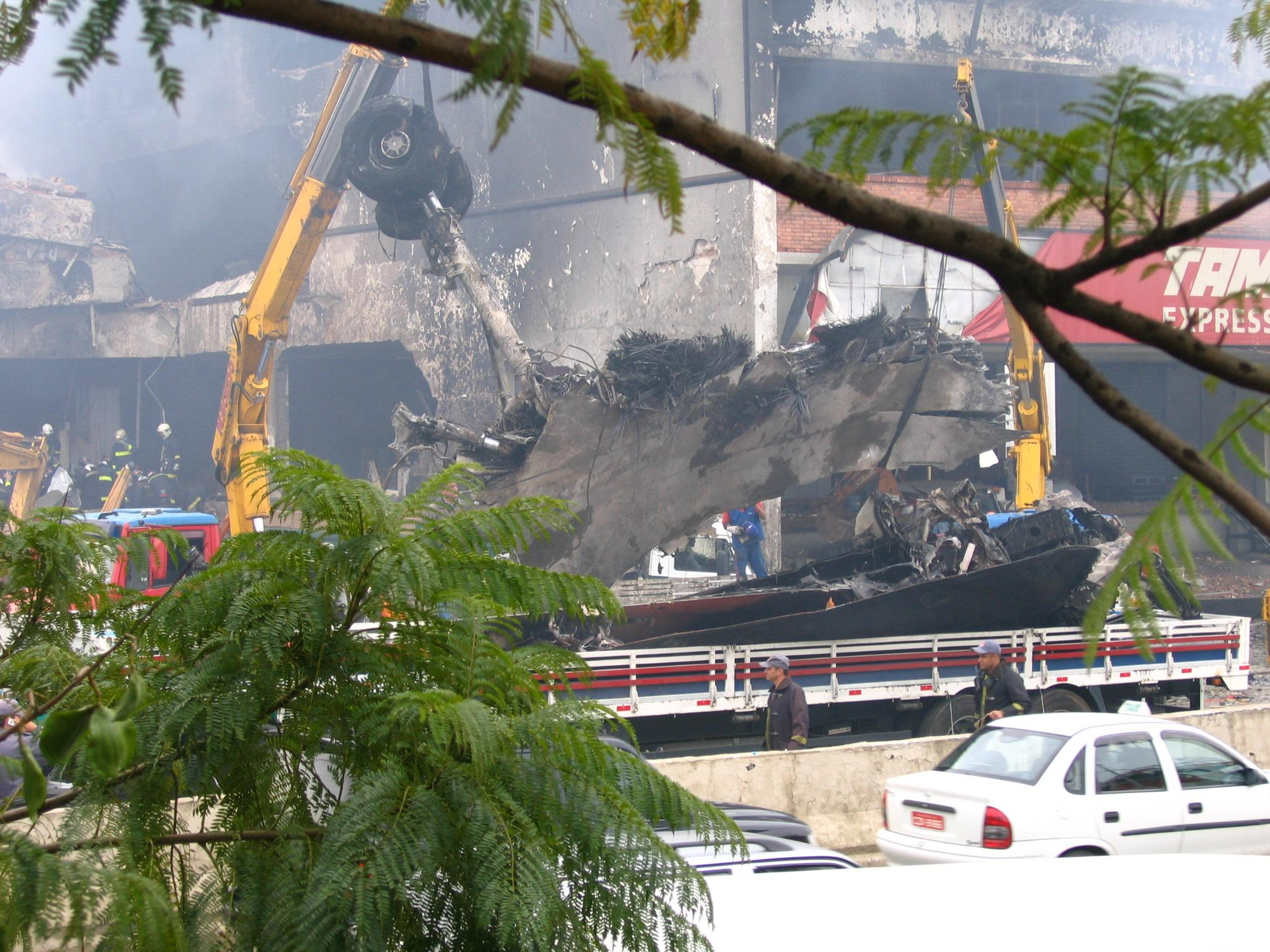
Landing gear being lifted from the warehouse

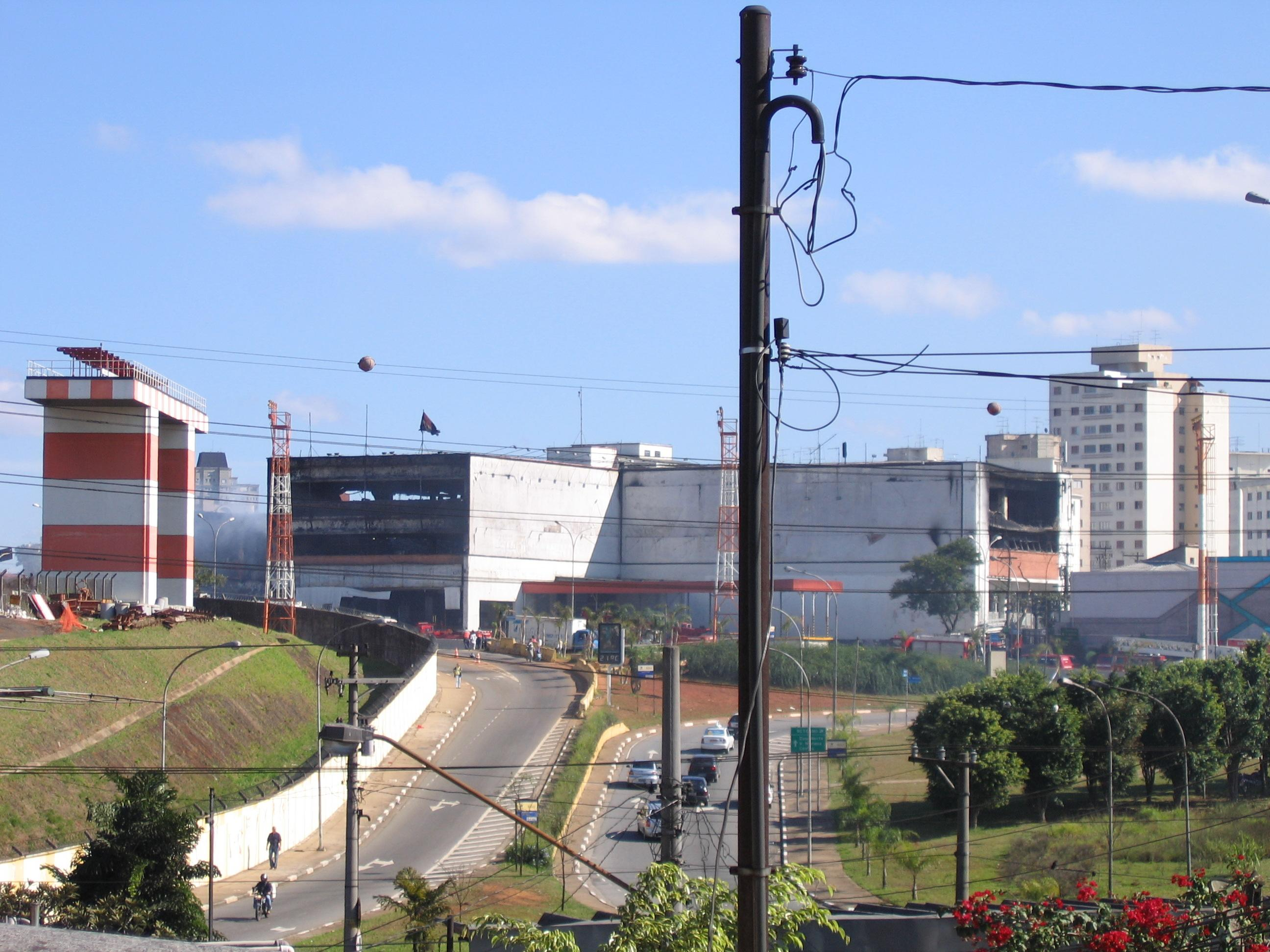
The burnt-out warehouse after the crash

Aviation safety in Brazil had been under increased scrutiny following the mid-air collision in September 2006 over the Amazon of Gol Transportes Aéreos Flight 1907, a Boeing 737-800 and an Embraer Legacy 600 (see 2006–2007 Brazilian aviation crisis).

The 35L runway at Congonhas is 1,940 metres (6,360 ft) long. Congonhas's counterpart in Rio de Janeiro, the Santos Dumont Airport, has an even shorter runway, at 1,323 m (4,341 ft). Both airports receive the same type of traffic—ranging from small private planes to Boeing 737s and A320s. Many variables affect the landing distance of an aircraft, such as approach speed, weight and the presence of either a tailwind or a headwind. For an Airbus A320, a landing speed of 20 knots (37 km/h; 23 mph) higher than normal can result in as much as a 25% increase in the runway length needed to stop an aircraft. Wet weather can also significantly reduce the braking performance of aircraft, leading to an increase in the minimum runway length requirement.

The airport is also known to be a dangerous airport in Brazil due to its runways.

Pilots have called Congonhas airport the "aircraft carrier," because of the runway's short length and because pilots are told to go around if they overshoot the first 300 metres (1,000 ft) of runway.

In June 2007, a Brazilian judge briefly banned flights using Fokker 100, Boeing 737-700 and Boeing 737-800 aircraft in and out of the airport. The Airbus A320 was not among the aircraft banned, due to its manufacturer-stated braking distance being shorter than those of the banned aircraft. Pilots had complained that water had been accumulating on the runway, reducing aircraft braking performance and occasionally causing planes to hydroplane. The judge claimed the runway needed to be 388 metres (1,273 ft) longer for these aircraft to operate safely. At the time, a spokeswoman from Brazil's National Civil Aviation Agency stated, "The safety conditions of the runway and the airport as a whole are adequate." TAM also objected to the decision, with a spokesman stating "If the injunction stands, it will cause total chaos," claiming over 10,000 passengers per day would be inconvenienced.

=== Aftermath ===
The airport reopened on 19 July 2007, using an alternative runway.

Many flights, including all OceanAir and BRA Transportes Aéreos, were transferred to Guarulhos International Airport, the major airport in São Paulo, due to the closure of the main runway at Congonhas and the ongoing investigation of the accident.

On 20 July, Presidency Chief of Staff Dilma Rousseff announced plans to significantly reduce the number of flights operating at Congonhas. The plan included banning, within 60 days, all connection, stopover, charter and international flights and the reduction in the number of private jets. The airport would only operate direct flights to certain cities in Brazil. The plan also called for a study of the expansion of São Paulo's two current airports and the construction of a third airport in the metropolitan area.

State crime scene investigators terminated the search for remains on 18 July 2007; as of that date, 114 bodies recovered from the site had been identified by the São Paulo Medical Examiner's Office as those of passengers.

== Investigation ==
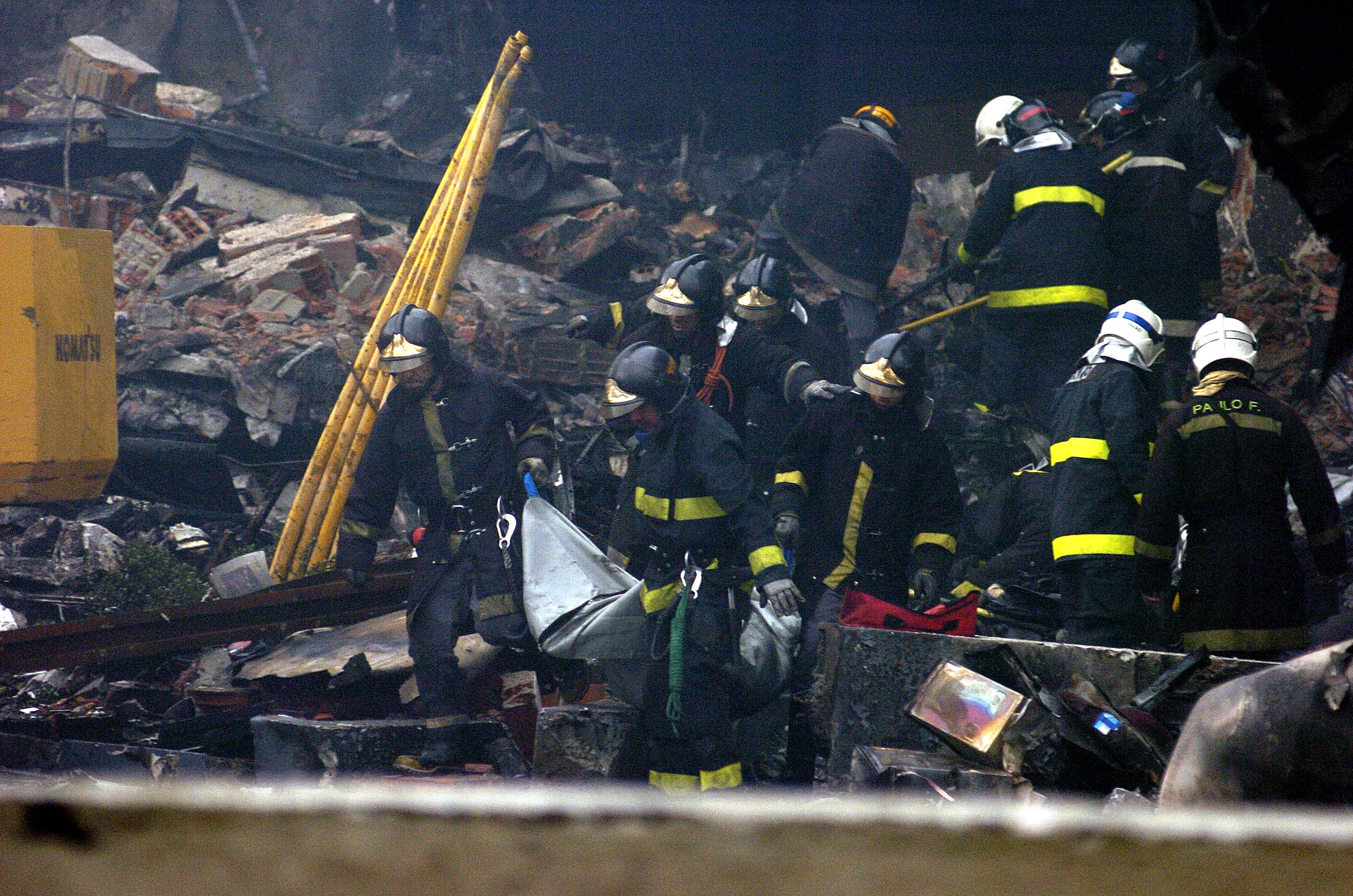
The wreckage of Flight 3054

The investigation was carried out by Brazil's Aeronautical Accidents Investigation and Prevention Center (CENIPA). Data from the flight data recorder and cockpit voice recorder (CVR) were downloaded by the National Transportation Safety Board (NTSB) in the United States commencing 20 and 23 July respectively. Based on preliminary data from the FDR, on 25 July Airbus cautioned A320 operators to ensure that both thrust levers are set to idle during flare. The transcript of the CVR was released on 1 August. It shows that the pilots were aware of the wet runway conditions and the deactivated thrust reverser. The pilots' comments suggest that the spoilers did not deploy and that they were unable to slow the aircraft. Crew error had not been ruled out.

An investigation by the Ministry of Justice and Public Security released in November 2008 concluded that the pilots mistakenly left the lever for the right engine to "climb" upon landing, due to a mistake in landing procedures with the right thrust reverser being disabled from a prior maintenance, when in fact it was necessary to retard both engines in order for the spoilers to work. They also said that the National Civil Aviation Agency should have closed the airport on the night the plane landed because of heavy rains; that Congonhas airport authorities shared the blame because its runway had not been properly constructed with grooves to drain away excess rainwater, contributing to the crash; that the plane's manufacturer, Airbus, should have provided alarms warning the pilots that the braking system was failing; and that TAM failed to properly train its pilots, who did not act correctly in the emergency.

=== Final report ===
In September 2009, more than two years after the accident, CENIPA announced the results of official investigations. The report shows that one of the thrust levers, which control engines, was in position to accelerate when it should be in idle, but it was not proved if there was mechanical or human failure as the cause of the accident.

The report suggests two hypotheses for the accident. In the first, there was a flaw in the power control of the plane's engines, which would have kept one of the thrust levers into acceleration, regardless of their actual position. This scenario would implicate mechanical failure of the aircraft as the cause of the accident. The likelihood of this failure occurring is calculated at once per 400 billion flight hours, and therefore highly improbable. In the second hypothesis, the pilot has performed a procedure different from that provided in the manual, and put the thrust lever in an irregular position. This scenario would implicate human error as the cause of the accident.

In addition to the positions of the thrust levers, the report points to several factors that may have contributed to the accident, such as a high volume of rain on the day, with the formation of puddles on the runway, as well as the absence of grooving. The report does not blame the length of the runway for the accident. The BEA also cleared Airbus of any misdoing because they had proposed a system warning modification regarding the incorrect thrust lever positions that TAM had rejected.

== Response ==
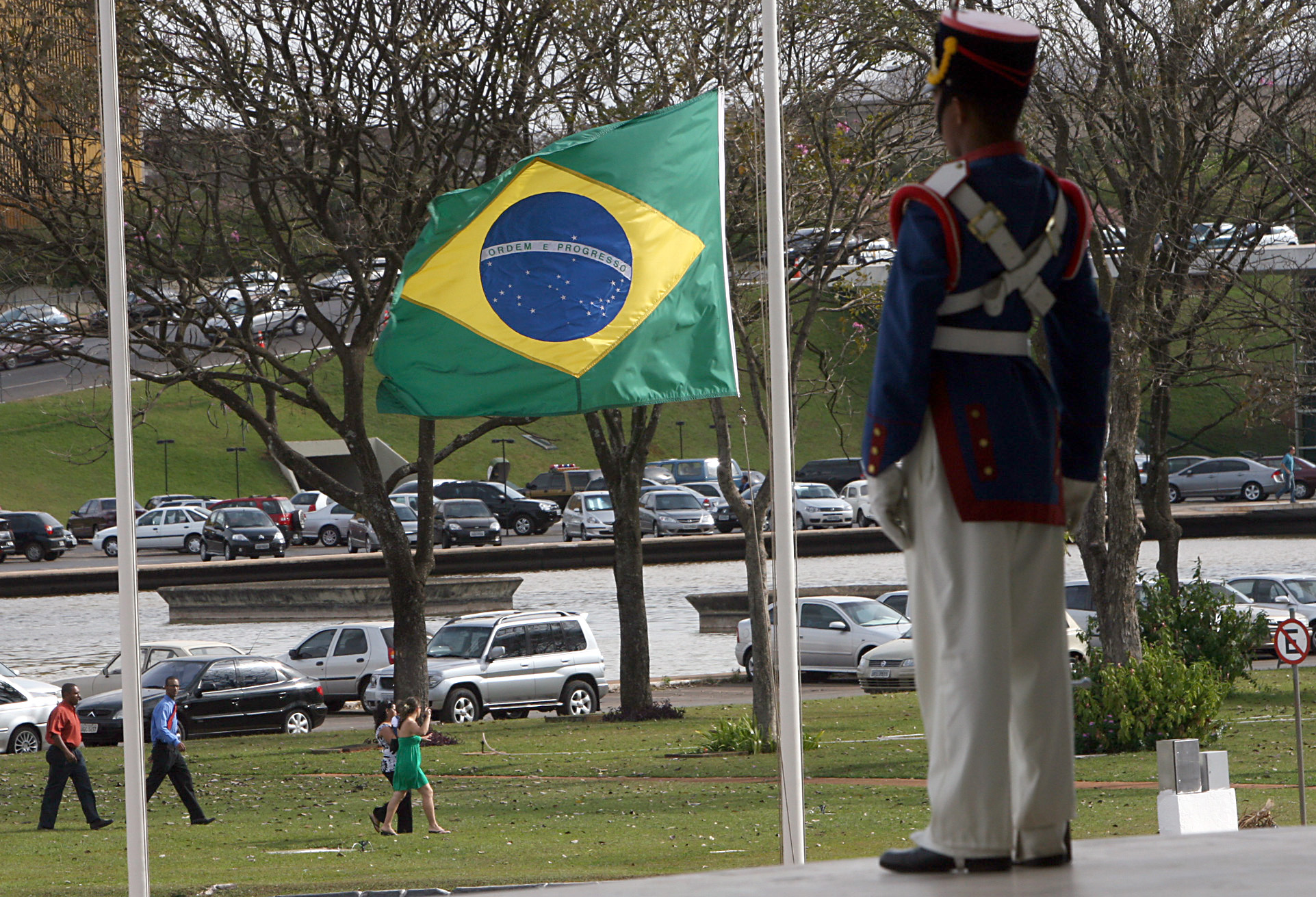
The Brazilian flag being flown at half-staff in Brasília on the anniversary of Flight 3054

After the crash, President Luiz Inácio Lula da Silva ordered three days of national mourning.

During the 2007 Pan American Games in Rio de Janeiro, the Brazilian athletes wore a black armband in remembrance of the victims. The flags of all participating countries were flown at half-staff on 18 July. Matches involving a Brazilian athlete or team started with a minute of silence.

All matches of the Campeonato Brasileiro 2007 also started with a minute of silence, while all players also wore black armbands. Brazilian Formula One driver Felipe Massa had a black stripe on top of his helmet during the 2007 European Grand Prix, to commemorate the victims. Rubens Barrichello also had stripes on his helmet, and the two Red Bull Racing drivers David Coulthard and Mark Webber had small Brazilian flags on their helmets referring to the accident.

More than 5,000 Brazilians marched to the crash site on 29 July 2007, blaming their government's failure to invest in airport infrastructure for the crash. Many of the protesters also demanded Lula's ouster.

=== International reactions ===
Reactions shown internationally were strong all expressed condolences.

- Argentina: President Néstor Kirchner called president Lula to express condolences.
- Chile: President Michelle Bachelet called president Lula to offer her condolences.
- China: President Hu Jintao expressed his condolences to the Brazilian government as well as the friends and families of the victims.
- Germany: President Horst Köhler sent a telegram to President Lula expressing his condolences to the families of the victims. According to a statement reported by the German embassy in Brasília, Germany would join the three-day mourning by lowering the flag at half-staff at the embassy.
- Mexico: Former president Vicente Fox expressed his condolences.
- Peru: President Alan Garcia expressed his condolences and requested to talk with president Lula.
- Spain: Felipe VI of Spain was in Brazil at the time of the accident and expressed condolences.
- United States: President George W. Bush, his spokesman Sean McCormack, and secretary of state Condoleezza Rice all expressed their condolences. Rice also called Brazilian Foreign Minister Celso Amorim to express additional condolences.
- Vatican: Odilo Scherer, the Archbishop of São Paulo, received a telegram from Pope Benedict XVI signed by the Vatican's secretary of state Tarcisio Bertone, expressing condolences as well as a mass for the victims.
- Venezuela: Foreign minister Nicolás Maduro expressed his condolences to Brazil's government and citizens.

=== Memorial ===
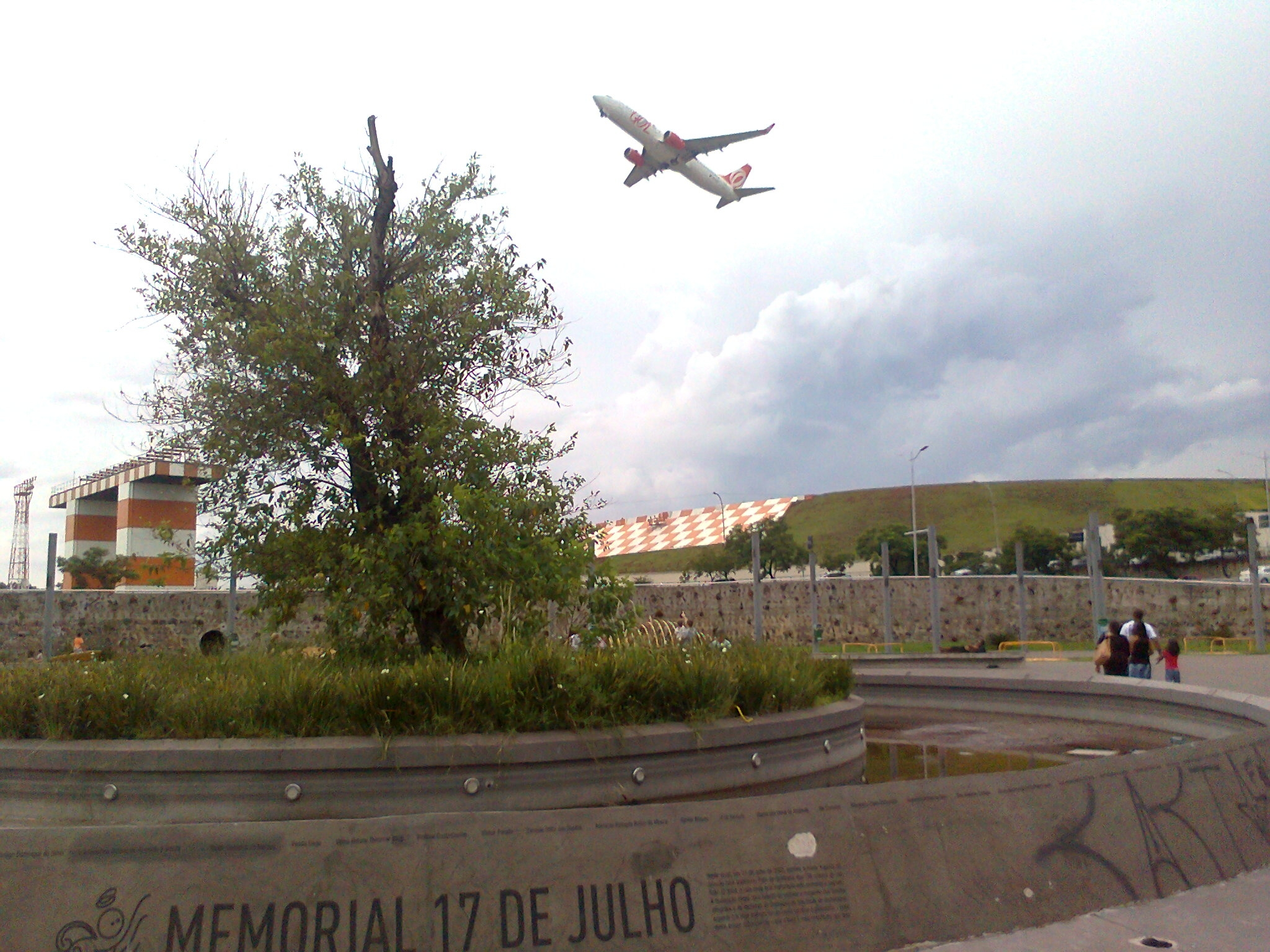
Memorial at the site of the accident

On 17 July 2012, the fifth anniversary of the accident, a plaza named Memorial Square was opened. Memorial Square was built on the site of the TAM express warehouse (demolished on 5 August 2007), which is 8,318 square metres (89,530 sq ft) in area. There is a memorial with the names of the victims engraved as well as a mulberry tree that survived the crash. There is another memorial in Porto Alegre called "Largo da Vida," where 199 trees have been planted. The memorial is located near Salgado Filho International Airport (the airport from which Flight 3054 departed).

== Legal action ==
On 19 November 2008, the 13,600-page police investigation was completed, which took 16 months of research to produce, during which 336 people were heard. Federal prosecutors were of the opinion that the former director of the National Civil Aviation Agency (ANAC), Denise Abreu (who had taken up the post in March 2006), and the flight safety officer of the airline, Marco Aurelio dos Santos de Miranda, should both face criminal charges. In 2011, the Brazilian Federal Public Ministry (Ministério Público Federal—MPF) laid criminal charges against Abreu and Miranda, as well as Alberto Fajerman, TAM's vice president of operations. They were accused of neglecting air transport safety by allowing the aircraft to land in heavy rain on the notoriously short, recently resurfaced runway before cutting of grooves to channel away excess rainwater. The trial began in São Paulo in 2013. In 2014, MPF withdrew the charges against Fajerman, for lack of evidence. A second charge against Abreu of "documentary falsehood" was dismissed in November 2014. All of the accused were eventually acquitted of all charges.

In 2014, TAM's insurer, Itaú Seguros, launched a lawsuit in Brazil against Airbus for R$350 million (US$156 million). Airbus's response blamed the accident on the cockpit crew, the airline, and the poor state of the runway.

== Notable victims ==
Among the victims were:

- Júlio Redecker (aged 51), a Brazilian Social Democracy Party federal politician, member and leader of the opposition in the Chamber of Deputies of Brazil
- Paulo Rogério Amoretty Souza (aged 61), former chairman of the football team Sport Club Internacional and attorney for Sport Club Corinthians Paulista
- Márcio Rogério de Andrade (aged 35), former football player and FIFA agent at the time of the crash. His wife, daughter and brother-in-law were also killed.

== Dramatization ==
The documentary television series Mayday, also known as Air Disasters, examined the crash and investigation in an eleventh-season episode titled "Deadly Reputation" (and alternatively "Nightmare Runway" and "Disaster Runway"), which features interviews with investigators and a dramatic recreation of the accident.

== See also ==
- Philippine Airlines Flight 137 – another Airbus A320 that crashed nine years earlier under almost identical circumstances, with 3 fatalities
- S7 Airlines Flight 778 – an Airbus A310 that crashed one year earlier also with a deactivated thrust reverser, killing 125 people
- TAP Flight 425 – a Boeing 727 that overran a runway and fell down an embankment, killing 131
- Air India Express Flight 812 – a Boeing 737 that overran a tabletop runway and plunged into a ditch, killing 158
- TACA Flight 390 – another Airbus A320 that crashed into a neighborhood after overrunning the runway, killing 5
- Jeju Air Flight 2216 – a Boeing 737 that crashed into a concrete barrier after a belly landing and runway excursion, killing 179
