= Scrim =

Scrim can refer to:

- Scrim (material), either of two types of material (a lightweight, translucent fabric or a coarse, heavy material)
- Scrim (lighting), a device used in lighting for films
- Scrim (internet slang), friendly match between teams and clans in various ladders, shorthand for: scrimmage.
- SCRIM, Sideway-force Coefficient Routine Investigation Machine
- Colin Scrimgeour ("Uncle Scrim", 1903-1987), a New Zealand Methodist minister and broadcaster
- Scott Arceneaux Jr. (known as Scrim), member of New Orleans hip-hop group Suicideboys
- Scrim, a runaway dog who eluded capture in New Orleans for nearly a year

== See also ==
- Scrim and sarking
- Scrimmage (disambiguation)
