= ISO 15398 =

ISO standard for thermoplastic manhole covers

The ISO-standard ISO 15398 regulates the minimum requirements, proofs of suitability and auditing standards for manhole covers made of thermoplastics.

The complete title of the norm is Specification for thermoplastics covers and frames for manholes and inspection chambers used in non-traffic areas. Issue date: 1. December 2012. The norm is in English.

The constraint "non-traffic areas" is also the crucial difference to the general European Standard for manhole covers EN124, which is only for vehicular access areas.

Plastic-manhole covers according to ISO 15398 are designated for the commitment on control- and inspection chambers in pedestrian (class A 15) and light vehicular areas (max. class B 125).

Moreover, only manhole covers made of thermoplastics and with a maximum of DN 600 are regulated.

The pressure-/load proofs of the EN 124:1994 are the foundation of the proofs of suitability, which the ISO 15398 pretends. Additional to this you have to render comprehensive material specific proofs - e.g. impact resistance, cold-climate-crack-test, UV-resistance of the introduced plastics. Also safety features like surface condition, skid resistance and the accuracy of fit are defined.
