= Road slipperiness =

Low skid resistance condition

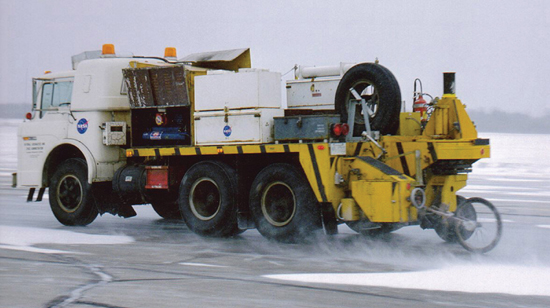
A surface friction tester, used to measure road slipperiness

Road slipperiness is a condition of low skid resistance due to insufficient road friction. It is a result of snow, ice, water, loose material and the texture of the road surface on the traction produced by the wheels of a vehicle.

Road slipperiness can be measured either in terms of the friction between a freely-spinning wheel and the ground, or the braking distance of a braking vehicle, and is related to the coefficient of friction between the tyre and the road surface.

Public works agencies spend a sizeable portion of their budget measuring and reducing road slipperiness. Even a small increase in slipperiness of a section of road can increase the accident rate of the section of road tenfold. Maintenance activities affecting slipperiness include drainage repair, snow removal and street sweeping. More intensive measures may include grinding or milling a surface that has worn smooth, a surface treatment such as a chipseal, or overlaying a new layer of asphalt.

A specific road safety problem is split friction or μ (mu) - split; when the friction significantly differs between the left and the right wheelpath. The road may then not be perceived as hazardous when accelerating, cruising or even braking softly, but in a case of hard braking, the difference in friction will cause the vehicle to start to rotate towards the side offering higher grip. Split friction may cause jack-knifing of articulated trucks, while trucks with towed trailers may experience trailer swing phenomena. Split friction may be caused by an improper road spot repair that results in high variance of texture (roads) and colour (thin ice on newly paved black spots thaws faster than ice on old greyish asphalt) across the road section.

== Measurement ==
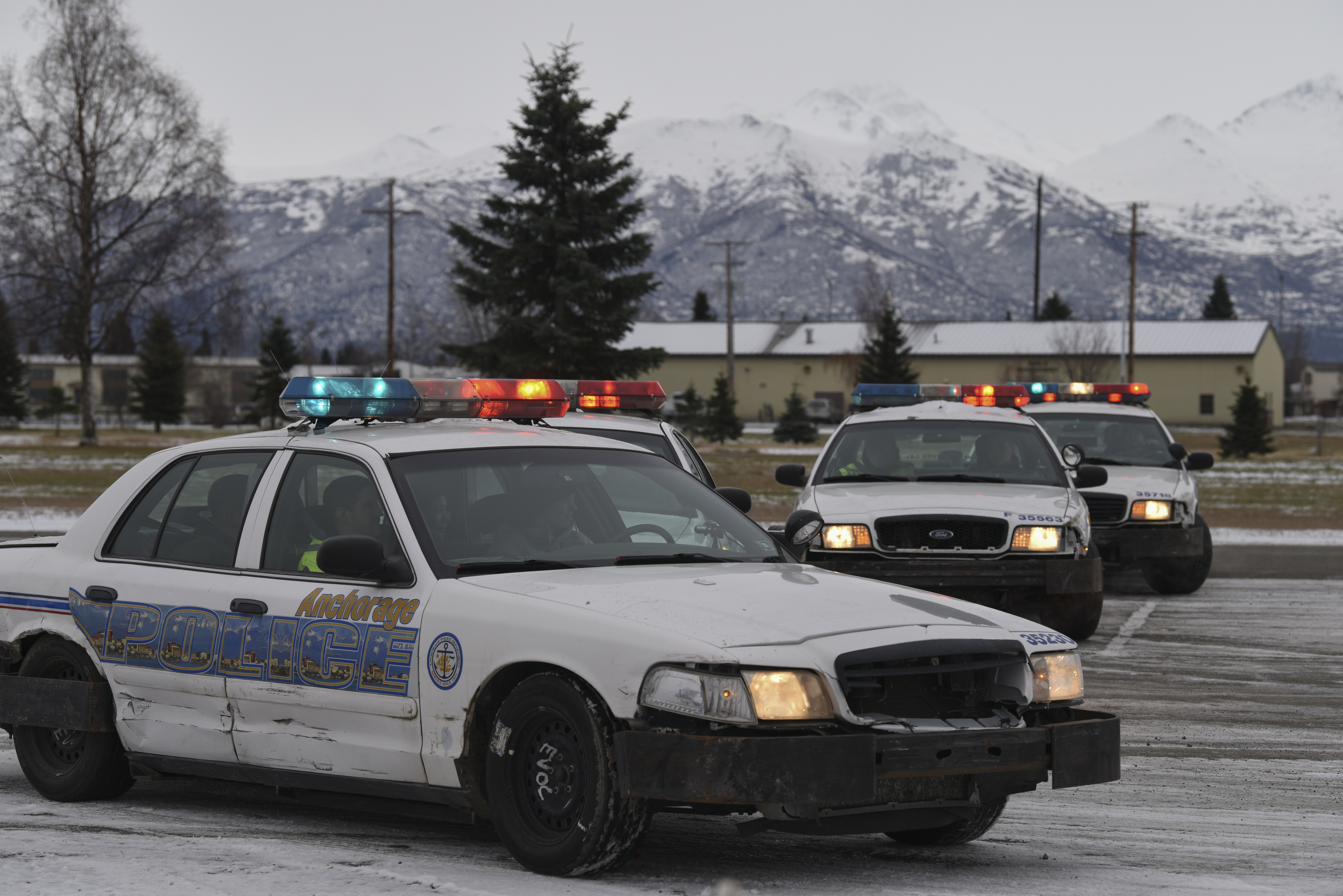
Anchorage Police Department recruits carrying out an emergency vehicle operations training course (including training on how to handle skidding) at Joint Base Elmendorf-Richardson in Anchorage, Alaska using modified Ford Crown Victoria Police Interceptors

The two ways to measure road slipperiness are surface friction testing and stopping distance testing. Friction testing can use surface friction testers or portable friction testers, and involves allowing a freely moving object, usually a wheel, to move against the surface. By measuring the resistance experienced by the wheel, the friction between the ground and the wheel can be found.

Stopping distance testing involves performing an emergency stop in a test vehicle and measuring the distance required to come to a stop. This can be measured either from the length of the skid marks left by the vehicle, or by the "chalk-to-gun" method, where the brakes are connected to a small gun filled with chalk powder, which marks the point when the brakes were applied. This has the advantage of measuring the full stopping distance, while simply measuring the skid marks only measures the distance from the point where the wheels began to lock or slip.

Measurement of skidding resistance is not yet universally harmononised despite a number of attempts such as FEHRL's HERMES project. The European Standards Organisation (CEN)has been working on the topic for many years through its committee CEN/TC 227 - Road materials. Contributions to this were made through the FP7 Tyrosafe project which aims to raise awareness, to coordinate and prepare for European harmonisation and to optimise the assessment and management of essential tyre/road interaction parameters in order to increase safety and support greening of road transport. This project will provide a synopsis of the current state of scientific understanding and its current application in different standards. It will identify the needs for future research and propose a way forward in the context of the future objectives of road administrations in order to optimise three key properties of roads: skid resistance, rolling resistance and tyre/road noise emission.

== Reduction ==
Dutch newsreel about the anti-skid training school of Rob Slotemaker

Road slipperiness can contribute to car accidents. In 1997, over 53,000 accidents were caused by slippery roads in the United Kingdom out of an estimated 4,000,000 accidents (or approximately 1.3 per cent) . A small change in road slipperiness can have a drastic effect on surface friction: decreasing the coefficient of friction from 0.45 to 0.35, equivalent to adding a dusting of wet snow, increased the accident rate by almost 1000%. As such, road agencies have a number of approaches to decreasing road slipperiness. Most roads are designed with a convex camber to provide sufficient drainage, thereby allowing surface water to drain out of the road. Trouble sections include entrances and exits of banked outercurves, where the cross slope is close to zero. Unless these sections have a longitudinal grade of at least 0.4–0.5%, the drainage gradient (resultant to crossfall and longitudinal grade) will be lower than 0.5% so water will not run off the road surface. Storm drains may be installed at regular intervals and modern paving materials are designed to provide high friction in most conditions. Permeable paving allows water to soak through the paving material, reducing slipperiness in very adverse conditions.

Road slipperiness can be prevented or delayed by proper pavement design. The aggregate used in the pavement should be selected with care, as certain aggregates such as dolomite may polish, or wear smooth under the action of tires. With asphalt pavements and surface treatments, using too much asphalt or asphalt emulsion can cause bleeding or flushing, a condition where excess asphalt rises to the top and fills in the road texture. Both problems increase slipperiness, especially when the pavement is wet.

Once lost, pavement texture can be restored with retexturing procedures such as diamond grinding of pavement, surface treatments such as chipsealing and resurfacing with asphalt concrete.

Snow and ice removal also decreases road slipperiness; snowploughs and snow blowers can remove the snow from the road surface while gritters drop road salt and sand, which both melts the snow and ice from the road surface, and provide a rougher surface to grip onto. However, in dry conditions, sand and salt on the road surface can themselves increase road slipperiness and pose a danger to road traffic, and therefore, roads are cleared by street sweepers after roadworks and gritting to make sure that all the loose material is cleared from the road surface.

== See also ==
- Assured Clear Distance Ahead
- Bleeding (roads)
- De-ice
- Aquaplaning
- Dolomitic limestone
- Epoxy
- Road surface
- SCRIM machine
- Smart highway
- Slipperiness
