= Lucas Redecker =

Brazilian politician

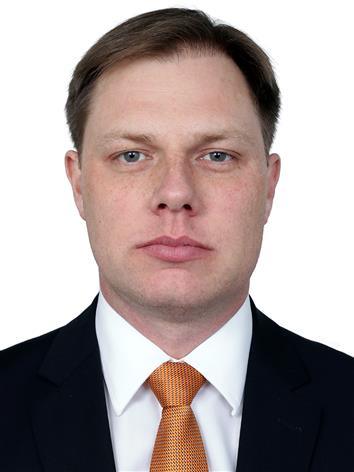
- Official portrait, 2019

Member of the Chamber of Deputies
- Incumbent
- Assumed office 1 February 2019
- Constituency: Rio Grande do Sul

Member of the Legislative Assembly of Rio Grande do Sul
- In office 1 February 2011 – 1 February 2019
- Constituency: At-large

Personal details
- Born: Lucas Bello Redecker; 26 May 1981 (age 45) Novo Hamburgo, Rio Grande do Sul, Brazil
- Party: PSD (since 2026)
- Other political affiliations: PPB (1997–2003); PSDB (2003–2026)
- Parent: Júlio Redecker (father)
- Website: lucasredecker.com

Lucas Bello Redecker (26 May 1981) is a Brazilian politician affiliated with the Social Democratic Party (PSD). Son of former federal deputy Júlio Redecker, Lucas is currently a federal deputy for Rio Grande do Sul and was once a state deputy in the state.

== Biography ==
=== First years and education ===
Of German descent, Lucas Redecker was born on May 26, 1981, in the city of Novo Hamburgo, in the interior of the state of Rio Grande do Sul, the first-born son of politician Júlio Redecker and educator Salete Bello Redecker.

She has incomplete degrees in law from the University of Vale do Rio dos Sinos (Unisinos) and veterinary medicine from the Lutheran University of Brazil (ULBRA).

=== Political ===
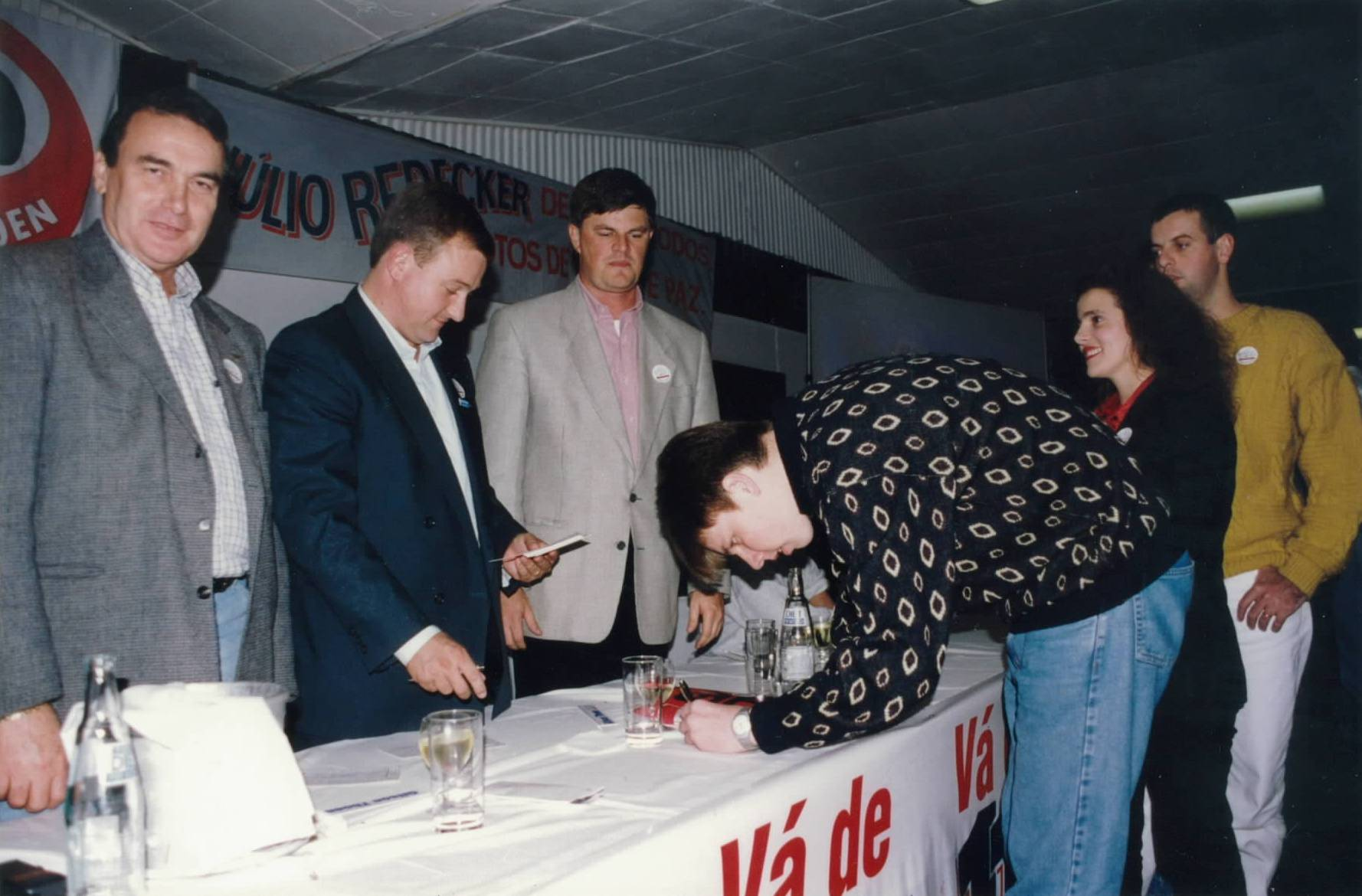
Lucas Redecker joins the PPB

He began his political activism in the Brazilian Progressive Party (PPB), becoming president of the Gaúcha Progressive Youth, but left the party after his father joined the Brazilian Social Democracy Party (PSDB) due to disagreements over joining the Lula government's base. Affiliated to the PSDB, in 2004 he ran for mayor of Novo Hamburgo, obtaining 9% of the votes in the election and finishing in 4th place.

In 2007, his father, Júlio Redecker, died in a plane crash in São Paulo. That same year, he was elected president of Juventude Tucana, the youth wing of the PSDB in Rio Grande do Sul. The following year, he ran for deputy mayor on the ticket of Jair Foscarini (PMDB), who was seeking re-election. The ticket finished in second place and was defeated by Tarcisio Zimmermann of the Workers' Party (PT).

In the 2010 state elections, he was elected state deputy as the fifth most voted candidate in the whole state, being the most voted among the PSDB gaucho candidates. Redecker, following his party, was part of the opposition to the PT government of Tarso Genro, articulating the establishment of the parliamentary inquiry committee (CPI) about electricity, which aimed to monitor the supply of electricity in the state, serving as president of the commission after it was installed. He also led the PSDB caucus in the Legislative Assembly of Rio Grande do Sul (ALRS) and was a full member of the Economy and Constitution and Justice committees. In 2014, he was re-elected to office. In his second term in office, he spent the first two years on leave to lead the Mines and Energy Secretariat in the government of José Ivo Sartori (PMDB). As state secretary, he sought to encourage investment in renewable energies, such as solar and wind power. In December 2016, Redecker announced his intention to return to the Legislative Assembly, handing over the post to the deputy secretary of the portfolio, Artur Lemos, also from the PSDB.

As a state deputy, he was against holding a plebiscite on the privatization of certain state-owned companies in conjunction with the elections because he thought it was inappropriate to deal with these issues with a popular consultation linked to the general elections, but he stressed that he was in favour of privatizations. He was on leave during the votes on the State Fiscal Responsibility Law, the abolition of foundations and the increase in the Tax on the Circulation of Goods and Services (ICMS) tax.

In the transition to Eduardo Leite's government, he was selected as head of the government transition team, articulating the extension of the increased ICMS rates and approval of the constitutional amendment to allow privatizations without plebiscites.

In the 2018 state elections, Lucas was elected federal deputy. During his time in the House, Lucas chronologically voted in favor of Provisional Measure 867 (which, according to environmentalists, would have changed the Forest Code and given amnesty to deforesters), in favor of criminalizing those responsible for dam collapses, in favor of the Pension Reform and against excluding teachers from its rules, against the increase in the party fund, against including LGBTQ policies in the Human Rights portfolio, in favor of Bill 3723, which regulates the practice of snipers and hunters, Anti-Crime Package proposed by Sergio Moro, in favor of the new Legal Framework for Sanitation, against reducing the party fund, in favor of suspending the mandate of congressman Wilson Santiago, in favor of relaxing labor regulations during the pandemic, in favor of freezing the salaries of public servants, in favor of granting amnesty for church debts, in favor of calling for an Inter-American Convention against Racism, twice in favor of allocating funds from the new FUNDEB to church-affiliated schools, in favor of granting autonomy to the Central Bank of Brazil, against maintaining the imprisonment of pro-Bolsonaro congressman Daniel Silveira, against the validation of the Parliamentary Immunity PEC, in favor of the Emergency PEC (which extends the Emergency Aid for three more months at a lower amount), in favor of allowing companies to purchase COVID-19 vaccines without donating to the SUS, in favor of classifying education as an "essential service" (allowing the resumption of in-person classes during the pandemic), and in favor of privatizing the state energy company Eletrobras.

In 2021, he appeared on the list of 30 parliamentarians investigated by the newspaper O Estado de S. Paulo, which tracked down politicians who had allocated public funds for the purchase of tractors and agricultural machinery in transactions under suspicion of overbilling, this procedure was done by cross-referencing data from an internal spreadsheet of the Ministry of Regional Development and a report from the Comptroller General of the Union (CGU), in addition to Redecker, three other deputies from Rio Grande do Sul appear on the list, they are: Giovani Cherini, Marlon Santos and Maurício Dziedricki.

In the 2022 election, he was elected to a second term in the Chamber of Deputies in Brasília. He declared his vote for far-right president Jair Bolsonaro against Luiz Inácio Lula da Silva in the 2022 presidential election. After more than twenty years as a member of the PSDB, he left the party. In March 2026, he joined the Social Democratic Party (PSD) at a ceremony attended by Eduardo Leite, Gilberto Kassab, and Antonio Brito. Running on behalf of the new party, he was elected to a third term in 2026 after receiving nearly 100,000 votes.

=== Electoral history ===
Year	Election	Office	Party	Coalition	Alternates	Votes	Result	Ref.
2004	Municipal of Novo Hamburgo	Mayor	PSDB	No coalition	No data	13,485 (9.74%)	Not elected (4th place)	
2008	Municipal of Novo Hamburgo	Deputy Mayor	PSDB	PSDB / PMDB / PMN / DEM / PV / PTdoB / PSB / PP / PHS	Running mate of Jair Foscarini (PMDB)	57,921 (42.19%)	Not elected (2nd place)	
2010	State election in Rio Grande do Sul	State Deputy	PSDB	PSDB / PRB / PSL / PSC / PPS / PHS / PTdoB	Elisabete Felice (PSDB), Jorge Drumm (PSDB)	69,043 (1.22%)	Elected (5th most voted, 1st in the coalition)	
2014	State election in Rio Grande do Sul	State Deputy	PSDB	PSDB / SD / PRB	Zilá Breitenbach (PSDB), Sanchotene Felice (PSDB)	96,561 (1.73%)	Re-elected (2nd most voted, 1st in the coalition)	
2018	State election in Rio Grande do Sul	Federal Deputy	PSDB	PSDB / PTB / PP / PRB / REDE	Ronaldo Santini (PTB), Ronaldo Nogueira (PTB)	114,346 (2.08%)	Elected (7th most voted, 1st in the coalition)	
2022	State election in Rio Grande do Sul	Federal Deputy	PSDB	Fed. PSDB/ Cidadania/ MDB/ UNIÃO/ PSD/ PODE		119,069 (1.93%)	Elected (11th most voted, 4st in the coalition)	
2026	State election in Rio Grande do Sul	Federal Deputy	PSD	MDB / PSD / PRD / SD / UNIÃO / AGIR		99,817 (1.63%)	Re-elected (17th most voted, 2nd in the party)	

== Personal life ==
Since March 2015 he has been married to journalist Manuela Redecke, with whom he had a son, João Lucas, in 2017. In religion, he is a practicing Lutheran.
