= Scrum =

Scrum may refer to:

- Autozam Scrum, a microvan and pickup truck sold in Japan by Mazda
- Line of scrimmage, line separating football teams before a play
- Media scrum, an impromptu press conference, often held immediately outside an event such as a legislative session or meeting
- "Scrum", a song on the album Diabolus in Musica by Slayer
- Scrum, an offensive melee formation in Japanese game bo-taoshi
- Scrum (rugby), a method of restarting play in rugby union and rugby league
  - Scrum (rugby union), scrum in rugby union
- Scrum (project management), a framework used to develop and manage projects, originally for software

== See also ==
- Scram (disambiguation)
- Scrim (disambiguation)
