= Handling course =

The handling course is a section of vehicle industry proving grounds which provides the possibility to examine vehicle behaviour, vehicle manoeuvrability, and technical settings under controlled no-traffic circumstances. This track, which typically forms a loop, is often compared to smaller racecourses; it is, however strictly designed for testing. The layout of its environment imitates motorway circumstances.

== Structure ==
In most cases handling courses consist of two parts: low and high speed courses, both enable the same types of tests, only at differing speeds. Handling courses may also be categorised either as wet or dry courses according to the availability of the option for track wetting.

The alternative routes of the handling courses provide diverse track options for the tests. As the course sections have varying radius of curvature, handling courses are suitable for testing all vehicles types. Several types of specially paved shorter sections may also belong to handling courses depending on the given proving ground. These may be curved, straight or even wavy asphalt track sections, furthermore straight or curving sections with varying sideway slopes. Occasionally even degraded surfaces requiring maintenance are built deliberately in order to increase the number of options; furthermore sections suitable for conducting aquaplaning tests may also be inserted. The option of wetting of the latter sections is usually provided by using nozzles. The safety of testing is ensured b the crash spaces designed around the curves.

== Goal and utilization ==
Vehicle behaviour or manoeuvrability refers to the testing of the connection between steering and the running gear, the different assistance appliances (ESP, ABS, ASR), and other systems influencing the dynamics of vehicles. As testing options are unlimited, handling courses are suitable for all situations related to the dynamics of modern vehicles.

== Handling courses of existing proving grounds ==
Currently most proving grounds in Europe feature handling courses. The most well-known examples are the Boxberg Proving Ground constructed by Bosch (Germany) and the Vaitoudden Winter Test Centre in Sweden. A test track featuring a handling course is currently under construction in Zalaegerszeg, Hungary as well.

=== Boxberg Proving Ground, Germany, Boxberg ===
The handling course at the Boxberg Proving Ground consists of two parts. One part is designed for higher speeds suitable for testing all vehicles types thanks to its radius of curvature varying between 48 m and 101 m. The other part is designed with radius of curvature varying between 15 m and 115 m, and has inclinations which increase its difficulty. Several sections of this part are wettable, and it also has a circular surface for drifting. It is not suitable for testing heavy-duty vehicles and buses, but it has a track unit imitating a mountain tunnel, which is suitable for simulating windy circumstances.

=== Vaitoudden Winter Test Centre, Sweden ===
The handling course at the Vaitoudden Winter Test Centre may be divided into two parts, one with snowy surface, the other with frozen. The total length of the snowy surface is 2470 m, its width is approx. 5 m, it contains 13 curves, and due to the snow its grip is medium (μ <0,3). The frozen surface is also divided into two sections. The total length of the first section is approx. 1850 m, its width is approx. 5 m, it contains 8 curves, and the grip of the ice is medium (μ <0,3). The second section is approx. 3000 m long and has the same width as the first section, it contains 30 curves and its grip is also the same as that of the first.

=== ATP Automotive Testing Papenburg GmbH, Germany ===
The handling course at the Papenburg Test Centre is a small scale replica of the racecourse at Hockenheim with a length of 2.6 km and a width of 10 m, and may be divided into two independent units.

=== Zala ZONE Vehicle Industry Test Track, Zalaegerszeg, Hungary ===
The handling course will be a basic component of the test track currently under construction near Zalaegerszeg. The external handling course designed for high speeds will have a total length of 2032 m and a width of 12 m. Its straight sections and curve radius enable reaching a speed of 120 km/h. The 1334 m long and 6 m wide internal handling course will be designed for the same tests at lower speeds of maximum 60 km/h.

Furthermore, the handling course will contain several specially paved section inserts, such as pothole and eroded sections, basalt pavement, straight, curved and wavy pavements, hilly road sections and a section with a 5% sideway slope. A basalt pavement disc will also be built suitable for testing drifting and skidding, as well as a section insert which enables the simulation of sliding on a wet road.
