= Júlio Redecker =

Brazilian politician (1956–2007)

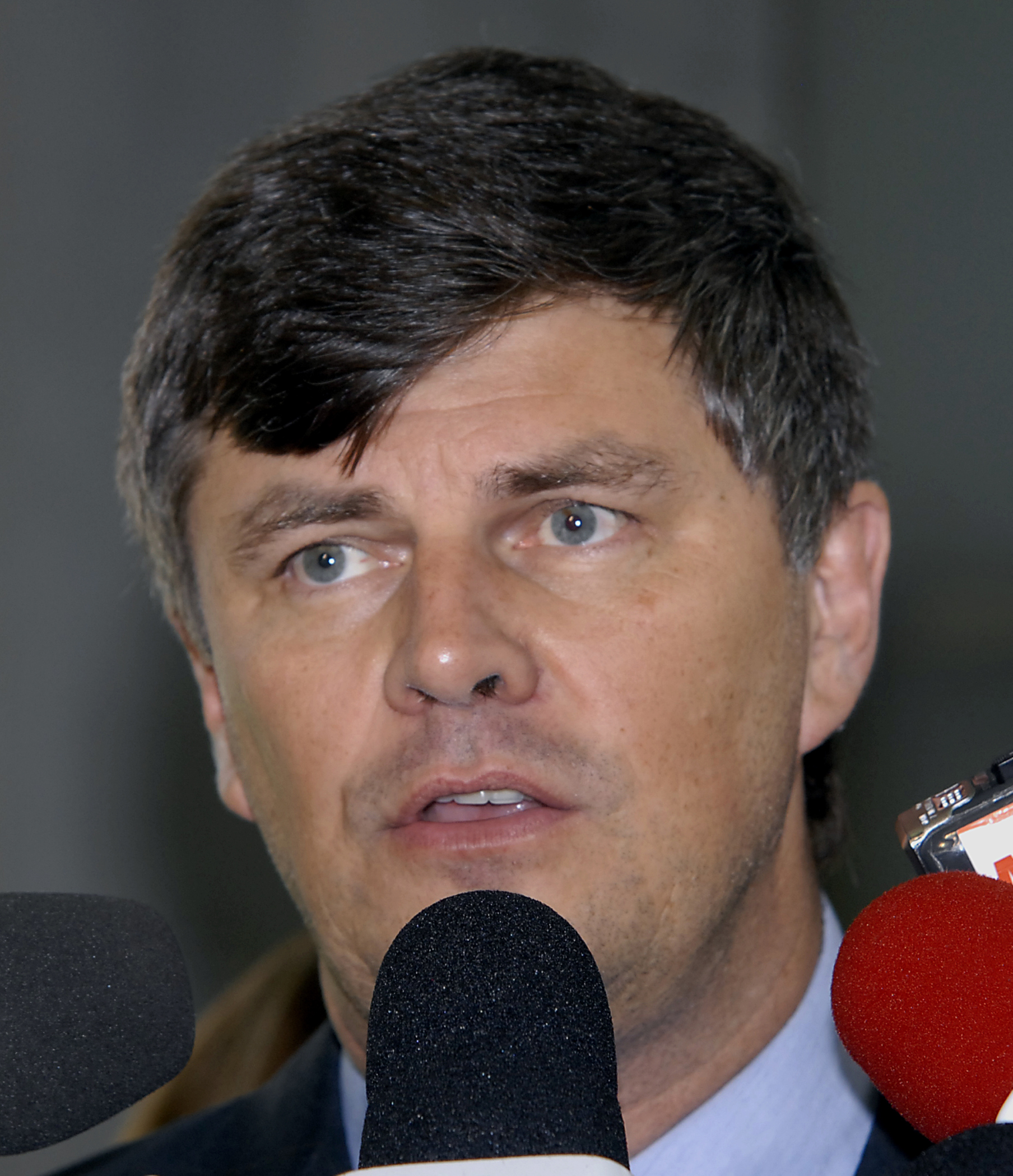

Federal Deputy
- In office 1 February 1995 – 17 July 2007
- Constituency: Rio Grande do Sul

Personal details
- Born: Júlio César Redecker; 12 July 1956 Taquari, Rio Grande do Sul, Brazil
- Died: 17 July 2007 (aged 51) São Paulo, Brazil
- Cause of death: Plane crash
- Resting place: Novo Hamburgo, Rio Grande do Sul, Brazil
- Party: ARENA (1974–1980); PDS (1980–1993); PPR (1993–1995); PPB (1995–2003); PSDB (2003–2007)
- Children: 3, including Lucas
- Education: Pontifical Catholic University of Rio Grande do Sul (LLB)
- Profession: Lawyer, politician

Júlio César Redecker (12 July 1956 – 17 July 2007) was a Brazilian politician and a member of the opposition party, Brazilian Social Democracy Party (PSDB). Redecker was the leader of the minority in the Brazilian Chamber of Deputies. Redecker died aboard TAM Airlines Flight 3054, which crashed during landing in São Paulo on July 17, 2007. He was married and had three children.
