= Scrimmage =

Scrimmage (alteration of skirmish) may refer to:

- A sequence of play in American football; see play from scrimmage
- An exhibition game or practice game
- Scrimmage vest, a garment worn during practices
- USS Scrimmage (AM-297), a U.S. Navy minesweeper built during World War II
- Scholastic Scrimmage, a high school quiz bowl televised in Pennsylvania

== See also ==
- Scrum (rugby)
- Scrim (disambiguation)
