= Scram (disambiguation) =

Scram (or SCRAM) is an emergency shutdown of a nuclear reactor or a complex operation.

Scram or SCRAM may also refer to:

== Arts, entertainment, and media ==
- Scram (video game), a 1981 Atari 8-bit computer game based around shutdown of a nuclear reactor
- Scram Cricket, a variation of the darts game Cricket
- Scram!, a 1932 Laurel and Hardy short film

== People ==
- Scram Jones (born 1977), producer, DJ and emcee

== Technology ==
- SCRAM bracelet, an ankle bracelet for Secure Continuous Remote Alcohol Monitoring
- Salted Challenge Response Authentication Mechanism (or SCRAM), a computer security mechanism used with the Simple Authentication and Security Layer
- Scram cannon, a hypothetical kinetic energy weapon based on ram accelerator technology
- Scramjet, the flow of and combustion of the fuel/air mixture through the engine at supersonic speeds
- Static column RAM (or SCRAM), a type of computer memory

== See also ==
- Scrum (disambiguation)
