= Cross slope =

Geometric feature of pavement surfaces

Cross section of a road. 1. Gutter; 2. Shoulder; 3. Sub-base; 4. Base course; 5. Asphalt

Cross slope, cross fall or camber is a geometric feature of pavement surfaces: the transverse slope with respect to the horizon. It is a very important safety factor. Cross slope is provided to provide a drainage gradient so that water will run off the surface to a drainage system such as a street gutter or ditch. Inadequate cross slope will contribute to aquaplaning. On straight sections of normal two-lane roads, the pavement cross section is usually highest in the center and drains to both sides. In horizontal curves, the cross slope is banked into superelevation to reduce steering effort and lateral force required to go around the curve. All water drains to the inside of the curve. If the cross slope magnitude oscillates within 1–25 metres (3–82 ft), the body and payload of high (heavy) vehicles will experience high roll and lateral vibration.

Cross slope is usually expressed as a percentage:

$$\text{cross slope} = \frac{\text{rise}}{\text{run}} \times 100\%$$.

Cross slope is the angle around a vertical axis between:

- the horizontal line that is perpendicular to the road's center line, and
- the surface.

Typical values range from 2 percent for straight segments to 10 percent for sharp superelevated curves. It may also be expressed as a fraction of an inch in rise over a one-foot run (e.g. 1/4 inch per foot).

Sign convention is most typically positive for cross slope which rises to the right

== See also ==
- Camber angle
- Cant (road/rail)
- Geometric design of roads
