= Scrim (dog) =

Rescue dog who became a symbol of New Orleans in 2024

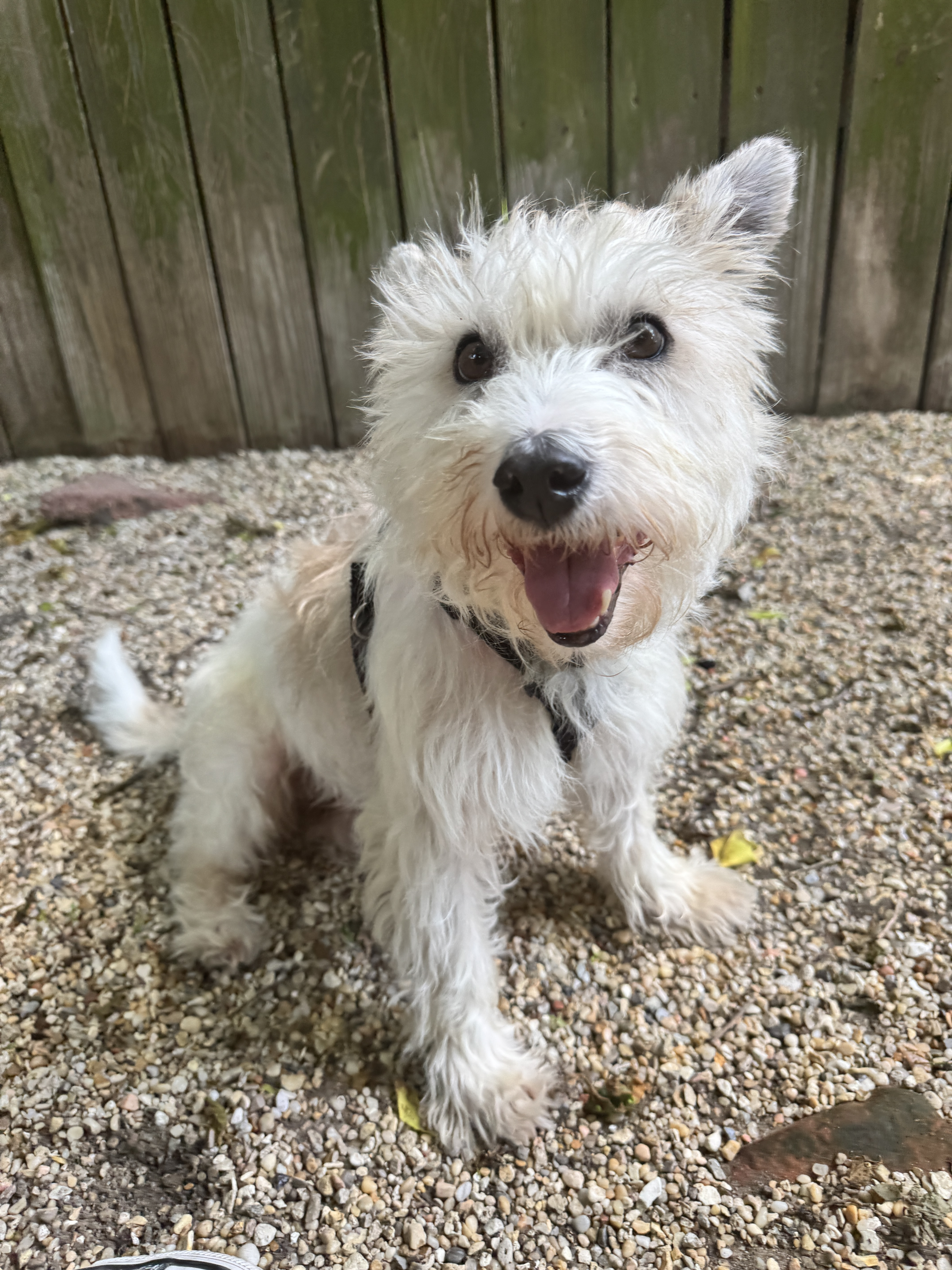
- Scrim, photographed by Michelle Cheramie in April 2025
- Other names: Houndini; Pawdini
- Species: Canis familiaris
- Breed: West Highland Terrier mix
- Sex: Male
- Born: 2022
- zeusrescues.org

Scrim is a wire-haired Westie terrier mutt who was rescued from a New Orleans animal shelter in November 2023. He escaped from two homes and remained at large for nearly a year, surviving bullets, a snowstorm, a heat wave, and a hurricane. A "living, panting embodiment of the spirit of New Orleans," his resilience and ability to elude capture became an international news story.

== History ==
=== Rescue ===
Scrim was found in a trailer park. Classified as a stray, he was slated for euthanasia when he was rescued from the Terrabonne Parish Animal Shelter by Michelle Cheramie, the founding director of Zeus' Rescue. In an Instagram post she wrote: "In my 20+ years of rescue, I rarely met a dog so shut down as Scrim. When he was transferred back to us in November, he was like a hairless stuffed animal and so scared that he would just sit terrified in his kennel. I have no idea what happened to him before he got to us, but it could not have been good."

=== First and second escape, rise to fame, capture and adoption ===
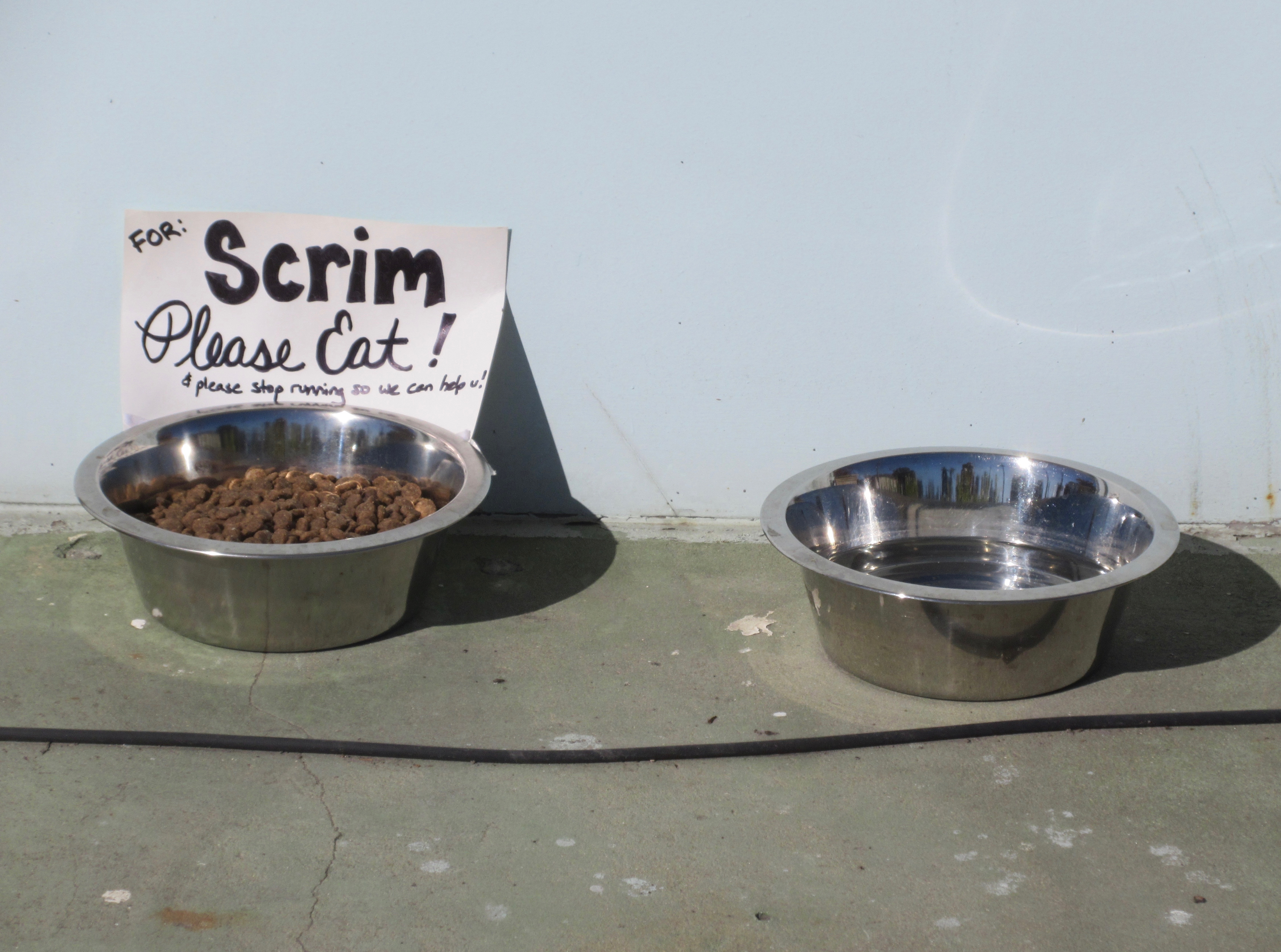
Dog food and water bowls set out "For Scrim", December 2024.

In April 2024, on his first night at a potential adopter's home in Mid-City New Orleans, Scrim escaped. He became a local celebrity as a result of the missing dog posters plastered throughout the neighborhood, and a social media star as people posted cell phone videos of him running through the city. Scrim spottings were tracked on Google Maps, and food for him was left on porches. On October 23, 2024 -- after 177 days on the run -- he was apprehended in a parking lot. Although shot by a tranquilizer gun, he continued to run for nine minutes.

Following his capture, he was treated for injuries including abrasions, embedded projectiles, and missing teeth. He was placed in Cheramie's custody. Three weeks later, he chewed through the screen on a second floor bedroom window, jumped 13 feet, crawled under an iron fence and bolted. Video of Scrim "plunging to the ground, sprinting through a wrought-iron fence and vanishing from view" was widely distributed online. In February 2025, he was captured by volunteers from Trap Dat Cat, a trap, rescue and return non-profit. It was estimated that he traveled 57 square miles (148 square kilometers) while on the lam.

Cheramie decided to adopt Scrim, setting off a custody battle with adopters who were previously selected. It was settled after Cheramie agreed to allow them visitation.

== Recognition ==
Scrim was honored by the New Orleans City Council; a bobblehead was introduced by the National Bobblehead Hall of Fame and Museum; the New Orleans Krewe of Muses had a Scrim-themed float in the Mardi Gras parade, and he was the mascot for a city revitalization project. A "patron saint of the city," he inspired memes, cosplay, tattoos, murals, children's books, and a public art exhibit. "Scrim" became slang for "hastily leaving somewhere without looking back”.
