= Landing performance =

Performance data for landing an aircraft

Landing Performance describes the ability of an aircraft to come to a safe stop on a runway, in particular the distance the aircraft must travel to achieve a full stop after touching down. The performance data for landing an aircraft can be obtained from the aircraft's flight manual or pilot's operating handbook. It will state the distance required to bring the aircraft to a stop under ideal conditions, assuming the aircraft crosses the runway threshold at a height of 50 ft, at the correct speed. The actual landing performance of an aircraft may vary depending on several environmental and mechanical factors at the time of landing.

== Factors affecting landing performance ==
=== Weight ===
The weight of an aircraft is the primary factor that determines the landing distance required by an aircraft. An increase in weight increases the stall speed of the aircraft. Therefore, the landing approach speed increases as the aircraft's weight increases. The kinetic energy (1/2 mV^{2}) that has to be dissipated to stop an aircraft is a function of the mass of the aircraft and the square of its speed at touchdown. The kinetic energy increases significantly as an aircraft's weight increases, and the brakes have to absorb this greater energy, increasing the landing roll of the aircraft.

=== Density altitude ===
An increase in density altitude causes the True Airspeed (TAS) to be higher than the Indicated Airspeed. This increase in TAS leads to a greater touchdown speed and greater kinetic energy. More kinetic energy has to be absorbed by the brakes which necessitates a longer runway.

=== Headwinds and tailwinds ===
The headwind reduces the landing distance for an aircraft. Landing into a headwind reduces the ground speed (GS) for the same indicated airspeed (IAS). This is beneficial to pilots as well as Air traffic controllers (ATC). An aircraft landing into a headwind will require less runway and will be able to vacate the runway sooner.

Tailwind increases the ground speed of an aircraft for the same IAS and thus a longer runway distance will be required for an aircraft to land. Landing with an unknown or unexpected tailwind could lead to the aircraft overshooting the runway.

=== Runway surface ===
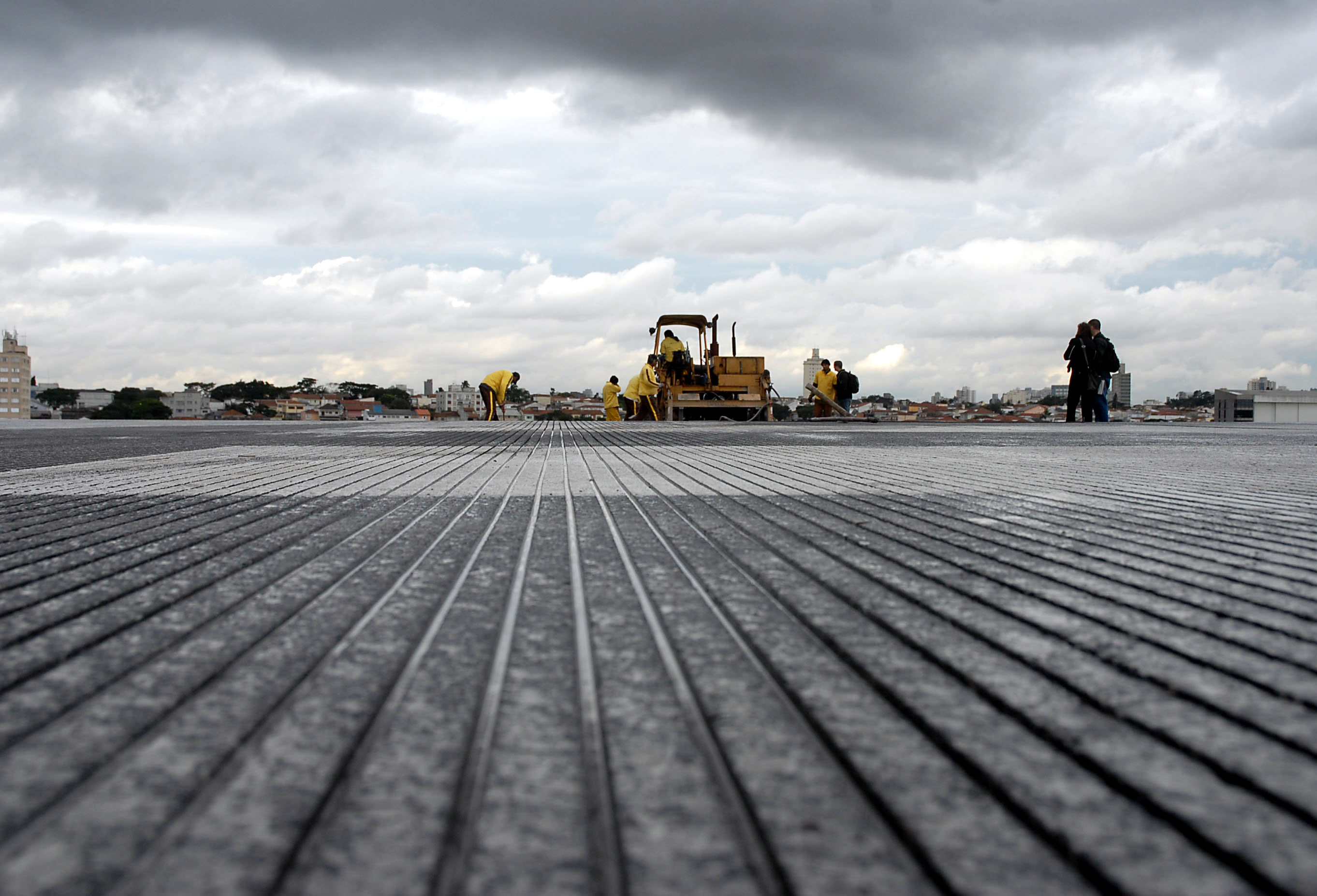
Grooves on a runway increase friction and reduce the risk of hydroplaning.

Runway conditions affect take off and landing performance of an aircraft. The runway may be made up of concrete, asphalt, gravel or grass. An important safety concern at airports is the contamination of the runways due to ice, snow, water, rubber deposits etc. The landing distance required by an aircraft is much more in case of low friction runways which do not facilitate effective braking to occur. Aquaplaning is a phenomenon in which directional control is lost because of the presence of film of water between the rubber tires and the runway surface. The construction of grooved surface runways and regular maintenance, especially rubber removal, both help reduce runway slipperiness and facilitate good ground handling and effective braking.

=== Runway slope ===
An up-slope runway will allow an aircraft to land in a shorter distance. A down-slope runway will require a greater landing distance. It will take longer for the aircraft to touch down from 50 ft above the runway threshold, as the runway is falling away beneath the aircraft. Braking while going downhill is not as effective as on a level or up-slope runway.

=== Flap settings ===
Wing flaps are hinged surfaces on the trailing edge of the wings of a fixed-wing aircraft. High flap settings help an aircraft to increase the aerodynamic drag and reduce the stalling speed so that the aircraft can fly at low speeds safely. Flaps also lower the nose of the aircraft and give the pilots a better view of the ground ahead while landing.

== See also ==
- Density altitude
- Aquaplaning
- Flaps
- Runway
