= Drainage gradient =

Term in road design

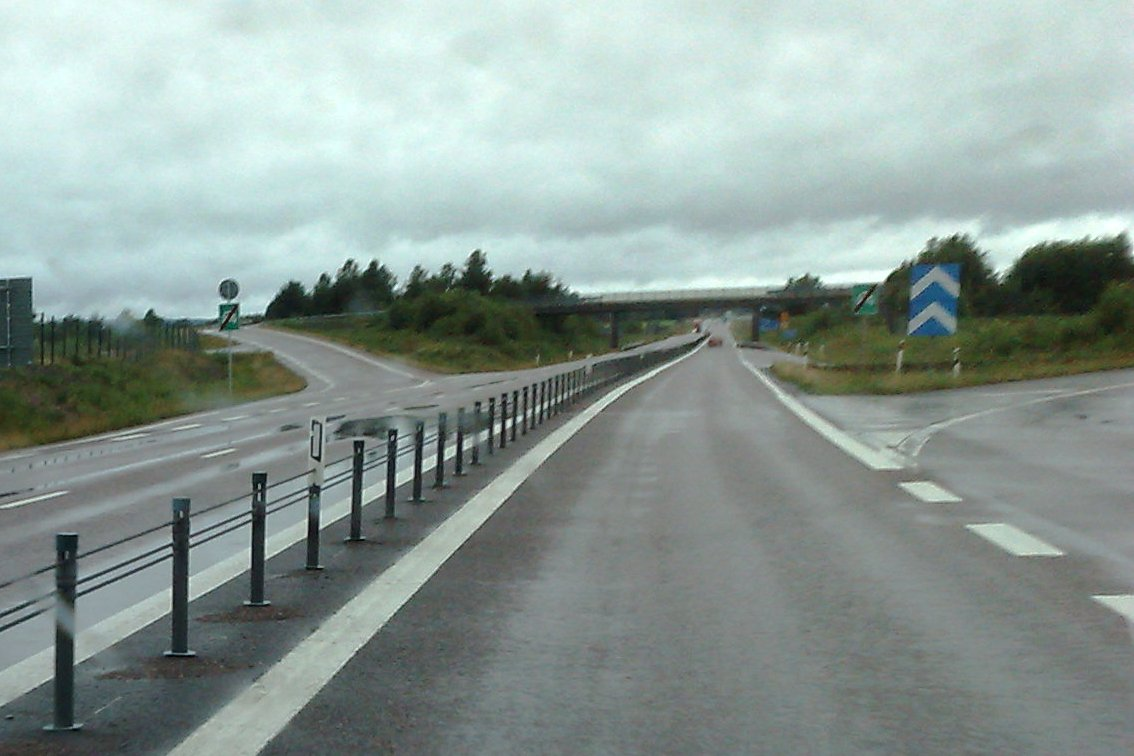
Water pooling at the end of a banked curve, to the left of the median barrier. Also note water collecting in the wheel ruts. (Photo taken in Sweden)

Drainage gradient (DG) is a term in road design, defined as the combined slope due to road surface cross slope (CS) and longitudinal slope (hilliness). Although the term may not be used, the concept is also used in roof design and landscape architecture.

If the drainage gradient is too low, rain and melt water drainage will be insufficient. This results in water pooling on the road surface, thereby increasing the risk for hydroplaning and wet-pavement vehicle crashes.

== Minimum drainage gradient ==
Most road design manuals require drainage gradient to exceed 0.5%, in order to drain water and prevent excessive skid accidents.

One exception to the minimum 0.5% DG limit can be found in the Norwegian road design manual, where the minimum drainage gradient is 2% instead of 0.5%.

== Typical values of drainage gradient ==
Typically on straight road sections, the drainage gradient is at least 1–3% due to the normal cross slope of 1–3%.

In curved sections the drainage gradient is higher, and may often reach 5–12% due to superelevated CS that may reach 5–8% in areas with icy roads and up to 12% in areas without icy roads.

The road's longitudinal slope contributes to a high drainage gradient. However, longitudinal highway slopes steeper than 0.5% are surprisingly rare outside hilly or mountainous areas.

== Effect of insufficient gradient ==
Due to the normal cross slope and the interaction with grade, road sections with insufficient drainage gradient are few and short. Still, they account for an unacceptable number of skid accidents. These hot spots are found at the entrances and exits of banked curves, where the cross slope changes direction in order to create superelevation. As the outside edge of the curve is raised (or superelevated) to create the bank, it passes through a point where the cross slope is absolutely flat. If there is not enough longitudinal grade, water will collect at these spots. This takes place at the beginnings and ends of curves to the left in countries with right hand traffic, and curves to the right in countries with left hand traffic.

A large study in Sweden has shown that the lanes on the outside of the curve (outercurves) average five times more crashes than lanes on the inner side (innercurves). This finding can partially be explained by the entrances and exits of banked outercurves having insufficient DG.

== Minimizing insufficient drainage gradient ==
Roads should be designed so that sections where the cross slope changes direction (and sign) are located where the road is going uphill or downhill. Otherwise there will be a length of pavement with a drainage gradient of less than 0.5%, resulting in unacceptable skid accident risk.

When designing road curves in a flat landscape, it may be necessary to design long wave undulations on purpose. These "synthetic" longitudinal gradients can then be used to reach a sufficient drainage gradient in sections where the cross slope is close to zero.

Another option to minimize crash risk due to low DG at the entrance or exit of banked outercurves is to move the superelevation further from the curve and out to a straight road section. This results in a banked straight lane. This design can yield another risk, since the water film (when raining) on an adjacent lane may become thicker. However, this is on a straight section where the lack of road curvature minimizes the lateral forces and thus keeps the skid risk low.

Another option within the superelevation transition section is to increase the cross slope "tilt rate" within the zone where the cross slope is between −0.5 to +0.5%.

== Maintenance ==
As roads are worn down by tire wear, wheelpath rutting often interrupts the DG, and water will collect in the wheelpaths. This is more prevalent on asphalt pavement, but concrete pavements are not immune. Before wet pavement crashes reach unacceptable levels, maintenance actions such as resurfacing or diamond grinding should be taken, even if other pavement distress such as cracking is still low.

== Other resources ==
- NCHRP Web Doc 16 Improved Surface Drainage of Pavements: Final Report
