= SCRIM =

Road survey machine

SCRIM (Sideway-force Coefficient Routine Investigation Machine) is a machine, originally developed by TRL Limited in the United Kingdom, used to measure the wet skidding resistance of a road surface.

W.D.M. Limited and ARRB Systems Pty Ltd (iSAVe) manufacture sideways-force coefficient routine investigation apparatus for measuring wet road skid resistance. Newer devices such as the iSAVe (intelligent Safety Assessment Vehicle) incorporate dual-wheel path measurement and collection of ancillary data such as road geometry, texture, IRI and rutting to highlight areas of major safety concern.

The SCRIM machine has a daily survey capacity of 200 to 300 km, depending on road type. A SCRIM survey in the UK can be undertaken at two different target test speeds of 50 and 80 km/h. The permitted speed range covering these target speeds is 25 to 85 km/h. Skidding resistance data recorded at speeds within this range can be speed-corrected to give equivalent values at 50 km/h.

Besides being the main equipment used for friction testing in the UK, it is also used in many other countries, including Spain, Italy, France, Belgium, New Zealand, Australia, Chile and Argentina.

Currently standards are being prepared by the ASTM for continuous friction measurement devices in the USA, including the development of a conforming tire.

The SKM is a similar device to the SCRIM. It also operates on the sideway-force principle, and is the main equipment used for friction-testing throughout Germany and the Netherlands.

Other friction testing devices include the Pavement Friction Tester, devices by Norsemeter, ViaTech, and the Griptester; all these devices have their own benefits.
