= Airfield rubber removal =

Removal of tire buildup from airport runways

Airfield rubber removal, also known as runway rubber removal, is the use of high pressure water, abrasives, chemicals and other mechanical means to remove the rubber from tires that builds up on airport runways. In the United States, the Federal Aviation Administration (FAA) specifies friction levels for safe operation of planes and measures friction coefficients for the evaluation of appropriate friction levels. Individual airports incorporate rubber removal into their maintenance schedules based on the number of takeoffs and landings that each airport experiences.

== Source of rubber buildup ==
When a plane lands, the tires are not spinning. The time it takes for the tires to get up to speed is referred to as "spin up time" (Speidel, 2002). During this time the tires are effectively dragging on the runway as well as being put under pressure by the weight of the airplane. This can be seen in the slight puff of smoke that comes from a landing aircraft's tires as they first touch the runway surface. The friction built up causes the rubber to polymerize and harden to the runway surface.

== Effects of rubber buildup ==
The buildup of rubber affects the level of friction of the runway, most noticeably as a reduction in braking and ground handling performance. This can lead to incidents such as runway overrun or a lateral slide off the runway.

The contributing factors for viscous hydroplaning are a damp or wet pavement, medium to high speed, poor pavement texture, and worn tire tread. If a runway has good microtexture and grooving and the aircraft tires have a good tread design, viscous hydroplaning could be alleviated.(NTSB, p.92)

Macrotexture is visible to the naked eye. Without the aid of a microscope, microtexture can only be felt. The buildup of rubber directly affects these variables and therefore reduces the friction available for landing which increase the possibility of hydroplaning of the landing airplane.

== Methods ==
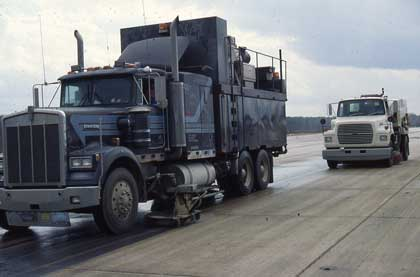
Runway rubber removal using ultrahigh pressure water

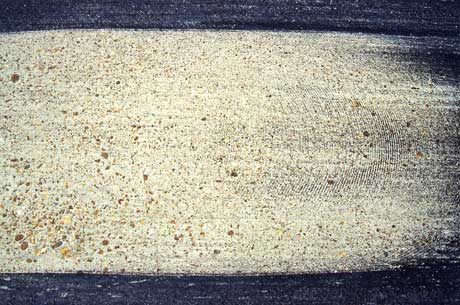
Rubber removal before and after shot using ultrahigh pressure water

=== High pressure water and ultra high pressure water ===
Sometimes referred to as hydrocleaning, high pressure and ultra high pressure work on the same principle of applying a spinning jet or set of jets to the surface to break the hardened rubber free from the runway surface. The main difference between the two is the pressure and flow. High pressure removal uses water at 2,000–15,000 psi (14,000–103,000 kPa) at up to 30 US gallons per minute (1.9 L/s) while ultra high pressure removal uses up to 40,000 psi (280,000 kPa) with a water usage between 6 and 16 US gallons per minute (0.38 and 1.01 L/s) (Speidel, 2002, p. 4). High pressure and ultra high pressure water operations rely on the impact of water alone, with no other chemicals used. High pressure and ultra high pressure water operations are known for destroying the integrity of the airfield and break down the surface of the runway after multiple uses.

=== Chemical removal ===
Cleaning the runway using chemicals involves the application of proprietary cleaners that are brushed into the surface of the runway and then washed off using low pressure water. There is a time between applying the chemicals and washing the runway when the chemicals are allowed to react with and break down the rubber. During this time the runway is unusable for landing operations and therefore could not be used safely in an emergency situation. The chemicals used can be expensive and require special handling.

=== High velocity impact removal ===
This method employs the principle of throwing abrasive particles at a very high velocity at the runway pavement surface, thus blasting the contaminants from the surface (Speidel, 2002). Also known as sandblasting, this method can introduce foreign object debris to the runway if not contained and cleaned up properly.

=== Mechanical removal ===
This type of removal involves the milling of the first 1/8–3/16 inch (3–5 mm) off the runway surface.
