= Joe Sharkey =

American author (1946–2023)

- Born: October 15, 1946; Philadelphia, Pennsylvania, U.S.
- Died: November 6, 2023 (aged 77); Tucson, Arizona, U.S.
- Occupations: Author; columnist
- Spouses: Carolynne White (div. 1982); Nancy J. Albaugh (m. 1985)
- Children: 3
- Writing career
- Subjects: Business travel; crime

Joseph Michael Sharkey (October 15, 1946 – November 6, 2023) was an American author and columnist. His columns focused mostly on business travel, while his non-fiction books focused on criminality; he also co-authored a novel. He wrote for The New York Times from 1996 to 2015. Before then, he was an Assistant National Editor for The Wall Street Journal, the City Editor for the Albany Times-Union, and a columnist for The Philadelphia Inquirer.

== Personal life ==
Joseph Michael Sharkey was born in Philadelphia on October 15, 1946. He enrolled at Pennsylvania State University, but did not graduate, and instead joined the U.S. Navy. While there, he wrote for the Navy News Service during the Vietnam War.

Sharkey was married to Carolynne White; they had three children and divorced in 1982. Three years later, he married editor Nancy J. Albaugh.

On November 6, 2023, Sharkey died from a stroke, caused by hypertension, at his home in Tucson, Arizona. He was 77.

== Books ==
Sharkey's 1994 book Bedlam: Greed, Profiteering, and Fraud in a Mental Health System Gone Crazy is an investigation of the psychiatric industry. Focusing on sensational cases in the United States, Sharkey exposed how powerful elements within the industry maneuvered to exploit new markets when health insurance providers began covering costs for in-hospital mental health treatment. He traced soaring mental health costs to the often criminal marketing practices of biological psychiatry, which Sharkey asserted began when the number of psychiatric hospitals boomed in the late 1980s. He provided anecdotal tales of people coerced into treatment on fabricated pretenses, and compared schemes to fill beds at for-profit mental and addiction facilities, which were offering bounties to clergy, teachers, police and "crisis counselors," to the business plan of the Holiday Inn hotel chain.

The psychiatric industry, warned Sharkey — whose late father-in-law was a respected psychiatrist involved in setting up non-profit mental health clinics during the 1980s in New York state and whose daughter is a researcher, professor, and licensed clinical social worker — has been lobbying legislatures for an increasing share of government health spending. Despite such warnings by Sharkey and mental health watchdogs, similar practices have continued to evolve in Texas (where many of the events depicted in Bedlam took place), in the form of the Texas Medication Algorithm Project, and at the federal level with the President's New Freedom Commission on Mental Health.

Another of Sharkey's books is Above Suspicion, the nonfiction story of FBI agent Mark Putnam, who murdered his mistress in an eastern Kentucky mining town. In the book, Sharkey implicitly condemned the FBI for encouraging the use of paid informants. A movie adaptation called Above Suspicion, starring Emilia Clarke and Jack Huston and directed by Phillip Noyce, was released in 2019.

Sharkey's book, Deadly Greed, which has been optioned for a feature film, explored the sensational 1989 Boston killing, in which Charles Stuart fatally shot his pregnant wife Carol and caused racial tensions by accusing a black man of the crime.

Sharkey also co-authored a novel, Lady Gold, with former New York Police Department detective Angela Amato. The movie rights for the book were purchased by Paramount Pictures, and an adaptation was in development by Mel Gibson's production company, Icon.

== Aircraft accident ==
Joe Sharkey was one of seven people aboard an Embraer Legacy business jet that collided in mid-air with a Gol Airlines Boeing 737 over Brazil, on September 29, 2006. The business jet, despite sustaining damage to its wing and tail, managed to land safely at Cachimbo military airport, while the Boeing crashed to the ground, killing all 154 people on board. The Legacy jet was owned and operated by ExcelAire, a charter company headquartered in Ronkonkoma, New York, and was on its delivery flight from Embraer's factory in São José dos Campos, near São Paulo, to the United States. Sharkey was on a freelance assignment in Brazil for Business Jet Traveler, a magazine specialized in corporate aviation. In a New York Times front-page article titled "Colliding With Death at 37,000 Feet, and Living", published October 3, 2006, Sharkey reported:

And it had been a nice ride. Minutes before we were hit, I had wandered up to the cockpit to chat with the pilots, who said the plane was flying beautifully. I saw the readout that showed our altitude: 37,000 feet. I returned to my seat. Minutes later came the strike (it sheared off part of the plane’s tail, too, we later learned).

During an interview with NBC's Today Show on October 5, 2006, Sharkey said he was relaxing in his cabin seat with the window shade down when he was jolted by a bang. "It was more like a car that hits a pothole rather than 'boom!'" he said. The plane steadied itself and it became silent again. It was only when Sharkey opened the shade and looked out his window that he noticed something was wrong. "My heart just sank because I looked at the wing tip and I saw that it was shorn off," he told Today host Matt Lauer. "Basically four feet of the wingtip, the part that curves up, the winglet, gone... I’ve flown a lot, and I’m thinking, 'This is definitely, definitely not good.'"

The pilots, Joseph Lepore and Jan Paladino, were composed and focused, like "infantrymen who were well trained." Still, Sharkey and the other passengers, despite an uneasy calm, grew concerned. "It was very serene," Sharkey said. "At first it was just quiet and grimly concern." An engineer on board noticed the damaged wing was starting to peel, and Sharkey said it was then that everyone on board started to think about dying. "That’s the point in which it was clear that one way or another we were going down in unpleasant circumstances, and probably, since we couldn’t find a runway, we were going to ditch."

Sharkey scribbled a quick note to his wife, "I expressed my love, my appreciation and the fact that I accepted death." He put the note in his wallet, thinking it might eventually be found. "And then I thought… it was almost bizarre … Is this going to hurt? And how badly is it going to hurt?" The pilots eventually spotted a remote military airstrip and safely put the plane down. Sharkey said that when he found out, several hours later, that the Legacy jet hit a commercial airliner, he thought, "We should not be the ones walking away from this." Asked, at the end of the interview, about the pilots who saved his life, he said, "I think we need to be careful about how the evidence is evaluated, because I think these guys are in some peril."

On his blog, "Joe Sharkey at Large", Sharkey wrote about his experience and of being held for 36 hours for interrogation after the forced landing, his views on the ongoing investigation, and the public response against him and others aboard the Legacy jet. In response to Sharkey's questioning of Brazil's air traffic control infrastructure, Waldir Pires, the Brazilian defense minister stated:

"I cannot anticipate testimony that may be given, for example, by this [Joe Sharkey] in the United States. It is evident, it seems to me that his personality is a little frivolous, because with the number [of accidents] we have and the statements he makes, it [Sharkey's statement] is something absolutely inadequate."

Pires was later fired for his handling of the 2006–2007 Brazilian aviation crisis.

In 2008, Sharkey was sued in a Brazilian court for an article he wrote in The New York Times. The widow of one of the victims claimed the article, in which Sharkey blamed the crash on incapable air operators, defamed the Brazilian people and consequently her personal dignity.

== Books ==
- 1990 (reprint date) Death Sentence: The Inside Story of the John List Murders
- 1991 Deadly Greed: The Riveting True Story of the Stuart Murder Case that Rocked Boston and Shocked the Nation
- 1993 Above Suspicion
- 1994 Bedlam: Greed, Profiteering, and Fraud in a Mental Health System Gone Crazy
- 1998 Lady Gold (with Angela Amato)
