= 2006–2007 Brazilian aviation crisis =

Civil aviation crisis

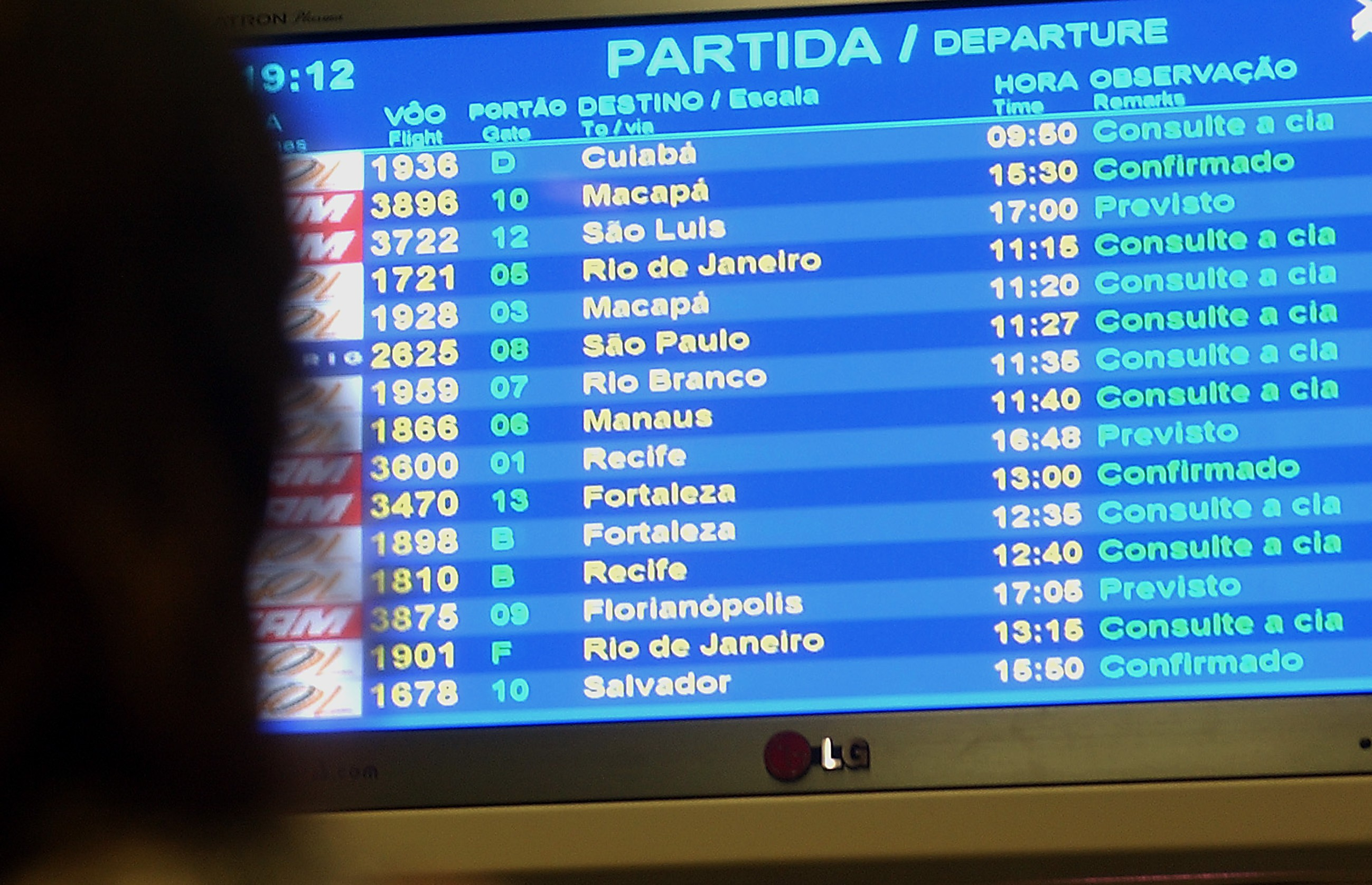
FIDS at Brasília's Juscelino Kubitschek International Airport showing delayed flights following an equipment failure at CINDACTA-I

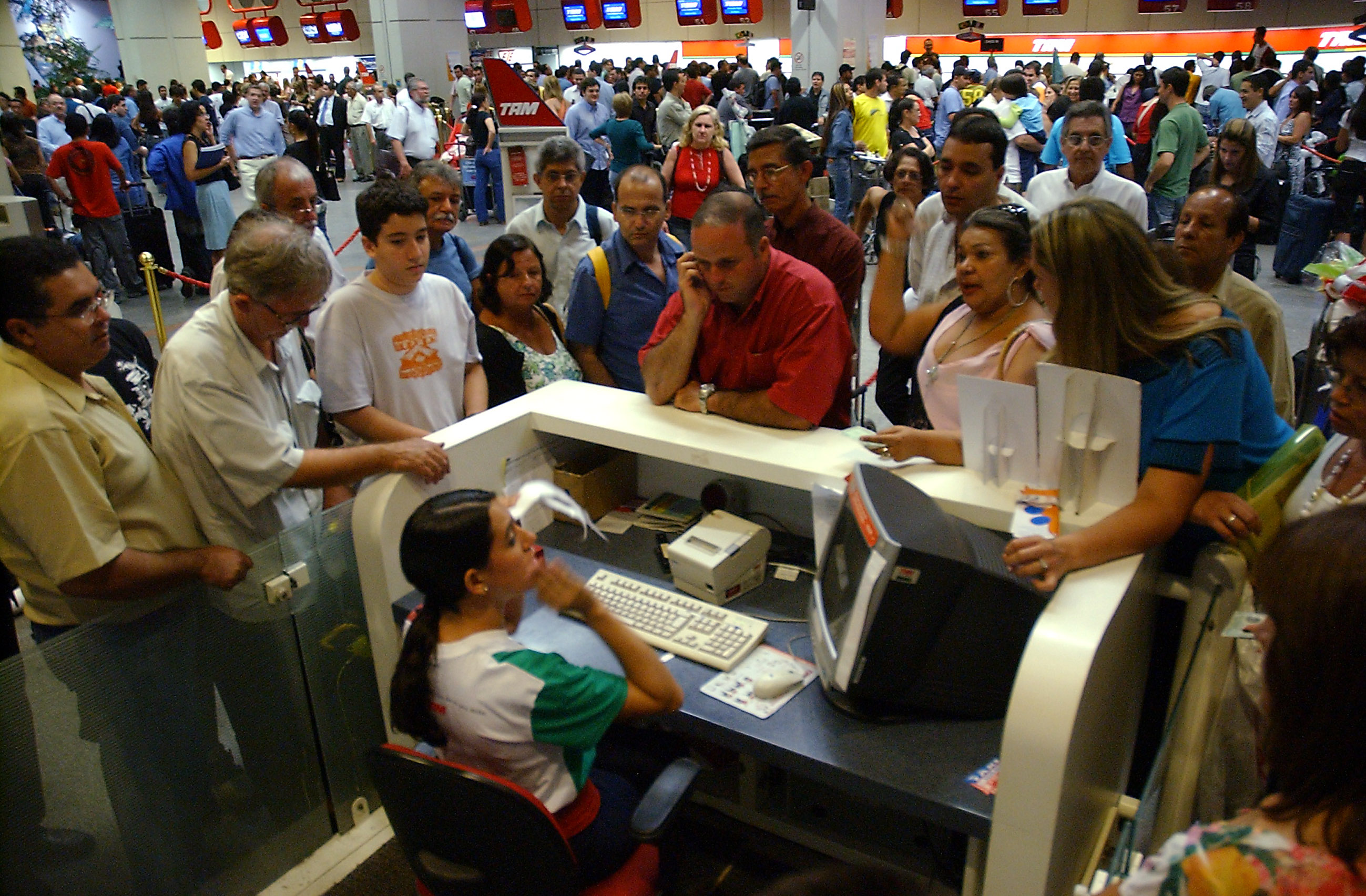
Passengers at Brasília International Airport inquiring about delayed flights

Between 2006 and 2007, Brazil's civil aviation sector suffered a crisis characterized by significant flight delays and cancellations, air traffic controller strikes and safety concerns about the country's airport and air traffic infrastructure. It ostensibly started after the crash of Gol Transportes Aéreos Flight 1907 in September 2006, and extended to January 2008. While the government announced a series of measures aimed at mitigating its effects, no clear solution has been found. In Brazil the crisis has been dubbed "Apagão Aéreo" ("Aerial Blackout"), an allusion to an energy crisis which Brazil experienced between 2001 and 2002.

== Brazil's air traffic control system ==
Brazil's air traffic control system is run by the Brazilian Air Force (FAB). While some approach controls and control towers may have civilian controllers, the vast majority are military non-commissioned officers supervised by commissioned officers (with the totality of ARTCCs being staffed by the military, under the Department of Airspace Control (DECEA, Portuguese: Departamento de Controle de Espaço Aéreo).

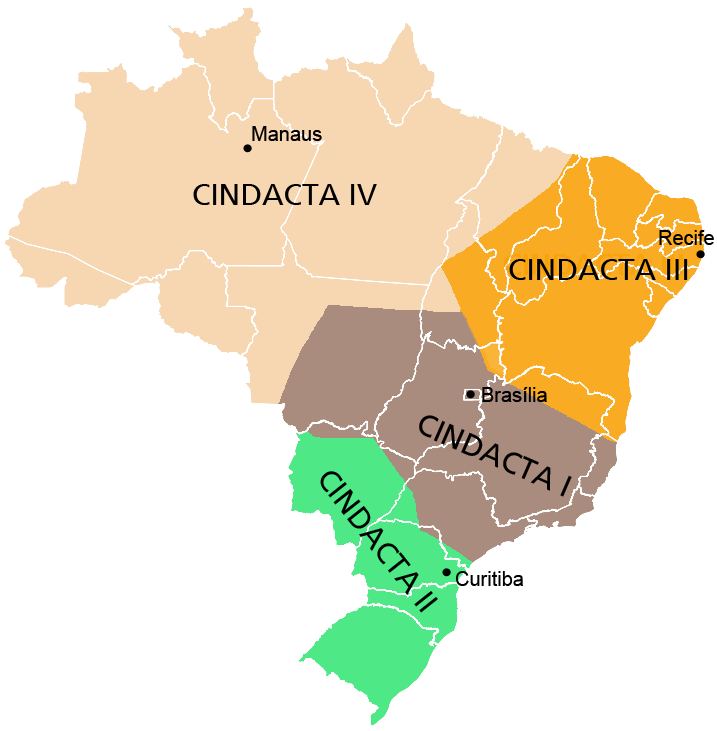
Approximate areas covered by CINDACTA's four air-control regions.

The air traffic control centers are known as Integrated Air Traffic Control and Air Defense Centers (CINDACTA, Portuguese: Centro Integrado de Defesa Aérea e Controle de Tráfego Aéreo). Four CINDACTAs are in operation, located in four different cities and each responsible for different regions of Brazil's airspace.

The use of military air traffic controllers for civilian traffic is not unusual, but has been deprecated in most developed countries. In the US, the Federal Aviation Administration (FAA) operates a wholly parallel system with that of the US Air Force and NORAD. This is also the case of Eurocontrol and each of its member nations' air defense systems. Brazil's use of an integrated command poses some unique challenges to the government. As members of the military, controllers are not allowed to form unions (such as the case of NATCA in the US) or to strike.

While the air traffic control system saw significant improvement with the implementation of the Amazon Surveillance System (SIVAM) in the northern portion of the country, there were many warning signs that the system as a whole was heading towards an untenable situation. In 2003, the Brazilian Air Force warned of the need for upgraded equipment and additional funding. For three years, budget requests submitted by DECEA, the Air Force department in charge of air traffic control, were denied. The Tribunal de Contas da União (TCU), Brazil's supreme audit institution, issued a report after the crisis which echoed the FAB's concerns, stating that a lack of planning and underfunding of the air traffic control system by the federal government was to blame for the crisis.

== Gol Transportes Aéreos Flight 1907 ==
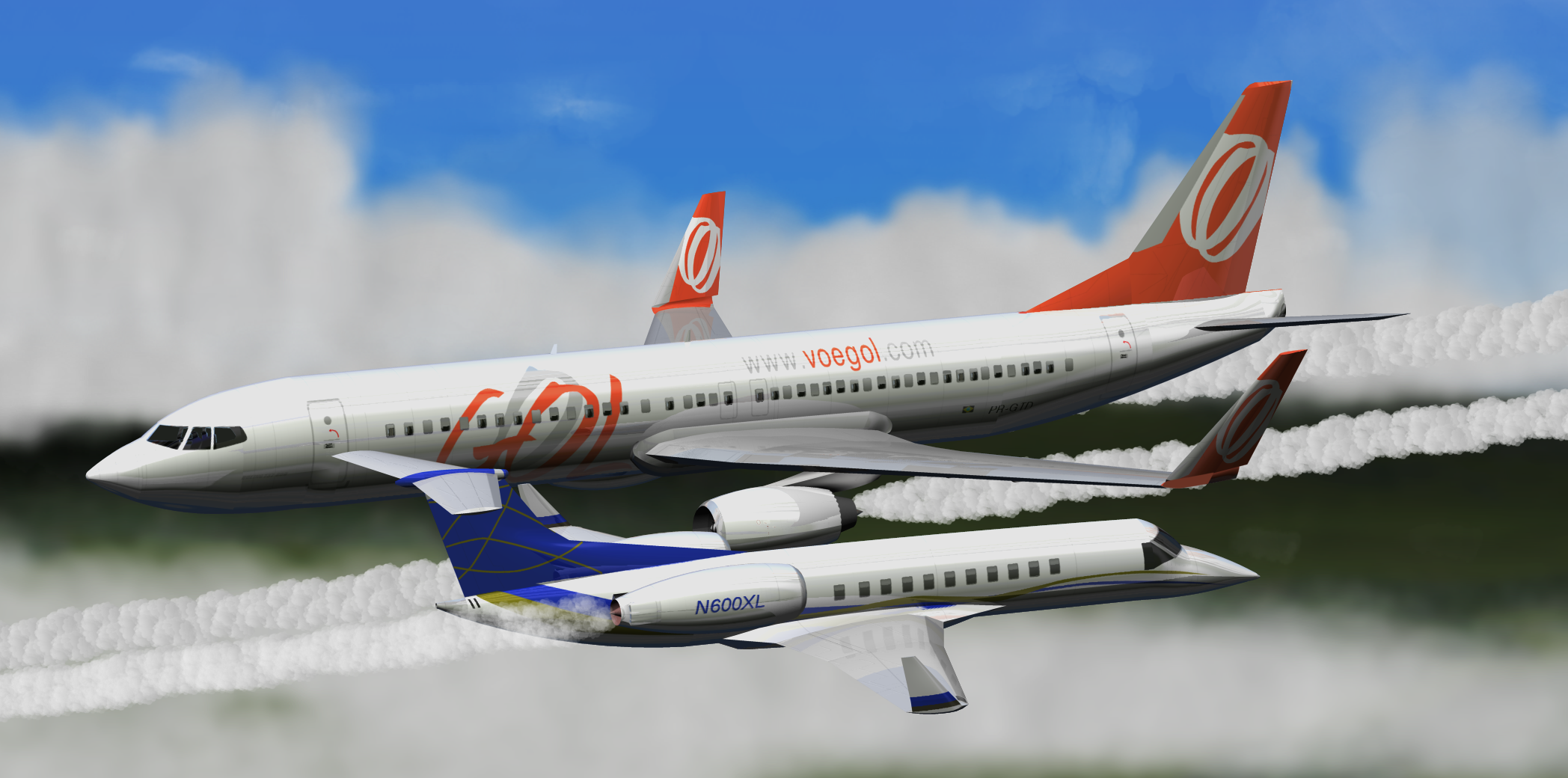
Artist's rendition of the moment the collision occurred

On September 29, 2006, a Gol Transportes Aéreos Boeing 737-800 collided with an ExcelAire Embraer Legacy 600 over the state of Mato Grosso, leading to the loss of 154 lives in what was, at the time, the deadliest air disaster in Brazilian history.

Investigations concluded that the air traffic controllers had made multiple errors, resulting in the two airplanes being directed to operate in opposite directions on the same airway. Further, the Legacy aircraft's transponder was found to have been off from 54 minutes before the time of the collision until three minutes after, when the crew turned it on again, thereby disabling the collision avoidance system on both aircraft. Footage of the radar screens at the time of the incident reveals that the primary radar lost contact with the Legacy 28 minutes after Legacy's transponder was off.

Following this accident, many technology and personnel issues were made public, pointing to the poor situation of Brazilian aviation's infrastructure and transforming the crash into a catalyst for the crisis. Facing the possibility of being blamed for an accident which—in their opinion—could have been avoided by appropriate corrective measures, the air traffic controllers decided to take protest action.

== Air traffic control chaos ==
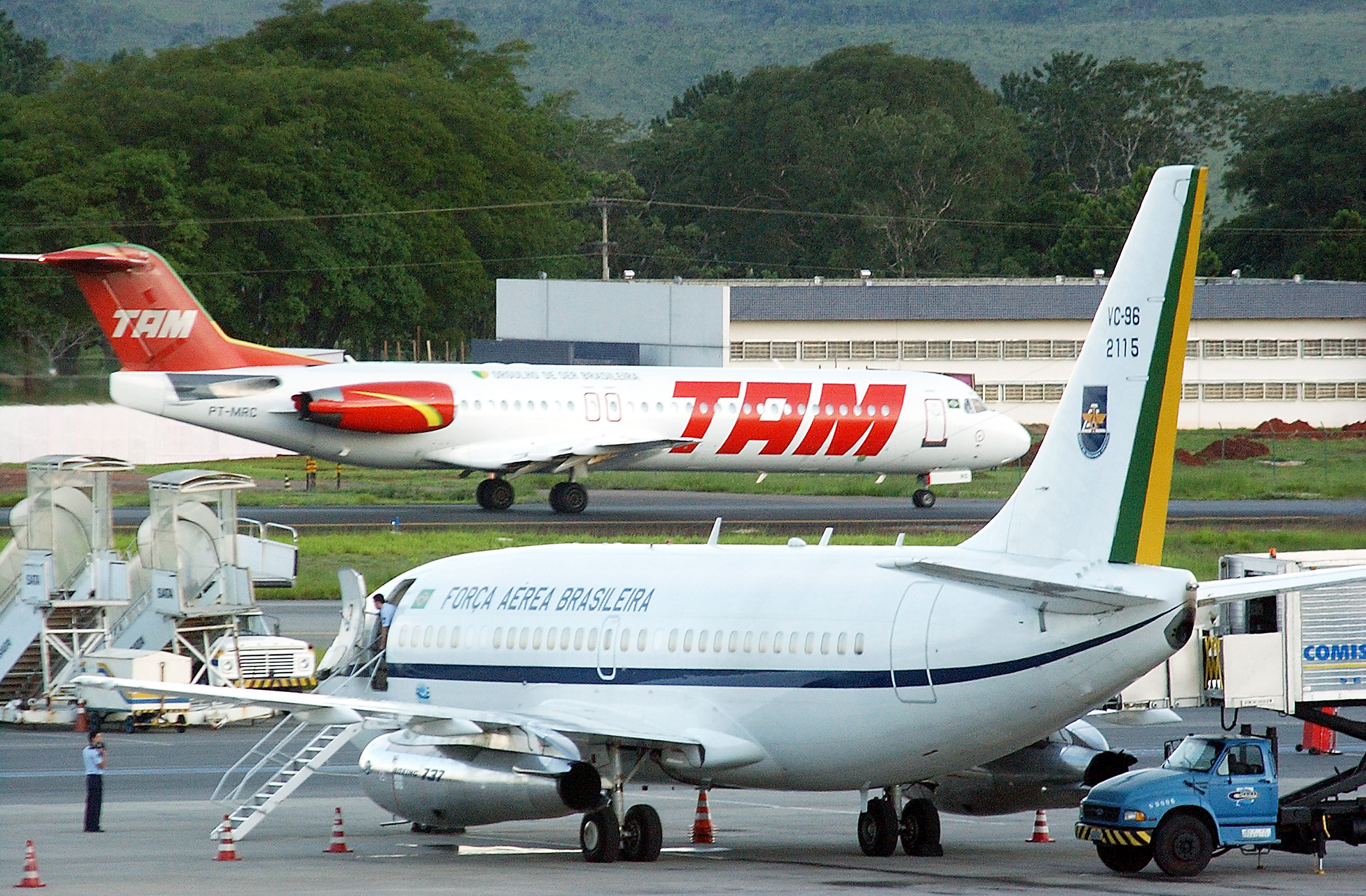
A Brazilian Air Force 737-200, often used by the Brazilian President on domestic trips, pressed into service for TAM flights during the crisis.

Following the Gol incident, the situation deteriorated rapidly, with controllers commencing a work-to-rule protest which culminated in massive flight delays and protests from passengers and airlines alike. The apex of the crisis occurred in December 2006. Due to a combination of equipment failures, understaffed ATC and the holiday travel season, travel at many Brazilian airports stopped altogether for some days. With the airlines unable to clear the backlog of passengers due to the canceled flights, and under pressure to solve the crisis from the general public, the government pressed into service several Brazilian Air Force jets, including one of the president's own planes.

International organizations joined the protest by complaining of the work conditions experienced by the Brazilian air traffic controllers, citing long hours and low pay. At the same time, two different congressional inquiries were established to look into the matter. The executive branch's own inter-ministerial work-group concluded that the issue could be partly solved by both demilitarizing the air traffic control system and reinvesting the user fees and taxes levied on aviation back into the national air traffic control system.

On March 30, 2007, nearly 100 controllers walked out to protest their working conditions. The walkout occurred soon after President Luiz Inácio Lula da Silva left the country for a summit with US president George W. Bush. Lula was reported to have said he felt as if he had been "backstabbed".

On July 21, 2007, a short-circuit at a communications relay shut down CINDACTA-4 for over three hours (from 23:15 to 02:30). While this incident was relatively short-lived, its consequences were emblematic of the crisis as a whole: 45% of the following day's flights suffered delays or cancellations.

== TAM Airlines Flight 3054 ==
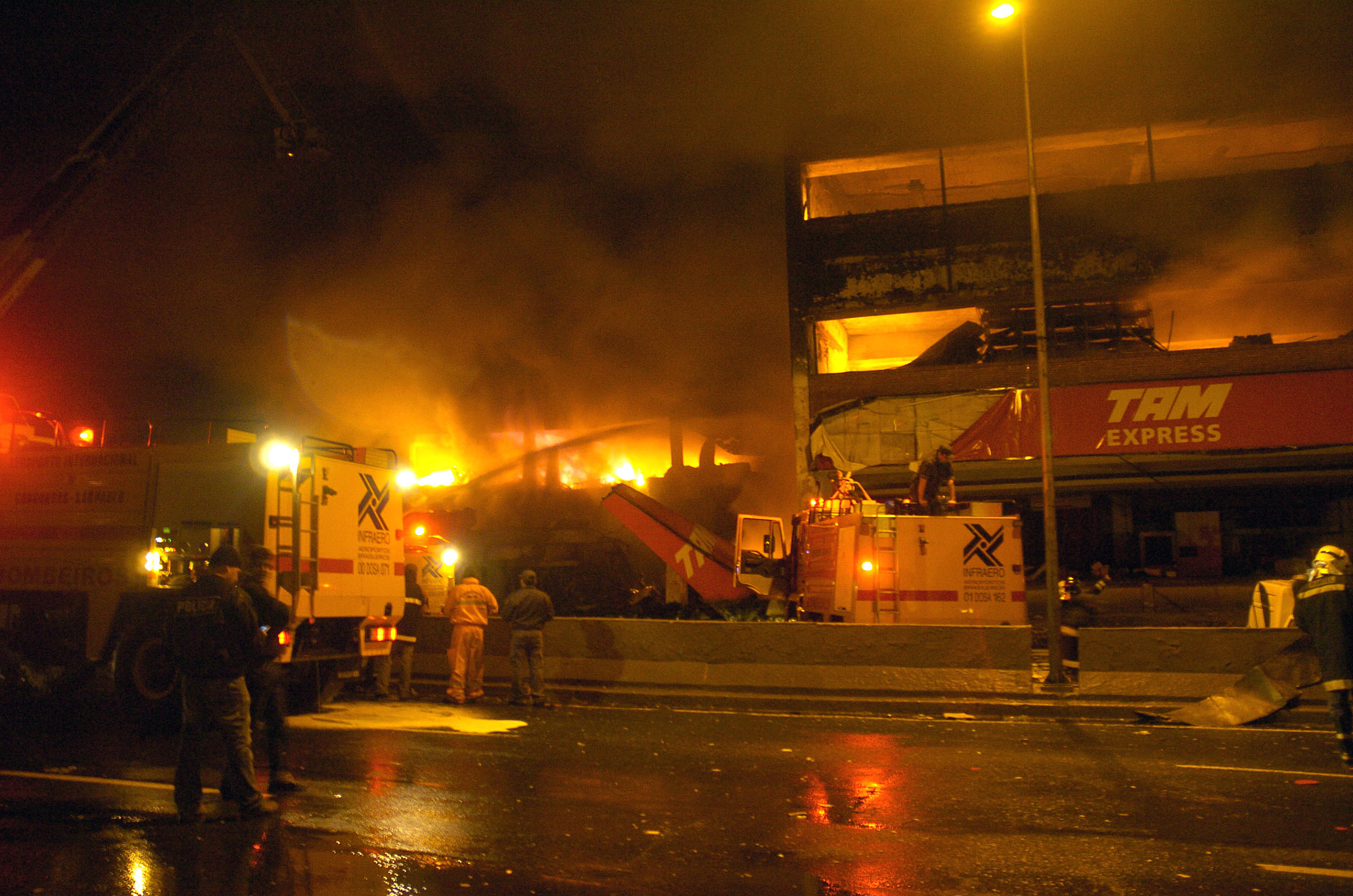
The aftermath of Flight 3054

On July 17, 2007, a fully loaded TAM Airlines Airbus A320 aircraft ran off a runway at Congonhas-São Paulo International Airport, and crashed into a nearby warehouse, resulting in 199 fatalities. The Brazilian press was quick to add this to a growing list of civil aviation woes, and pressed the government for changes. In September 2009, more than two years after the accident, CENIPA announced the result of official investigations. The report said that one of the thrust levers, which control the airliner's engines, was in a power-on position when it should have been in idle, but it was not proved if there was mechanical or human failure as the cause of the accident. In addition to the positions of the thrust levers, the report listed several factors that may have contributed to the accident, as a high volume of rain on the day, with the formation of puddles on the runway, and the absence of grooving. The report does not blame the length of the runway as a factor in the accident.

== Administration reaction ==
The administration's reaction began with an internal conflict between the military and civilian leadership on whether to negotiate with the air traffic controllers. Given their military position, they were not entitled to negotiate or press grievances outside their chain of command. The civilian government pressed for a pragmatic approach, while the military, with a view to guarding discipline, took a more hardline view. While the civilian government initially negotiated with the controllers, in June 2007, Lula's government sacked 14 military controllers and arrested 2 others for mutiny.

With the public, the administration has been heavily criticized for sometimes insensitive comments. On June 9, 2007, asked by reporters what passengers should do while waiting for the delayed flights, the Minister of Tourism, Marta Suplicy, replied "relaxa e goza" ("relax and enjoy it"), a popular sexual expression relating to a supposedly advisable behavior for victims of rape, which can also mean "not to care". Marta apologized officially on the same day, expressing regret over an "unfortunate" comment.

Three weeks later, Finance Minister Guido Mantega tried to minimize the crisis, saying that the crisis was the price of prosperity. He said that he believed the crisis was due to the "increase in the flow of traffic due to the country's prosperity."

In July 2007, after the TAM Flight 3054 crash, a Rede Globo story reported that the airplane's right thrust reverser was inoperative at the time of the crash. A camera set up by Globo caught a top presidential adviser, Marco Aurélio Garcia, inside the Palácio do Planalto, apparently celebrating with an aide immediately after watching the newscast, ostensibly due to the blame placed on the federal administration's policies for the crash. The gestures, which were colloquially understood as being obscene, were widely condemned in the media. Relatives of those who died in the crash asked for their resignation.

Ten months after the beginning of the crisis, in July 2007, President Lula made a statement on national TV, in which he acknowledged the existence of a crisis, and while he did not offer specific measures to improve the air traffic control system, he did commit the administration to solving some of the criticisms levied on Congonhas Airport. During the following week, the President fired the Minister of Defense, Waldir Pires. The new minister appointed to replace him was former Supreme Federal Tribunal president Nelson Jobim. President Lula vowed to improve Brazil's ATC system.

== See also ==
- Aviation safety
- Gol Transportes Aéreos Flight 1907
- List of accidents and incidents involving commercial aircraft
- List of the busiest airports in Brazil
- TAM Airlines Flight 3054
