= Gol Transportes Aéreos Flight 1907 =

2006 mid-air collision over Brazil

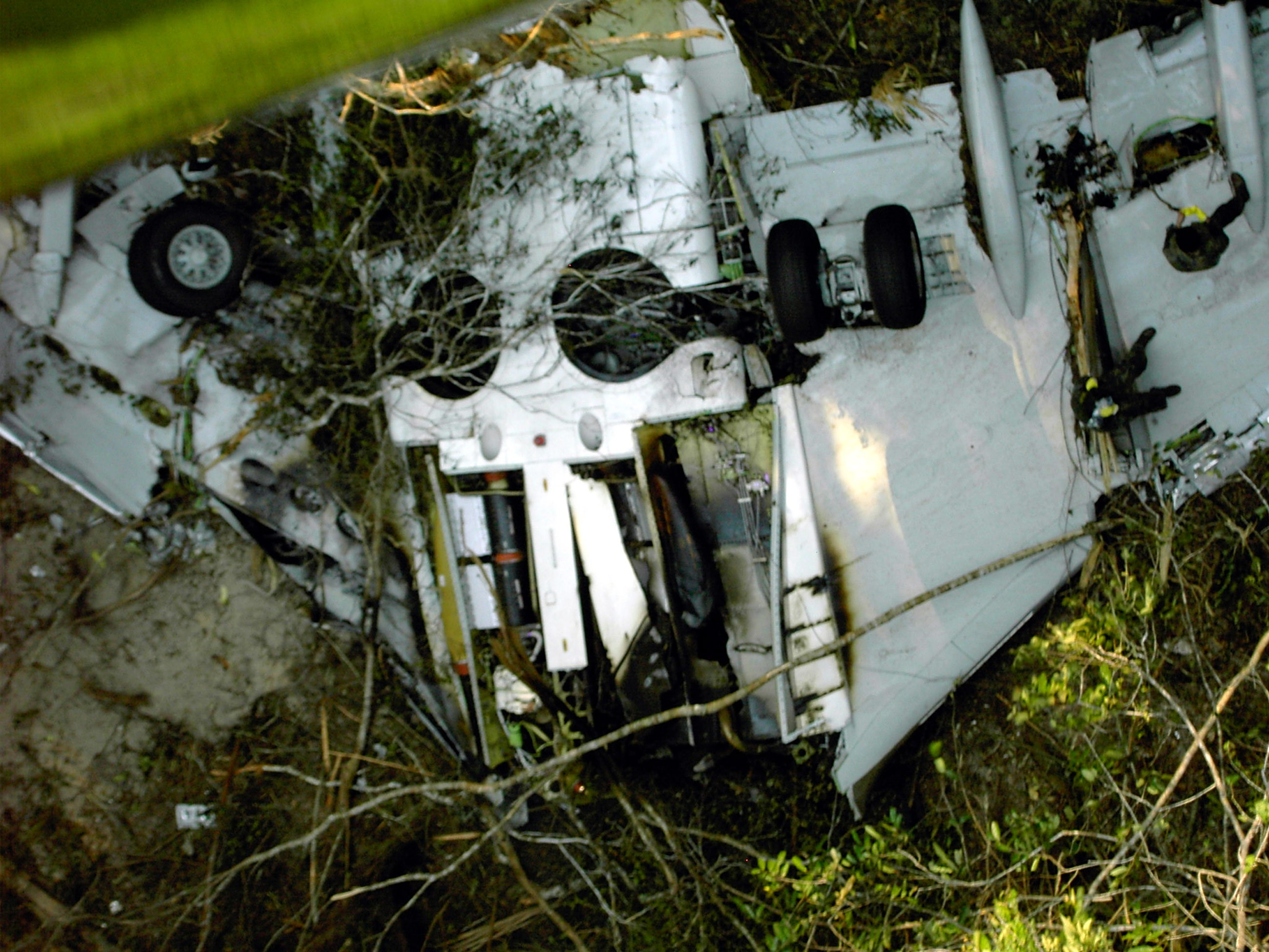
- Wreckage of Flight 1907

Accident
- Date: September 29, 2006
- Summary: Mid-air collision due to ATC error and pilot error
- Site: Amazon rainforest, Peixoto de Azevedo Mato Grosso, Brazil; 10°26′30″S 53°18′47″W
- Total fatalities: 154
- Total survivors: 7

First aircraft
- A Gol Transportes Aéreos Boeing 737-800, similar to the one involved
- Type: Boeing 737-8EH(SFP) (Note: The airliner was a Boeing 737-800(SFP) model, with "SFP" denotes it was equipped with Short Field Performance package. Boeing assigns a unique code for each company that buys one of its airliners, which is applied as a suffix to the model number at the time the aircraft is built, hence "737-8EH" designates a 737-800 built for Gol Transportes Aéreos (customer code EH).)
- Operator: Gol Transportes Aéreos
- IATA flight No.: G31907
- ICAO flight No.: GLO1907
- Call sign: GOL 1907
- Registration: PR-GTD
- Flight origin: Eduardo Gomes International Airport, Manaus, Amazonas
- Stopover: Brasília International Airport, Lago Sul, Federal District
- Destination: Rio de Janeiro/Galeão International Airport, Rio de Janeiro, Brazil
- Occupants: 154
- Passengers: 148
- Crew: 6
- Fatalities: 154
- Survivors: 0

Second aircraft
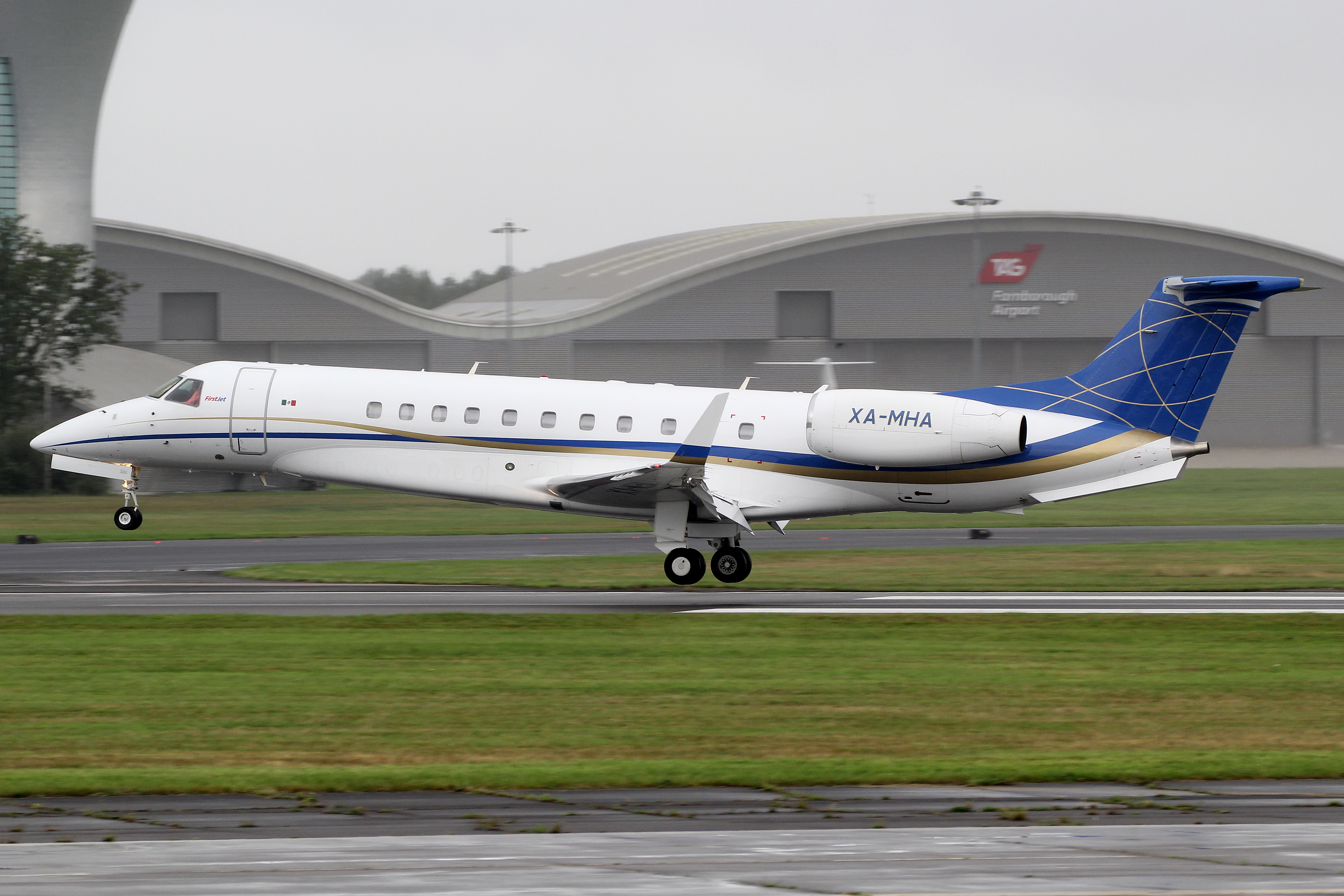
- The Embraer Legacy 600 involved in the collision, seen in 2015 with a newer registration
- Type: Embraer Legacy 600
- Operator: ExcelAire (delivery flight)
- Call sign: NOVEMBER 600 X-RAY LIMA
- Registration: N600XL
- Flight origin: São José dos Campos Airport, São Paulo
- 1st stopover: Eduardo Gomes International Airport, Amazonas
- 2nd stopover: Fort Lauderdale–Hollywood International Airport, Florida, US
- Destination: Long Island MacArthur Airport, Ronkonkoma, New York, US
- Occupants: 7
- Passengers: 5
- Crew: 2
- Fatalities: 0
- Survivors: 7

On September 29, 2006, Gol Transportes Aéreos Flight 1907, a Boeing 737-800 on a scheduled domestic passenger flight from Manaus, Amazonas, to Brasília and Rio de Janeiro, collided mid-air with an Embraer Legacy 600 business jet flying on an opposite heading over the Brazilian state of Mato Grosso. The winglet of the Legacy sliced off about half of the 737's left wing, causing the 737 to break up and crash into an area of dense jungle, killing all 154 passengers and crew on board. Despite sustaining serious damage to its left wing and tail, the Legacy landed with its 7 occupants uninjured.

The accident was investigated by the Brazilian Aeronautical Accidents Investigation and Prevention Center (Portuguese: Centro de Investigação e Prevenção de Acidentes Aeronáuticos – CENIPA) and the US National Transportation Safety Board (NTSB), and a final report was issued in 2008. CENIPA concluded that the accident was caused by air traffic control (ATC) errors, combined with mistakes made by the American pilots on the Legacy, including a failure to recognize that their traffic collision avoidance system (TCAS) was not activated, while the NTSB determined that both flight crews acted properly and were placed on a collision course by ATC, deeming the Legacy pilots' disabling of their TCAS system to be only a contributing factor rather than a direct cause.

The accident triggered a crisis in Brazilian civil aviation. It remains the second-deadliest plane crash in Brazil, after TAM Airlines Flight 3054 in 2007.

== Background ==
=== Boeing aircraft and crew ===
Nationalities of Passengers and Crew
Nationality	Passengers	Crew	Total
Brazil	105	6	111
Argentina	10	0	10
United States	6	0	6
Mexico	5	0	5
France	4	0	4
Venezuela	4	0	4
Australia	3	0	3
Canada	3	0	3
Colombia	3	0	3
Portugal	2	0	2
South Africa	2	0	2
Japan	1	0	1
Total	148	6	154

The Gol Transportes Aéreos twin turbofan Boeing 737-800 aircraft, registered as PR-GTD, was a new Short Field Performance variant, with 186 seats (36 Economy Plus and 150 Economy seats). It logged 202 hours and 18 minutes of flight time in 162 takeoff and landing cycles before the collision.

On board the Boeing 737 were 6 crew members and 148 passengers. The 6 crew members and 105 of the passengers were Brazilian; the remaining passengers were of various other nationalities. The crew consisted of Captain Decio Chaves Jr., 44, First Officer Thiago Jordão Cruso, 29, and four flight attendants. The captain, who had also been serving as a Boeing 737 flight instructor for the airline, had 15,498 total flight hours, with 13,521 on the Boeing 737. The first officer had 3,981 total flight hours, with 3,081 in the Boeing 737.

Gol Transportes Aéreos Flight 1907 departed Eduardo Gomes International Airport in Manaus on September 29, 2006, at 15:35 Brazilian standard time (BRT) (18:35 UTC), (Note: All times given in this article use the standard time zone of Brazil (BRT), which is UTC−3:00, as this corresponds to the time at the national capital city, Brasília. The state of Mato Grosso, where the collision occurred, is in fact in the BRT−1 (UTC−4:00) time zone.) en route to Rio de Janeiro–Galeão International Airport, with a planned intermediate stop at Brasília International Airport.

=== Embraer aircraft and crew ===
The twin turbofan Embraer Legacy 600 business jet, serial number 965 and registration N600XL, newly built by Embraer and purchased by ExcelAire Service Inc. of Ronkonkoma, New York, was on a delivery flight by ExcelAire from the Embraer factory to the United States. It departed from São José dos Campos-Professor Urbano Ernesto Stumpf Airport (SJK), near São Paulo, at 14:51 BRT (17:51 UTC), and was en route to Eduardo Gomes International Airport (MAO) in Manaus as a planned intermediate stop.

Final tally of passenger nationalities
Nationality	Passengers	Crew	Total
United States	3	2	5
Brazil	2	0	2
Total	5	2	7

The ExcelAire flight crew consisted of Captain Joseph Lepore, 42, and First Officer Jan Paul Paladino, 34, both US citizens. Lepore had been a commercial pilot for more than 20 years and had logged 9,388 total flight hours, with 5.5 hours in the Legacy 600. Paladino had been a commercial pilot for a decade and had accumulated more than 6,400 flight hours, including 3.5 hours in the Legacy 600, as well as 317 hours flying as captain of the Embraer ERJ-145 and ERJ-135 jet aircraft for American Eagle Airlines. (Note: The ERJ-145 and ERJ-135 aircraft are regional jets of the same family as the Legacy.) Paladino had also served as first officer for American Airlines, flying the McDonnell Douglas MD-82, MD-83, and Boeing 737-800 between the US and Canada. Both pilots were legally qualified to fly the Embraer Legacy as captain.

Two of the five passengers were Embraer employees, two were ExcelAire executives, and the fifth passenger was New York Times business travel columnist Joe Sharkey, who was writing a special report for Business Jet Traveler.

== Accident ==
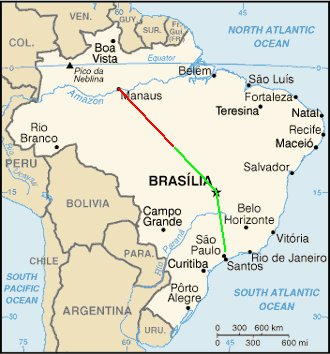
Approximate flight paths from flight origins to crash site. Boeing southeast bound Embraer northwest bound

At 16:56:54 BRT (19:56:54 UTC), the Boeing 737 and the Embraer Legacy jet collided almost head-on at 37,000 feet (11,000 m), approximately midway between Brasília and Manaus, near the town of Matupá, 750 kilometres (466 mi; 405 nmi) southeast of Manaus. The left winglet of the Embraer sheared off about half of the 737's left wing (the 737's left engine was unaffected, remaining attached to the wing part that stayed attached to the aircraft), causing the 737 to nosedive and enter an uncontrollable spin, which quickly led to an in-flight breakup. The cockpit voice recorder (CVR) cut off at 16:57:47, less than a minute after the collision. The interruption was attributed to the loss of electrical power following the in-flight structural breakup of the aircraft at an altitude of approximately 8,000 feet (2,400 m).

The Boeing 737 crashed into an area of dense rainforest, 200 kilometres (124 mi; 108 nmi) east of the municipality of Peixoto de Azevedo. All 154 passengers and crew died and the aircraft was destroyed, with the wreckage scattered around the crash site.

The Embraer jet was able to continue flying, despite serious damage to the left horizontal stabilizer and left winglet, though its autopilot disengaged and it required an unusual amount of force on the yoke to keep the wings level. (Note: From CENIPA final report, under section 2.2.1 (Damage to airplanes): "The N600XL airplane sustained serious damages in the left wing and in the left stabilizer/elevator assembly".) With radio relay assistance from Polar Air Cargo Flight 71, a Boeing 747 cargo aircraft flying in the area, the Embraer's crew successfully landed the crippled jet at Cachimbo Airport, part of the large military complex Campo de Provas Brigadeiro Velloso, about 160 kilometres (100 mi; 90 nmi) from the collision point. Passenger and journalist Joe Sharkey described his experience on board the Embraer in an article for The New York Times titled "Colliding With Death at 37,000 Feet, and Living", filed on 1 October 2006:

And it had been a nice ride. Minutes before we were hit, I had wandered up to the cockpit to chat with the pilots, who said the plane was flying beautifully. I saw the readout that showed our altitude: 37,000 feet. I returned to my seat. Minutes later came the strike (it sheared off part of the plane's tail, too, we later learned).

== Detention and charging of Embraer crew ==
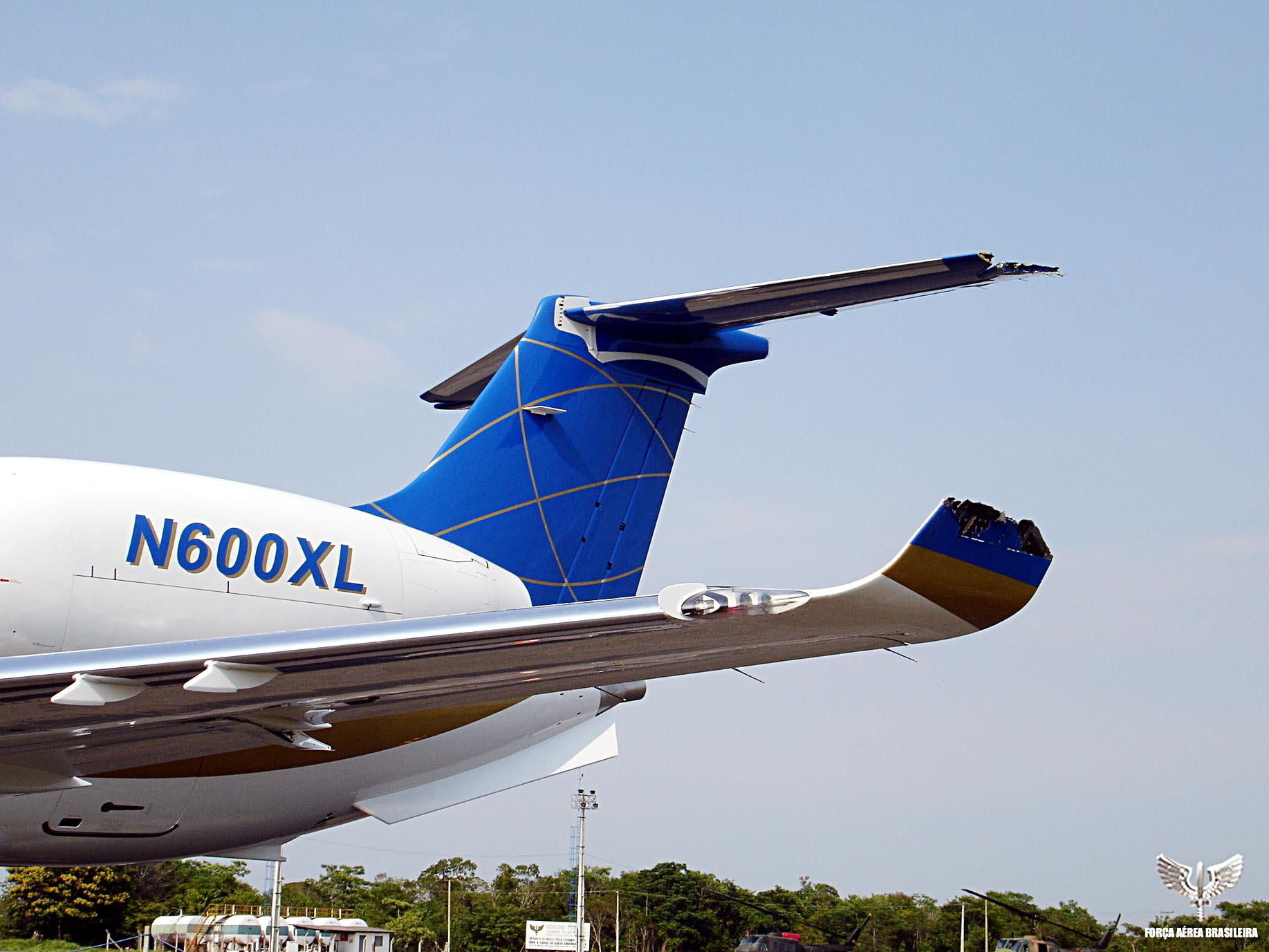
Damage to the Legacy's left side

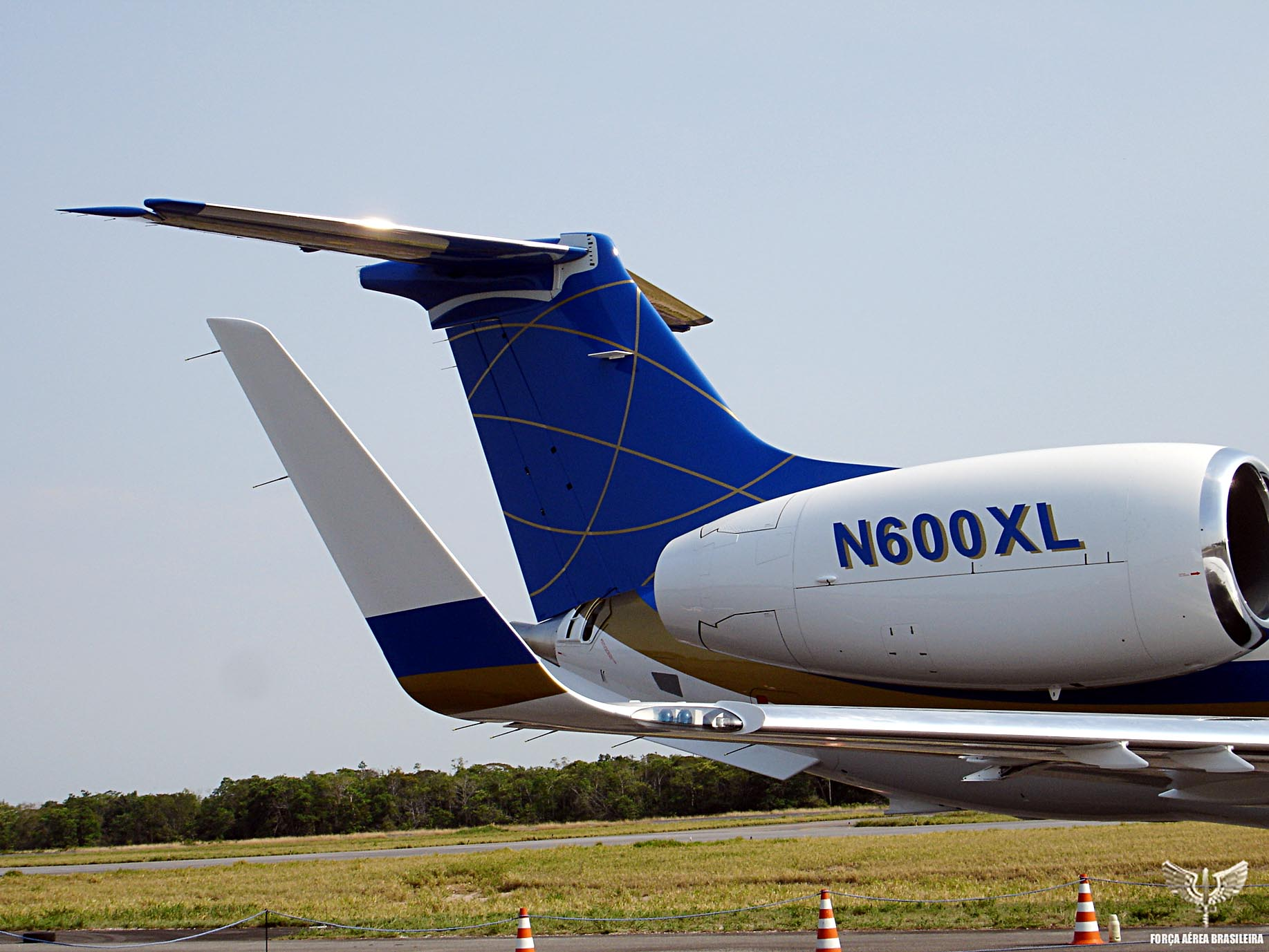
The undamaged right side of the Legacy, for comparison

Immediately after the Embraer's emergency landing at the Cachimbo air base, Brazilian Air Force and Agência Nacional de Aviação Civil (ANAC) officials detained and interviewed the flight crew. The two "black boxes"—the cockpit voice recorder (CVR) and the flight data recorder (FDR)—were removed from the Embraer, and sent to São José dos Campos, São Paulo State, and from there to Ottawa, Canada, at the Transportation Safety Board (TSB) laboratories, for analysis. (Note: Canada was selected by CENIPA as a "neutral site" for the FDR and CVR analysis, due to the sensitive political aspects of this investigation.)

In an initial deposition, the Embraer flight crew testified that they were cleared to flight level 370, about 37,000 feet (11,000 m) above mean sea level, by Brasília ATC, and were level at that assigned altitude when the collision occurred. They also asserted that they had lost contact with Brasília ATC at the time of the collision, and their anticollision system did not alert them to any oncoming traffic.

On October 2, 2006, the Embraer's captain and first officer were ordered by the Mato Grosso Justice Tribunal to surrender their passports pending further investigation. The request, made by the Peixoto de Azevedo prosecutor, was granted by Judge Tiago Sousa Nogueira e Abreu, who stated that the possibility of pilot error on the part of the Embraer crew could not be ruled out. The Embraer crew was forced to remain in Brazil until their passports were released to them more than two months after the accident, after a federal judge ruled that no legal grounds existed for "restricting the freedom of motion of the foreigners."

Prior to their scheduled departure to the United States, the crew was formally charged by Brazilian Federal Police with "endangering an aircraft", which carries a penalty up to 12 years in prison. The two pilots had to explain why they had not switched on the transponder. They were allowed to leave the country after signing a document promising to return to Brazil for their trials or when required by Brazilian authorities. They picked up their passports and flew back to the US.

== Search and recovery operation ==
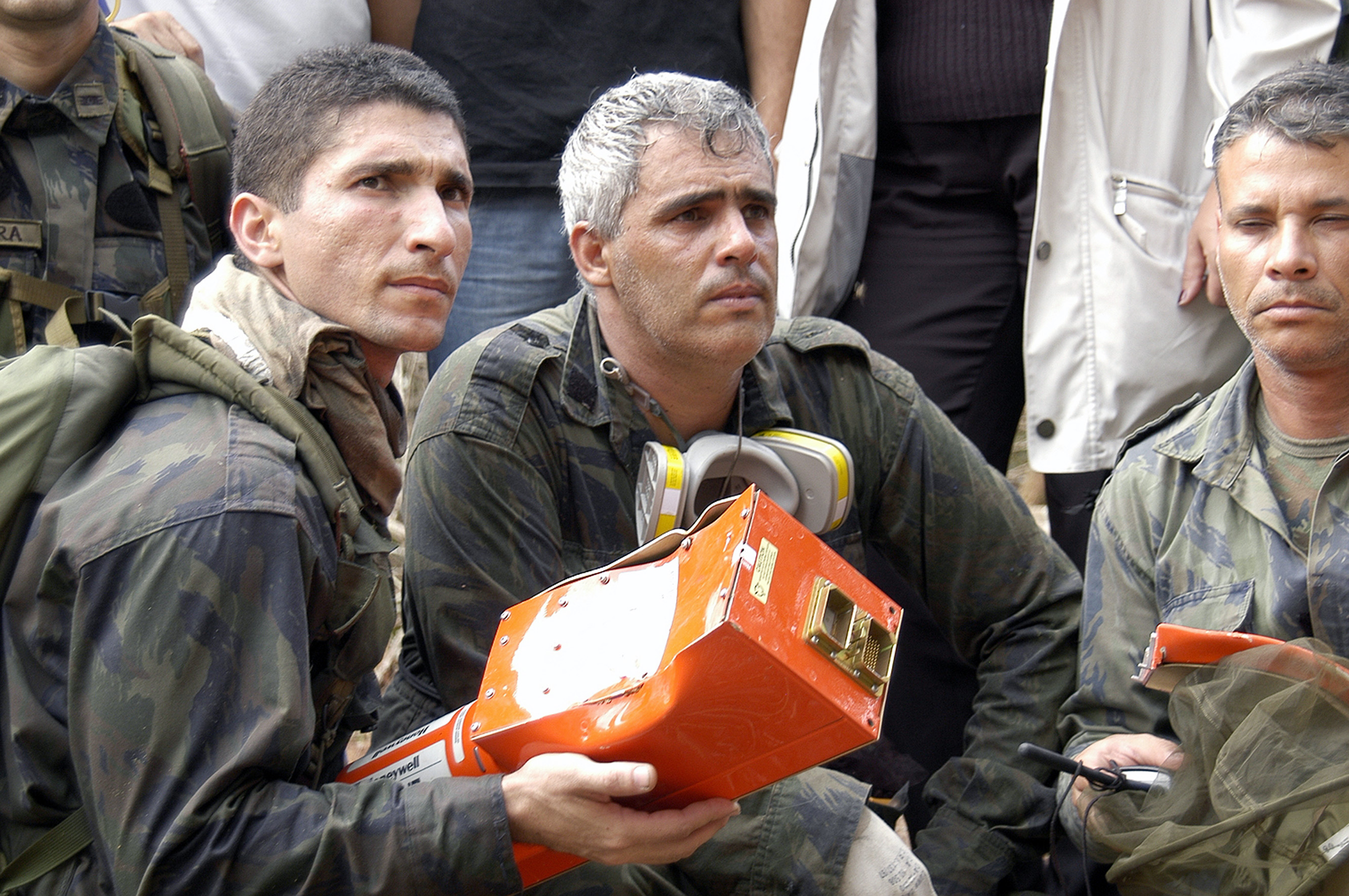
The Boeing's flight data recorder

The Brazilian Air Force (the Força Aérea Brasileira or "FAB") sent five fixed-wing aircraft and three helicopters to the region for an extensive search and rescue (SAR) operation. As many as 200 personnel were reported to be involved in the operation, among them a group of Kayapo people familiar with the forest. The crash site of Gol Flight 1907 was spotted on 30 September by the air force, at coordinates, 200 kilometres (120 mi; 110 nmi) east of Peixoto de Azevedo, near Fazenda Jarinã, a cattle ranch. Rescue personnel reportedly were having difficulty reaching the crash site due to the dense forest. The Brazilian airport operating company, Infraero, at first indicated the possibility of five survivors, but a later statement from the Brazilian Air Force, based on data collected by their personnel, who rappelled to the crash site, and local police who assisted in the SAR effort, confirmed no survivors. Brazilian President Luiz Inácio Lula da Silva declared three days of national mourning.

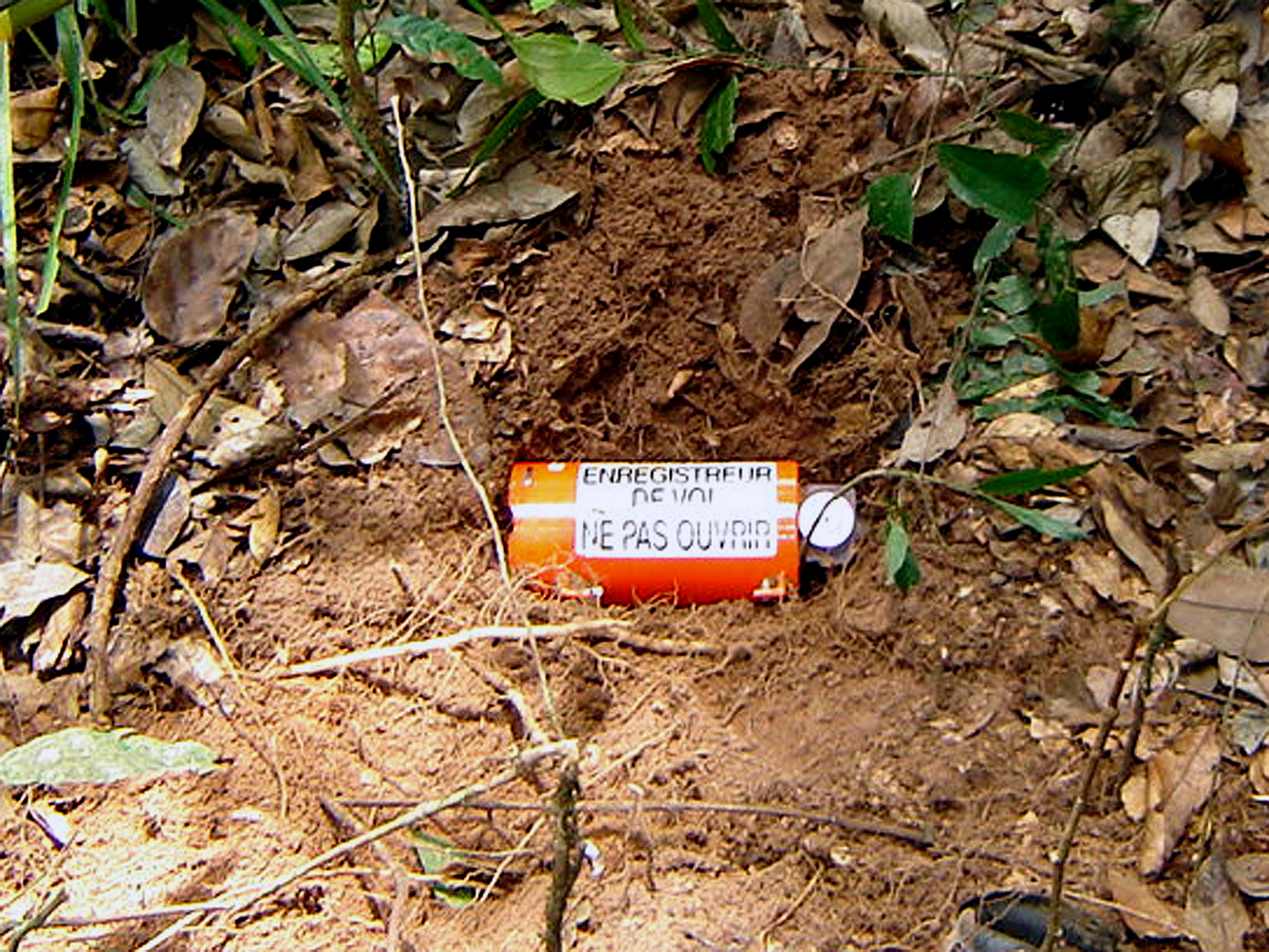
The Boeing's cockpit voice recorder memory module was found embedded in the soil, after four weeks of intensive searching. (Note: The French text reads "FLIGHT RECORDER DO NOT OPEN.")

The FDR and a nondata part of the cockpit voice recorder (CVR) from the Boeing 737 were found on 2 October and handed over to the investigators, who sent them to the TSB for analysis. On October 4, the recovery crews began moving the bodies to the temporary base established at the nearby Jarinã ranch. The FAB deployed a C-115 Buffalo aircraft to transport the bodies to Brasília for identification.

On October 25, after nearly four weeks of intensive searching in the jungle by about 200 Brazilian Army troops equipped with metal detectors, the memory module of the Boeing's cockpit voice recorder was found. The module was discovered intact, separated from other wreckage pieces, embedded in about 20 centimetres (8 in) of soil, and was also sent for analysis by the TSB in Canada. The recovery teams worked intensively for nearly seven weeks in a dense jungle environment, searching for and identifying the victims' remains. All the victims had been recovered and identified by DNA testing by November 22.

== Investigation ==
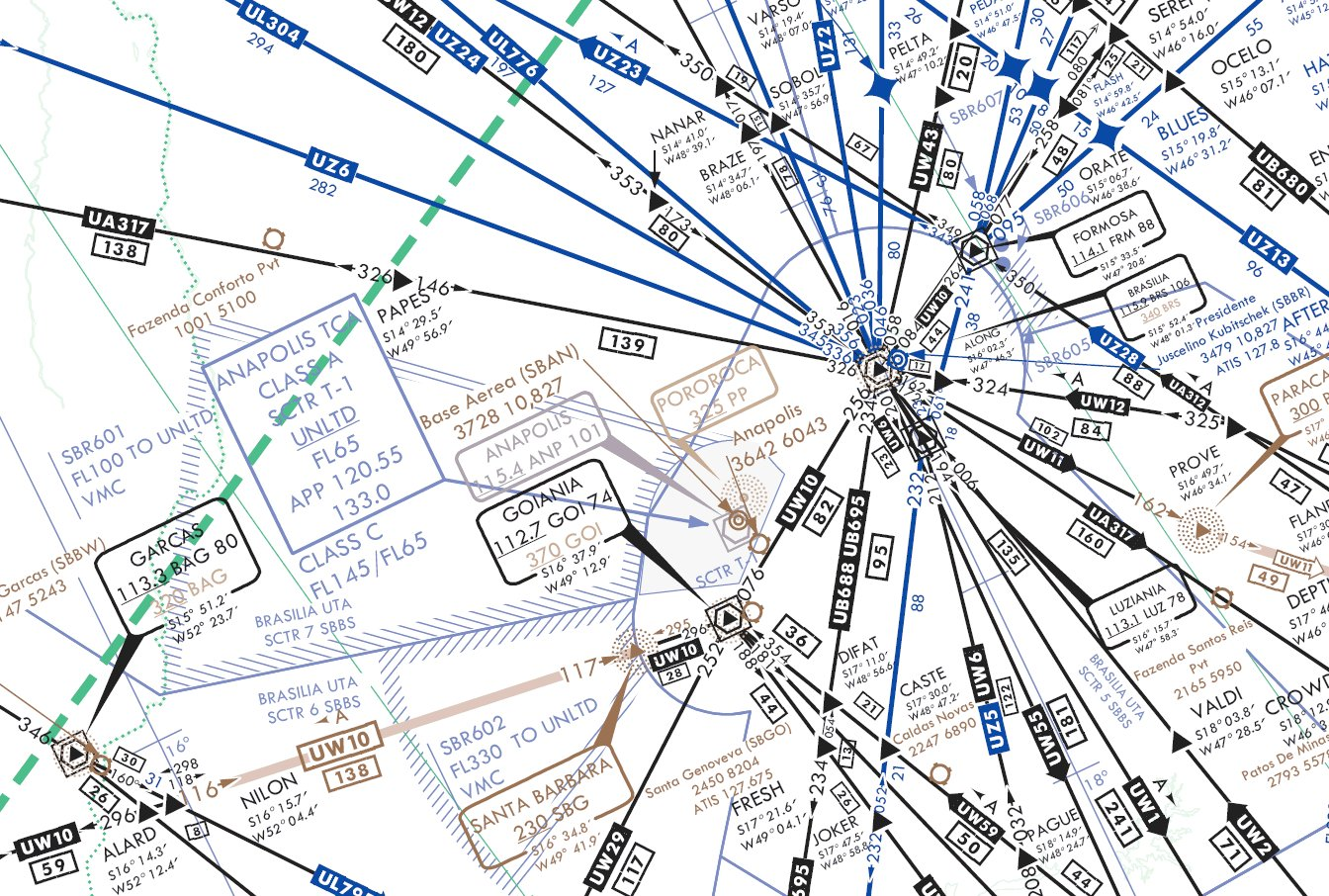
IFR high altitude en route chart section of Brasília area, depicting UW2, UZ6 airways

The accident was investigated by the Brazilian Air Force's Aeronautical Accidents Investigation and Prevention Center (CENIPA) and the US National Transportation Safety Board (NTSB). In accordance with the provisions of ICAO Annex 13, the NTSB participated in the investigation as representative for the state (country) of manufacture of the Boeing, state of registry and operator of the Embraer, and state of manufacture of the Honeywell avionics equipment installed in both planes.

Once the black boxes and communication transcripts were obtained, the investigators interviewed the Legacy jet's flight crew and the air traffic controllers, trying to piece together the scenario that allowed two modern jet aircraft, equipped with the latest anticollision gear, to collide with each other while on instrument flights in positive control airspace.

The Embraer's flight plan consisted of flying at FL370 to Brasília, (Note: FL370 is flight level 370, which is an altitude around 37,000 feet (11,278 m) above mean sea level.) on airway UW2, followed by a planned descent at Brasília to FL360 (about 36,000 feet [11,000 m]), proceeding outbound from Brasília northwest-bound along airway UZ6 to the Teres fix, an aeronautical waypoint located 282 nautical miles (325 mi; 522 km) northwest of Brasília, where a climb to FL380 (about 38,000 feet [12,000 m]) was planned. According to the filed flight plan, the Embraer was scheduled to have been level at FL380, proceeding towards Manaus, while passing the eventual collision point, which was about 307 kilometres (191 mi; 166 nmi) northwest of Teres.

The Embraer's crew asserted in their depositions and subsequent interviews that they were cleared by ATC to FL370 for the entire trip, all the way to Manaus. The actual transcript of the clearance given to the Embraer's crew prior to takeoff at São José dos Campos at 14:41:57, as later released by CENIPA, was:

November Six Zero Zero Xray Lima, ATC clearance to Eduardo Gomes, flight level three seven zero direct Poços de Caldas, squawk transponder code four five seven four, after take-off perform Oren departure.

The Embraer's crew's altitude clearance to FL370 was further confirmed after their handoff to Brasília, during which they had the following radio exchange with ATC at 15:51.

N600XL:	Brasília, November six hundred Xray Lima, level ... flight level three seven zero, good afternoon.
ATC:	November six zero zero Xray Lima, squawk ident, radar surveillance. (Note: Pressing the transponder's "ident" button in the aircraft ("squawking ident") allows the ATC controller to positively identify its target on the radar screen, verifying its position and altitude.)
N600XL:	Roger.

This was the last successful two-way radio communication between the Embraer's crew and ATC prior to the collision.

=== Embraer flight and communication sequence ===
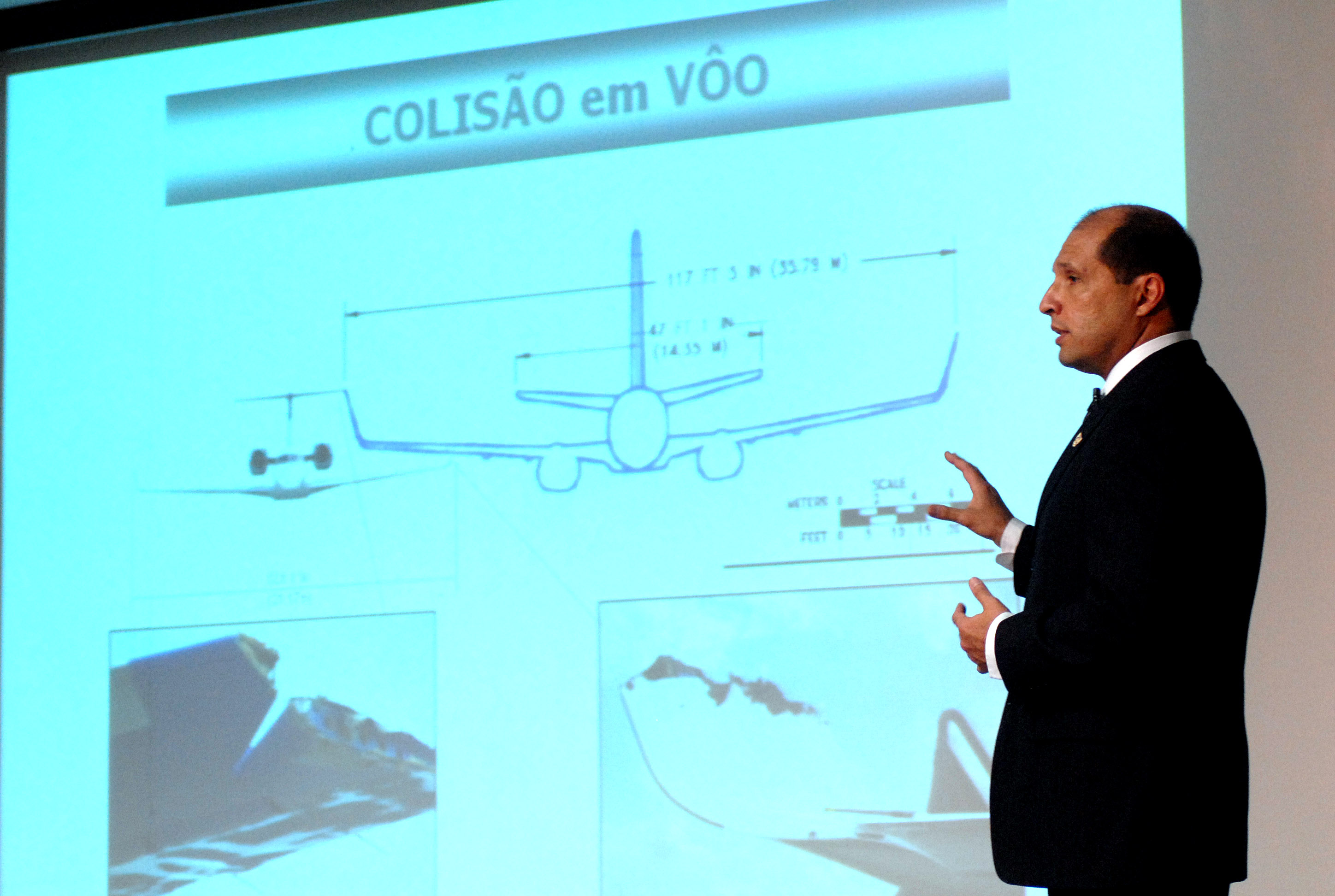
Investigation committee president Col. Rufino Antônio da Silva Ferreira presents the preliminary findings on 16 November 2006.

The Embraer took off from São José dos Campos at 14:51, reaching FL370 at 15:33, 42 minutes later, where it remained until the collision. ATC maintained normal two-way radio contact with the Embraer until 15:51, when the last successful radio exchange with the Embraer was made on VHF frequency 125.05 MHz with Brasília Center. (Note: Brasília Area Control Center is designated as ACC BS.) At that point, the Embraer was just approaching the Brasília VOR. (Note: The VHF omnidirectional range (VOR) transmitter installation is a defined waypoint, underlying the airway.) The Embraer overflew the Brasília VOR at 15:55, four minutes later, and proceeded northwest-bound along UZ6. At 16:02, seven minutes after crossing the Brasília VOR, secondary radar contact was lost with the Embraer, thus stopping the display of the Embraer's reported altitude (mode C) on the controller's radar screen. (Note: As was later revealed in CENIPA's final report, the military controller's screen automatically reverted to displaying an unreliable altitude, normally used for air defense, derived from the primary radar detected range and the target's angle above the horizon.; CENIPA hypothesizes in its final report that, at this point, the Embraer's captain inadvertently deactivated the transponder. The captain has denied this in depositions and interviews.)

No attempt was made by either the Embraer or Brasília Center to contact each other from 15:51 until 16:26, when, 24 minutes after the loss of secondary radar contact, (Note: Loss of secondary radar indicates to a controller that the aircraft's transponder signal is not being received by ATC.) Brasília Center called the Embraer and received no reply. Brasília Center then unsuccessfully attempted to contact the Embraer six more times, between 16:30 and 16:34. At 16:30, the Embraer's primary radar target became intermittent, and disappeared completely from the radar screen by 16:38. Brasília Center unsuccessfully attempted to effect a handoff of the Embraer to Amazonic Center at 16:53, by calling the Embraer in the blind. (Note: A handoff in aviation parlance refers to the transfer of responsibility for an aircraft under radar control from one controller to the next.; Amazonic Area Control Center is designated as ACC AZ.)

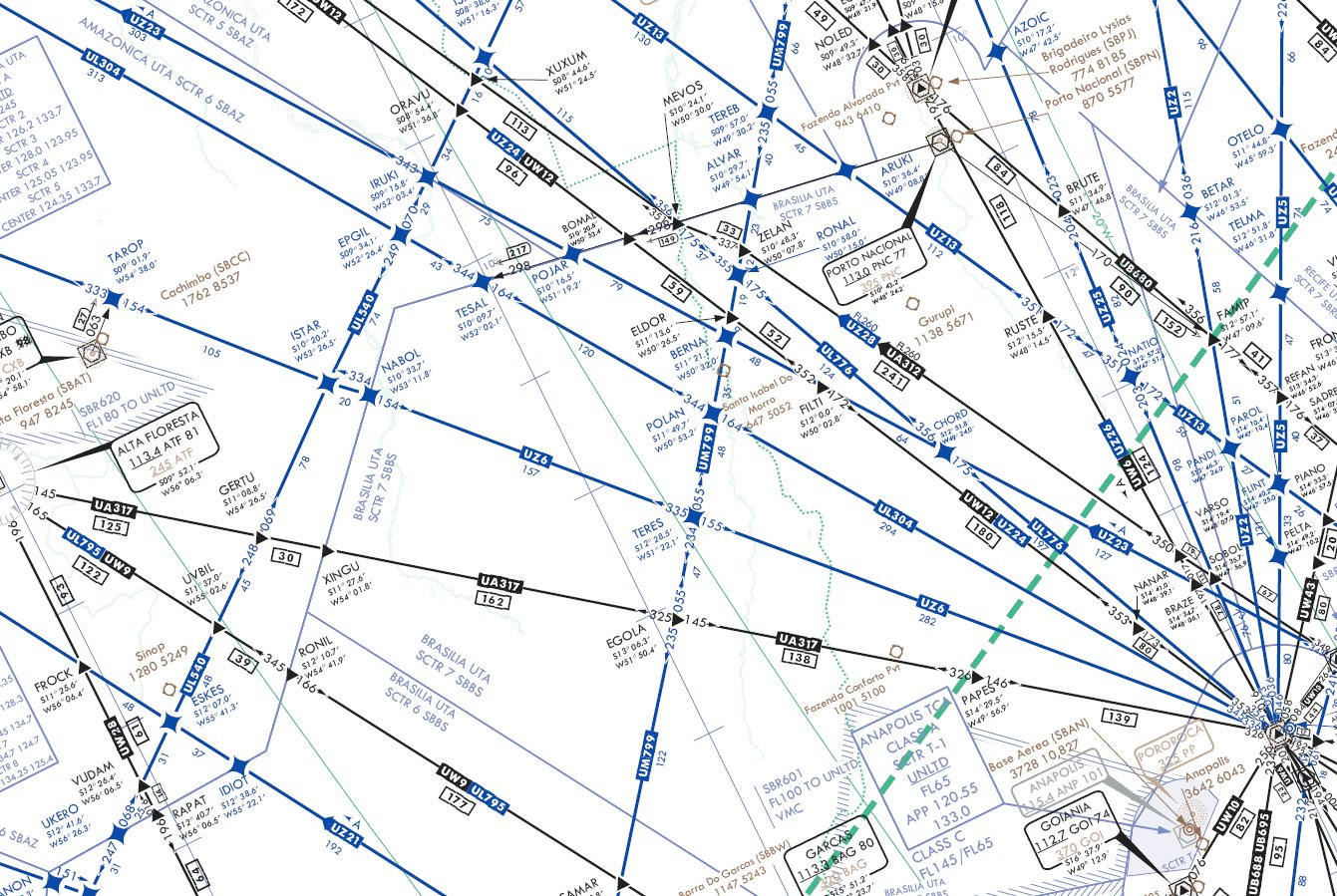
IFR high-altitude en route chart section of Teres fix area, depicting UZ6 airway and Cachimbo air base; crash site is between Nabol and Istar fixes on UZ6

The Embraer, though, started calling Brasília Center, (Note: According to CENIPA, the last transmission from ATC that was recorded on the Embraer's CVR was at 16:23:29, about 25 minutes before the Embraer's first officer tried to call ATC.) also unsuccessfully, from 16:48 and continued with 12 more unsuccessful attempts until 16:53. Some limited contact was made at that point, but the Embraer was unable to receive the Amazonic Center frequencies. The Embraer then continued its attempts to reach Brasília Center, seven more times until the collision.

The collision occurred at 16:56:54 BRT (19:56:54 UTC) at FL370, and neither TCAS had activated or alerted its respective crew, nor did any crew see the oncoming traffic visually or initiate any evasive action prior to the collision. While both planes were equipped with TCAS, the Embraer's transponder was later determined to have ceased operating almost an hour earlier, at 16:02, rendering both planes unable to automatically detect each other.

At 16:59:50, about three minutes after the collision, Amazonic Center started to receive the Embraer's secondary radar reply, with its correct altitude and last assigned code. At 17:00:30, Amazonic Center unsuccessfully attempted to contact the Embraer by radio. The Embraer started calling on the emergency frequency, 121.5 MHz, immediately after the collision, but as later determined in the CENIPA report, the emergency transceivers in the area were not operational, thus the crew was unable to reach ATC on that frequency. At 17:01:06, the Embraer established contact on the emergency frequency with a Boeing 747 cargo aircraft, Polar 71, which attempted to relay to ATC their request for an emergency landing, and continued to provide relay and translation assistance to the Embraer until its eventual landing.

At 17:18:03, the Embraer contacted the Cachimbo Airport control tower directly to coordinate its emergency landing there, and landed safely at Cachimbo at 17:23:00.

=== Gol 1907 flight and communication sequence ===
Gol 1907 took off from Manaus at 15:35, flying southeast-bound along UZ6 and reaching FL370 at 15:58, 23 minutes later, where it remained until the collision. There were no radio or radar contact problems with the flight until its handoff to Brasília Center. No known attempts were made by ATC to warn Flight 1907 of the conflicting traffic.

=== NTSB safety recommendation ===
On 2 May 2007, the NTSB issued a safety recommendation document that included an interim summary of the investigation, as well as immediate safety recommendations that the NTSB believed should be implemented by the US Federal Aviation Administration (FAA) to enhance flight safety. The NTSB reported that the Embraer apparently experienced a TCAS outage, unknown to its flight crew prior to the collision, according to the CVR:

Preliminary findings in the ongoing investigation indicate that, for reasons yet to be determined, the collision avoidance system in the Legacy airplane was not functioning at the time of the accident, thereby disabling the system's ability to detect and be detected by conflicting traffic. In addition, CVR data indicate that the flight crew was unaware that the collision avoidance system was not functioning until after the accident.

The NTSB added that the design of the Embraer's avionics is such that the nonfunctioning of the TCAS that apparently occurred is shown by a small static white text message, which may not be noticeable by the flight crew. The NTSB also noted:

Using only static text messages to indicate a loss of collision avoidance system functionality is not a reliable means to capture pilots' attention because these visual warnings can be easily overlooked if pilots' attention is directed elsewhere in the flight environment.

Based on its observations, the NTSB recommended to the FAA that design changes be implemented to improve the noticeability of TCAS announcements, and that the FAA advise pilots of all aircraft types to familiarize themselves with the details of this accident, with the ways in which a pilot could inadvertently cause the loss of transponder or TCAS function, and how to recognize a loss of function.

== Final reports ==
=== CENIPA report ===
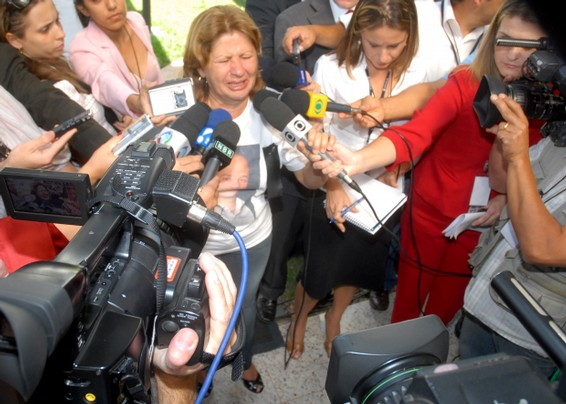
Relatives of Gol 1907 victims react to presentation of CENIPA's final report in Brasília.

On December 10, 2008, more than two years after the accident, CENIPA issued its final report, describing its investigation, findings, conclusions, and recommendations. The CENIPA report includes a "Conclusions" section that summarizes the known facts and lists a variety of contributing factors relating both to air traffic controllers and to the Legacy jet's flight crew. According to CENIPA, the air traffic controllers contributed to the accident by originally issuing an improper clearance to the Embraer, and not catching or correcting the mistake during the subsequent handoff to Brasília Center or later on. CENIPA also found errors in the way the controllers handled the loss of radar and radio contact with the Embraer.

CENIPA concluded that the ExcelAire pilots also contributed to the accident with, among other things, their failure to recognize that their transponder was inadvertently switched off, thereby disabling the collision avoidance system on both aircraft, as well as their overall insufficient training and preparation.

=== NTSB report ===
The NTSB issued its own report on the accident, which was also appended to the CENIPA report with the following probable cause statement:

The accident investigation was under the authority of the Brazilian Centro de Investigação e Prevenção de Acidentes Aeronáuticos (CENIPA). Under the provisions of ICAO Annex 13, the United States, as state of registry and operator of the Excelaire Legacy, and state of manufacture of the Boeing 737 and Honeywell avionics equipment in both airplanes, provided an accredited representative and technical advisors. The U.S. team included an accredited representative from the NTSB's Major Investigations Division as well as NTSB technical advisors in operations, systems, air traffic control, flight recorders, and aircraft performance. Additional technical advisors from Boeing, Excelaire, Honeywell, and FAA were also included.

The NTSB further added these contributing factors:

The accredited representative and advisors participated throughout the investigation in Brazil and in the United States, including a recent final meeting in Brasília. In May of 2007, the NTSB issued three safety recommendations to the U.S. Federal Aviation Administration as a result of findings discovered as part of the NTSB's participation in the investigation. In accordance with ICAO Annex 13 procedures, the U.S. accredited representative provided detailed comments on November 18, 2008 to CENIPA's draft report, which have been appended to the final version of the CENIPA investigative report.

=== Conflicting CENIPA and NTSB conclusions ===
CENIPA and the NTSB collaborated in the accident investigation, and while agreeing on most of the basic facts and findings, the two organizations arrived at conflicting interpretations and conclusions. The CENIPA report concluded that the accident was caused by mistakes made both by ATC and the ExcelAire pilots, whereas the NTSB report focused on the controllers and the ATC system, concluding that both flight crews acted properly, but were placed on a collision course by the ATC.

According to Aviation Week

the U.S. National Transportation Safety Board (NTSB) strongly disagreed with the Brazilian conclusions regarding the Legacy pilots' actions as a causal factor, noting, "The crew flew the route precisely as cleared and complied with all ATC instructions," as did the GOL airlines crew. Aviation Week adds that "the Brazilian military operates that country's air traffic control system, conducted the investigation, and authored the report."

== Aftermath ==
=== Aviation crisis ===
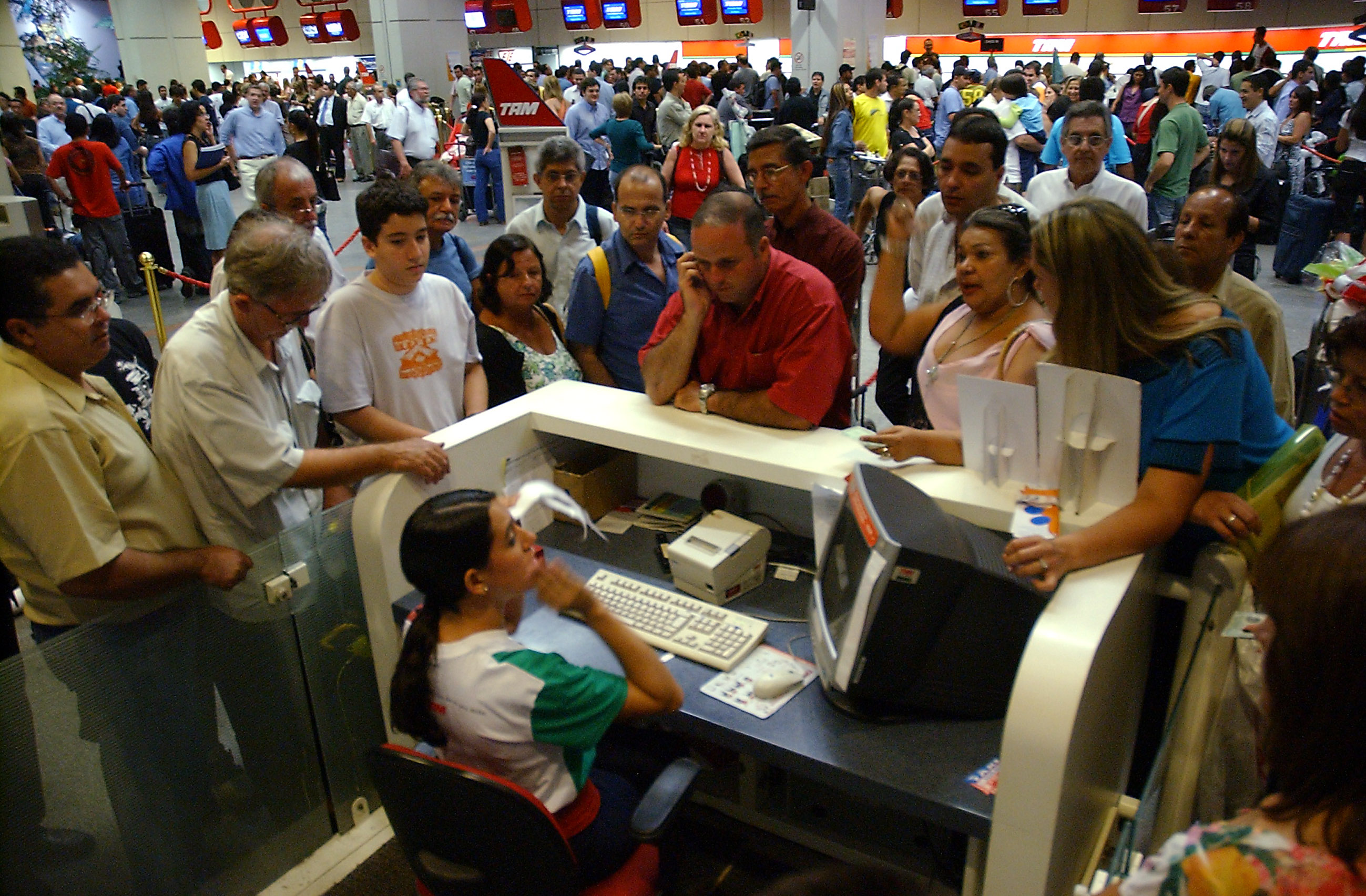
Passengers at Brasília International Airport enquiring about delayed flights in 2007

The crash of Flight 1907 precipitated a major crisis in Brazil's civil aviation system, which included lengthy flight delays and cancellations, ATC work-to-rule slowdowns and strikes, and public-safety concerns about Brazil's airport and air traffic infrastructure.

Historically, Brazil was ruled by its armed forces from 1964 until 1985. Since then, a civilian government has taken over, but the country's airways (as of 2018) continue to be controlled and operated by the Brazilian Air Force (FAB) via its Department of Airspace Control (Portuguese: Departamento de Controle do Espaço Aéreo (DECEA)), overseen by a civilian defense minister. Most of Brazil's air traffic controllers are military non-commissioned officers, and all area control centers are run by the FAB.

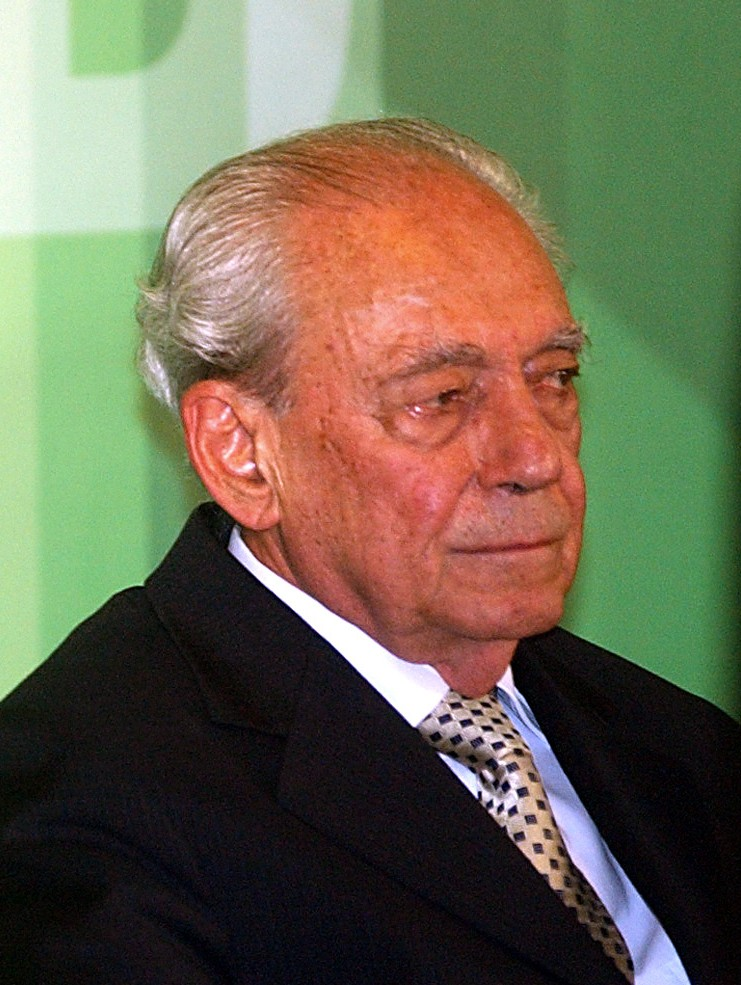
Brazilian Defense Minister Waldir Pires was accused of mismanaging Brazil's air traffic system.

In October 2006, as details surrounding the crash of Flight 1907 began to emerge, the investigation seemed to be at least partly focused on possible ATC errors. This led to increasing resentment by the controllers and exacerbated their already poor labor relations with their military superiors. The controllers complained about being overworked, underpaid, overstressed, and forced to work with outdated equipment. Many have poor English skills, limiting their ability to communicate with foreign pilots, which played a role in the crash of Flight 1907. In addition, the military's complete control of the country's aviation was criticized for its lack of public accountability.

Amid rising tensions, the air traffic controllers began staging a series of work actions, including slowdowns, walkouts, and even a hunger strike. This led to chaos in Brazil's aviation industry – major delays and disruptions in domestic and international air service, stranded passengers, canceled flights, and public demonstrations. Those who blamed various civilian and military officials for the growing crisis called for their resignations.

On July 26, 2007, following an even deadlier crash on July 17 (TAM Airlines Flight 3054) that killed 199 people, President Luiz Inácio Lula da Silva fired his defense minister, Waldir Pires, who had been in charge of the country's aviation infrastructure and safety since March 2006, and was widely criticized for their failures. On the same day, Lula appointed former Supreme Court president Nelson Jobim to replace Pires, and vowed to improve Brazil's ATC system.

=== Legal action ===
==== Civil litigation ====
On November 6, 2006, the families of 10 of the deceased filed a lawsuit for negligence against ExcelAire and Honeywell, alleging that the ExcelAire pilots were flying at an "incorrect altitude" and that the Honeywell transponder was not functioning at the time of the collision. Other suits were subsequently filed on behalf of other victims, with similar allegations against ExcelAire and Honeywell. The victims' families also filed suits against other US-based defendants, including the two Embraer pilots, as well as Raytheon, Lockheed Martin, and Amazon Tech (manufacturers of Brazil's ATC equipment), and ACSS (manufacturer of the Embraer's TCAS).

The attorney representing the Embraer crew, Miami-based Robert Torricella, responded to the allegation that the crew was flying at an "incorrect altitude" by stating that according to international regulations, clearances and directives issued by ATC supersede a previously filed flight plan, and in this case:

... the flight plan cleared by air traffic control at the time of departure required the Embraer to fly all the way to Manaus at 37,000 feet, and absent contrary directives from air traffic control, the Embraer was obligated to follow its cleared flight plan. As the findings of the investigation are made public, we are confident that ExcelAire's pilots will be exonerated.

A Honeywell spokesperson stated, "Honeywell is not aware of any evidence that indicates that its transponder on the Embraer Legacy was not functioning as designed or that Honeywell was responsible for the accident."

On July 2, 2008, US District Court Judge Brian Cogan of the Eastern District of New York dismissed the families' suits against all the US-based defendants under the premise of forum non-conveniens. Without ruling on the merits of the cases, and while allowing discovery to continue, Cogan recommended the Brazilian court system as a more appropriate jurisdiction for the dispute.

==== Criminal proceedings ====
On June 1, 2007, Murilo Mendes, a Brazilian federal judge in the small city of Sinop, Mato Grosso, near the crash site of the Boeing, indicted the two Embraer pilots and four Brasília-based air traffic controllers for "exposing an aircraft to danger." On December 8, 2008, he dismissed charges of negligence against the pilots, but left in place a charge of "imprudence". He also dismissed all charges against two of the four Brasília-based controllers and reduced the charges against the other two, but supported bringing new charges against a fifth controller, based in São José dos Campos, the Embraer's departure point. On January 12, 2010, his ruling was overturned by Judge Candido Ribeiro in a federal court in Brasília, reinstating the negligence charges against the pilots.

On October 26, 2010, a military court convicted air traffic controller Sgt. Jomarcelo Fernandes dos Santos, sentencing him to 14 months in jail for failing to take action when he saw that the Embraer's anticollision system had been turned off. Santos was to remain free pending the outcome of the appeal process. Four other controllers were acquitted for lack of proof. On 17 May 2011, Judge Mendes sentenced air traffic controller Lucivando Tiburcio de Alencar to a term of up to three years and four months, but ruled he is eligible to do community service in Brazil, instead, and acquitted Santos on charges of harming Brazil's air transport safety.

On May 16, 2011, Judge Mendes sentenced the two pilots to four years and four months of prison in a "semi-open" facility for their role in the collision, but he commuted the sentences to community service to be served in the United States. Brazilian authorities accused the pilots of turning off the Legacy's transponder moments before the accident and turning it on again only after the crash, but this was denied by the crew in a deposition via videoconference. Mendes said in his sentence that pilots had failed to verify the functioning of equipment for more than an hour, a length of time he called "an eternity" in aviation. On October 9, 2012, Brazilian federal prosecutors announced that they had successfully appealed the sentence of the pilots, asking to increase their sentences by 17 months (a total of 5 years and 9 months). The new trial was scheduled for October 15, with the pilots again facing trial in absentia. On that date, the court upheld the prior convictions, but modified the sentences to 37 months for each, requiring that the pilots "report regularly to authorities and stay home at night."

In October 2015, Brazil's Supreme Court rejected the pilots' appeal, ordering them to return to Brazil to serve out their sentences.

In 2019, a Brazilian judge ruled that the pilots could serve their sentences in the United States. In March 2020, after exhausting their appeals, Brazil requested their extradition. In 2023, the United States rejected the request. On June 6, 2024, another Brazilian judge dismissed the entire case against the pilots because the statute of limitations had expired.

=== Embraer jet ===
The Embraer jet was temporarily repaired on Cachimbo Airport, and on November 19, 2010, the jet was flown to Cleveland Hopkins International Airport. It is currently operating for FlyMex, a Mexican charter airline based out of Toluca International Airport as "XA-FLY".

== In popular culture ==
The accident is featured in the tenth episode of Season 5 of Mayday, also known as Air Crash Investigation and Air Disasters. The episode is titled "Phantom Strike".

== See also ==
- List of notable civilian mid-air collisions

== Bibliography ==
- Carvalho, Paulo Victor Rodrigues de; Gomes, José Orlando; Huber, Gilbert Jacob; Vidal, Mario Cesar (May 2009). "Normal people working in normal organizations with normal equipment: System safety and cognition in a mid-air collision". Applied Ergonomics. 40 (3): 325–340. doi:10.1016/j.apergo.2008.11.013.
