= Clay Lacy Aviation =

American aviation company

IATA	ICAO	Call sign
—	CLY	CLAY LACY
- Founded: 1968; 58 years ago in Van Nuys, California
- Hubs: Van Nuys Airport, Los Angeles
- Secondary hubs: Boeing Field (King County International Airport), Seattle, Washington; Santa Ana, California; Oxford, Connecticut
- Fleet size: 157
- Headquarters: Los Angeles, United States
- Key people: Brian Kirkdoffer, Chairman
- Founder: Clay Lacy
- Employees: 847
- Website: www.claylacy.com

Notes
- Services: Air charter; Aircraft management; Fixed-base operator; Aircraft maintenance

Clay Lacy Aviation is a business aviation company founded at Van Nuys Airport (KVNY) in 1968 by Clay Lacy. Clay Lacy Aviation provides aircraft management, private air charter, aircraft maintenance, fixed-base operator (FBO) and other services to private and corporate clients. The company manages a nationwide fleet of more than 100 business jet aircraft, worth more than $1.5 billion, most of which are available for domestic and international private charter.

Operations centers, hangar facilities, and FAA Part 145 Repair Stations are located at Van Nuys Airport and Waterbury-Oxford Airport (KOXC) near New York. Managed jet aircraft are based at general aviation airports across the U.S. Clay Lacy also operates a full-service FBO at Van Nuys Airport and began operating an FBO at Orange County's John Wayne Airport in January 2021. A Clay Lacy Aviation FBO at Waterbury-Oxford Airport, announced in 2020, opened in 2024.

== History ==
In 1968, Clay Lacy Aviation began operations as an on-demand jet charter operator at Van Nuys Airport in Los Angeles. At the time it was the only jet charter company west of the Mississippi. Early clients included Hollywood celebrities such as Danny Kaye, Frank Sinatra, Dean Martin, Sammy Davis Jr., Carol Channing, Kirk Douglas, and Cary Grant. Over the next decade, the company began to offer aircraft management and maintenance services, and in 1981 established the first all-jet FBO.

In 2002, Clay Lacy expanded to the Pacific Northwest, with a hangar facility and full-service FBO at Boeing Field in Seattle. An additional 40,000 square-foot of hangar space was completed there in 2009. In 2016, the company opened an FAA Part 145 Repair Station and expanded its Seattle capabilities to include FAA-certified private jet charter services.

In 2006, Brian Kirkdoffer was promoted to company president. He had joined Clay Lacy as a pilot in 1990. He has flown more than 10,000 hours in Learjet and Gulfstream aircraft, and holds four world aeronautical speed records. He acquired majority interest in Clay Lacy Aviation in 2013, and is currently its Chairman.

In 2015, Clay Lacy completed a 6-acre development and improvement project at its Van Nuys FBO on the South Campus, opening 2.5 acres of new ramp space.

In 2016, Clay Lacy acquired Key Air, a long-time East Coast private aviation company, with an operations and maintenance center at Waterbury-Oxford Airport near New York. An FAA Part 145 Repair Station was certified in 2018.

In 2017, the company's ground operations at Seattle's Boeing Field earned the first IS-BAH Stage II registration in North America. IS-BAH is the International Standard for Business Aviation Handling.

In 2018, Clay Lacy marked its fiftieth anniversary in April, opened its first New York office in June, and sold its Boeing Field Seattle operation in December.

In January 2019, the company opened a new round-the-clock aircraft MRO (maintenance, repair and overhaul) facility at its Van Nuys Airport FAA Part 145 Repair Station. In April 2019, the FAA awarded Part 145 certification to the Clay Lacy aircraft maintenance operation at Waterbury-Oxford Airport, in Oxford, Connecticut.

In January 2020, Embraer expanded the authorized service center designation at Clay Lacy's Van Nuys Airport FAA Repair Station to include Embraer Legacy and Embraer Praetor business jets. Clay Lacy has been an authorized service center for Embraer Phenom 100 and Embraer Phenom 300 aircraft since 2009 and began performing 10-year inspections on those aircraft in 2019.

Responding to the COVID-19 pandemic, in April 2020 Clay Lacy developed and implemented the CleanCheck health and safety standard throughout its aircraft operations, based on recommendations and best practices from the Centers for Disease Control and Prevention (CDC), the United States Department of Transportation, and the Federal Aviation Administration (FAA). Also in April, and in response to COVID-19, the company broadened its aircraft detailing capabilities with disinfecting services, available through Clay Lacy maintenance centers and mobile response teams.

Clay Lacy terminal at KSNA

In September 2020, the Orange County Board of Supervisors concluded a four-year evaluation process and awarded Clay Lacy a thirty-five year, 15-acre leasehold to design, build, and operate a full-service FBO with hangar, office space, and private terminal at John Wayne Airport in Santa Ana, California. Operations began in January 2021.

Jet parking at Clay Lacy FBO, SNA: 2023

It announced a new $95 million FBO and hangar complex at the airport, to be built in two phases. Construction broke ground on the complex in November 2024, which will be the first FBO with ISI Sustainability Gold accreditation. The current John Wayne Airport FBO was ranked No. 1 in Line Service and Customer Service Representatives by AIN FBO Survey responders in 2024, 2025 and 2026.

A third Clay Lacy FBO, developed on a 16-acre, 30-year leasehold at Waterbury-Oxford Airport, was announced by the Connecticut Airport Authority in October 2020. The 40,000-square-foot hangar and FBO was set to open in 2024, expanding the company's operations in the northeastern United States and creating an estimated 100 new jobs. An additional 120,000 square feet of aircraft maintenance and hangar space will be constructed in subsequent years. The company announced its first hangar equipped with 29-foot doors to accommodate newer and larger aircraft at the site had sold out in 2023 ahead of its scheduled opening.

In November 2021, Transport Canada certified Clay Lacy's FAA Part 145 Repair Station at Waterbury-Oxford Airport to provide aircraft maintenance services for Canadian-registered business jets. It earned European maintenance certification from EASA in 2021, and authorization from Mexico's Federal Civil Aviation Agency in 2022.

The FAA recognized Clay Lacy in March 2023 as meeting the standards of the agency's safety management system voluntary program (SMSVP). The FAA validation placed the company among the top 2% of Part 135 operators in the U.S. that have completed the agency's SMSVP process and demonstrated a culture of safety promotion.

In March 2024, Clay Lacy Aviation became a dealer and installer of Starlink, SpaceX's low-earth orbit satellite in-flight internet service. It will install the high-speed, global-coverage solutions at its Van Nuys and Oxford MROs.

Its founder, Clay Lacy, received a lifetime achievement award from Aviation Week Network's 66th Laureate Awards, held in March 2024. The award recognized his career milestones and aviation achievements, including Lacy being "instrumental in launching the business jet era."

In November 2024, Clay Lacy Aviation was awarded a lease for a new FBO at Friedman Memorial Airport (KSUN) in Sun Valley, Idaho. When completed in 2027, the facility will offer a 4,500-sq-ft terminal, more than 110,000 sq ft of hangar space that will accommodate ultra-long-range business jets, a 14,500-sq-ft enclosed vehicle parking garage, and four acres of ramp.

== Sustainability strategy and carbon-neutral operations ==
Clay Lacy began executing a comprehensive nationwide sustainability strategy in 2020, partnering with World Kinect Energy Services, a subsidiary of World Fuel Services. Clay Lacy's strategy addresses every aspect of ground and flight operations at each of its facilities, as well as offering sustainability and carbon offset programs for customers. The strategy “incorporates renewable energy and sustainable fuels such as Renewable Diesel (RD) and Sustainable Aviation Fuel (SAF). It also establishes new sustainable purchasing strategies, EV charging stations and the use of carbon credits to offset emissions that cannot otherwise be reduced.”

In January 2021, Clay Lacy completed the installation of a 30,000-square-foot solar panel array at its Van Nuys Airport headquarters, These solar panels will offset the equivalent of 500 metric tons of CO_{2} annually. Additionally, 200 conventional lighting fixtures were replaced with LED fixtures, and 44 electric vehicle charging stations were installed on the property.

In February 2021, 4AIR, a sustainability rating program for private aviation, selected Clay Lacy as its first official rating partner, providing carbon neutral validation of the company's facilities for 2020, and awarding "the first-ever carbon emissions offset rating for FBO and maintenance repair and overhaul facilities." 4AIR gave its carbon neutral rating to Clay Lacy's facilities in Van Nuys, San Diego and Orange County, California, Seattle, Washington, and Oxford, Connecticut. Going forward, 4AIR will also evaluate and validate the company's carbon offset programs, as well as reductions from solar energy and renewable fuel use.

In March 2021, the company began offering SAF from World Fuel Services at its Van Nuys Airport and John Wayne Orange County Airport FBOs. Also in March, Air Elite announced that the Clay Lacy FBO at Van Nuys Airport has been carbon neutral since 2019.

In September 2021, Eviation Aircraft, a global manufacturer of all-electric aircraft, announced a partnership with Clay Lacy to provide electric charging as part of its fixed-base operator (FBO) network of services. The partnership represents the first FBO agreement that will allow charging of Eviation Alice aircraft in preparation for the plane's expected 2024 entry into service.

In December 2021, Clay Lacy became the first company certified to the National Air Transportation Association’s Sustainability Standard for Aviation Businesses. This initiative was created to encourage FBOs, airports, and other aviation businesses to pursue flexible, cost-effective options to lower their carbon footprint.

In April 2022, Clay Lacy received certification from the United States Environmental Protection Agency's Green Power Partnership, a program that supports business and organizations that voluntarily adopt the use of renewable energy, one of the first in the industry to be so recognized.

In January 2024, Clay Lacy partnered with electric aircraft companies to install air taxi chargers at its FBOs. The installation of electrical infrastructure to support Joby's Global Electric Aviation Charging System (GEACS) will be part of Clay Lacy's FBO at John Wayne Airport. It also plans to develop concept of operations and charging infrastructure for eVTOL manufacturer Overair at its Van Nuys and Orange County locations.

In October 2025, it announced a collaboration with Supernal to develop an FBO network for eVTOL operations, initially at its two California FBOs. SkyMark Refuelers announced Clay Lacy's Van Nuys location will utilize a 7,000-gallon-capacity tanker, the largest aircraft refueler in the U.S. with an all-electric powertrain.

The company was recognized as a VNY Friendly Flyer eight times, and three times at its Orange County location.

== Aviation training and education scholarships ==
In addition to direct donations to aviation training and educational programs, Clay Lacy offers pilot scholarships through the John D. Odegard School of Aerospace Sciences at the University of North Dakota and Orange Coast College in Costa Mesa, California, as well as aviation scholarships through the Flight Path Museum and Learning Center in Los Angeles, and Gold Stars to Blue Skies, a program which helps the children of fallen U.S. Marines. Scholarships are also available to students attending the LAUSD's North Valley Occupational Center Aviation Mechanics School and the Connecticut Aerotech School in Hartford, Connecticut. The company supports educational efforts through events such as Aviation Career Day at Van Nuys Airport, and mentoring and job shadowing programs.

== Charter Fleet ==
Clay Lacy Aviation fleet
Aircraft	In fleet	Passengers	Notes
Bombardier Challenger 300	5	8
Bombardier Challenger 600	1	7
Bombardier Global Express 5000	2	13
Bombardier Global Express 6000	1	16
Bombardier Global Express	1	15
Citation Ultra	1	7
Cessna CE-750 (Citation X)	1	8
Dassault Falcon 2000	7	8
Dassault Falcon 900	2	11
Dassault Falcon 7X	2	12
Embraer Legacy 600	2	13
Gulfstream 150	1	7
Gulfstream G280	1	9
Gulfstream IV	6	13 or 14
Gulfstream G550	4	12 or 14
Gulfstream G-650	2	16
Gulfstream V	1	14
Hawker Siddeley HS.125	1	8
Hawker HS-125-850XP	1	8
Pilatus PC-24	1	6
Total	43

== Safety and operational certifications ==
- FAR Part 135 Air Carrier Certificate BKEA492C
- FAR Part 145 Repair Station BKER301L – Los Angeles, California
- FAR Part 145 Repair Station 81CR317D – Oxford, Connecticut
- ARGUS Platinum
- Wyvern Wingman
- International Standard for Business Aviation Operations (IS-BAO) Stage III
- FAA Safety Management System Voluntary Program (SMSVP) validation
- NATA Maintenance Technician Five-Star
