= Peixoto de Azevedo =

- Municipality
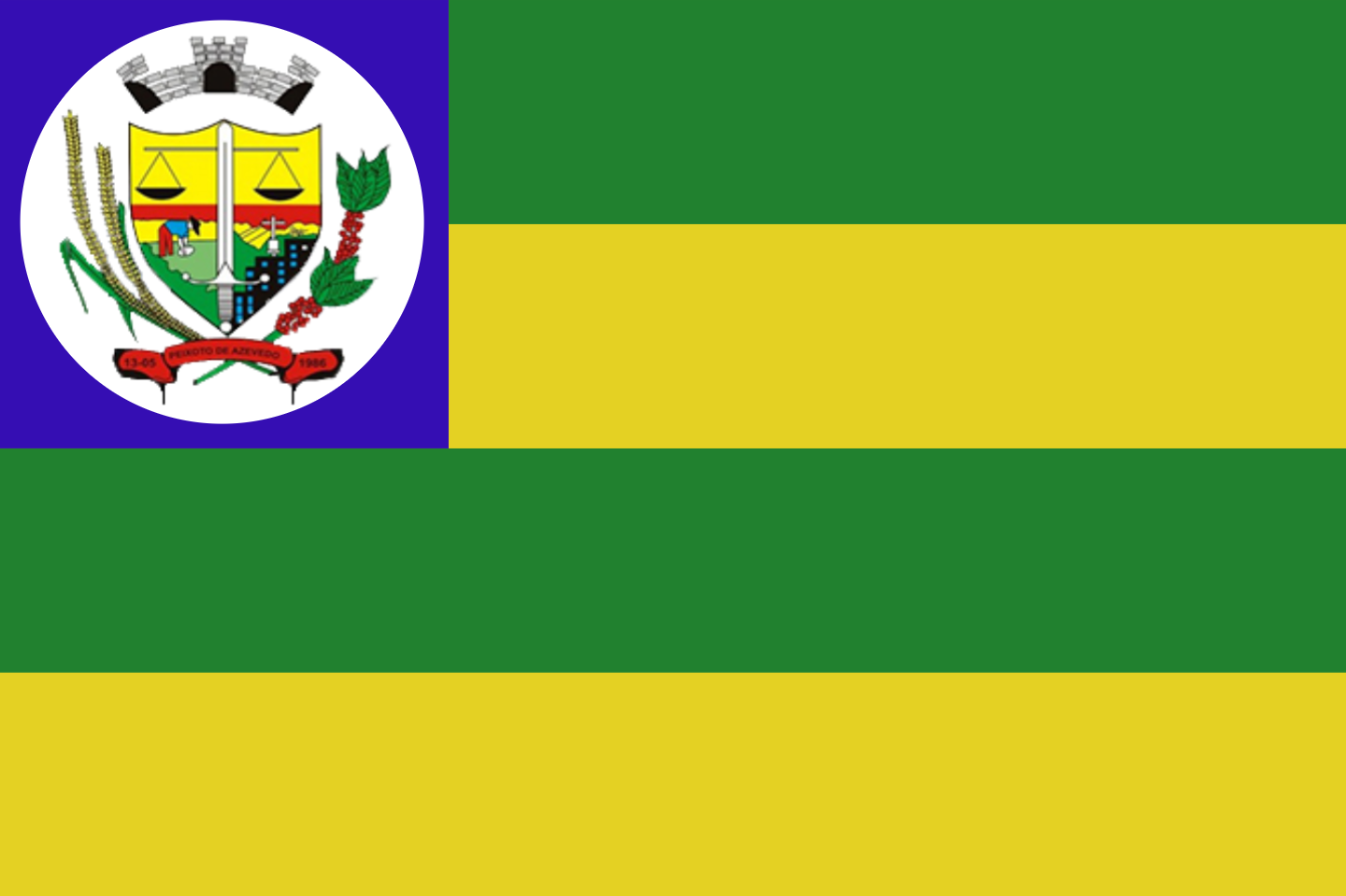
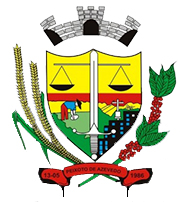
- Flag Coat of arms

- Location in Mato Grosso state

- Location in Brazil
- Coordinates: 10°14′33″S 54°59′37″W
- Country: Brazil
- Region: Central-West
- State: Mato Grosso
- Founded: May 13, 1986

Government
  - Mayor: Mauricio Ferreira de Souza (PSDB)

Area
  - Total: 14,257.8 km^{2} (5,505.0 sq mi)
- Elevation: 346 m (1,135 ft)

Population (2020)
  - Total: 35,338
  - Density: 2.4785/km^{2} (6.4193/sq mi)
- Time zone: UTC−3 (BRT)

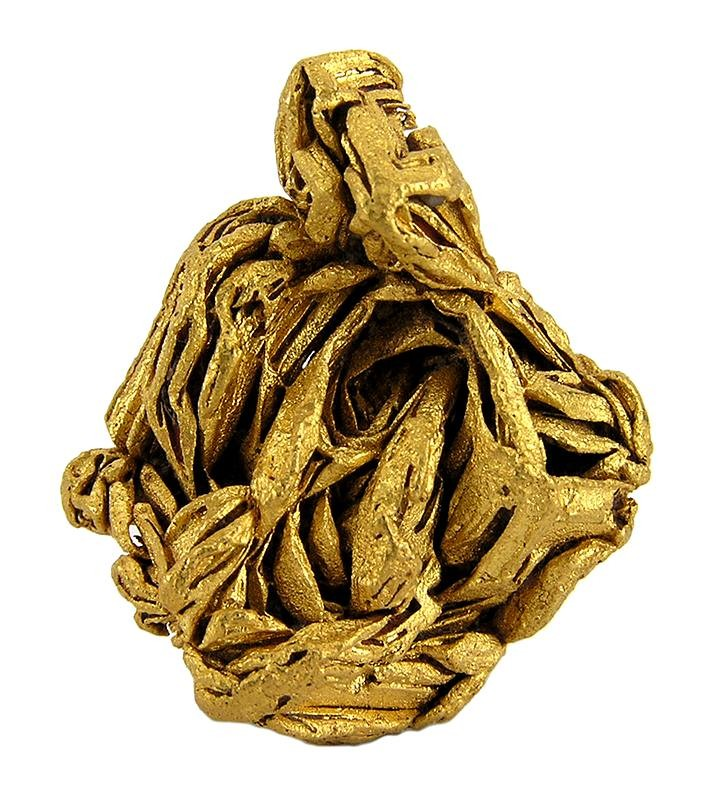
Gold specimen from the Alta Floresta Gold Province, near Peixoto de Azevedo. 2.6 × 2.2 × 1.4 cm.

Peixoto de Azevedo is a municipality in the Brazilian state of Mato Grosso. Peixoto de Azevedo was the ancient location of the Panará indigenous people. They were expelled during the 19th century gold rush in the region. From the 20th century, the Panará people were relocated to the Kapoto-Jarinã indigenous territory created by the Villas-Bôas brothers.

The nearby Alta Floresta Gold Province has 38 gold mines.

On September 29, 2006, Gol Transportes Aéreos Flight 1907 crashed approximately 200 kilometers (120 mi) east of the city center.

The geographic center of Brazil is located within the municipality.
