= Embraer Legacy =

The Embraer Legacy is a family of business jets produced by Embraer.

Aircraft include:

- Embraer Legacy 450, mid-size business jet
- Embraer Legacy 500, extended Legacy 450 model, introduced in 2014
- Embraer Legacy 600, a derivative of the Embraer ERJ 145 family
- Embraer Legacy 650, a longer-range version of the Legacy 600
