= ExcelAire =

Airline of the United States

- ExcelAire updated their logo in 2025.
IATA	ICAO	Call sign
—	XLS	EXCELAIRE
- Founded: 1985
- AOC #: EW7A331N
- Operating bases: Long Island MacArthur Airport
- Fleet size: 10
- Headquarters: 1965 Smithtown Ave, Ronkonkoma, NY 11779
- Key people: Marcos Bell, Bob Sherry, Tom Robbins, Christopher Curtin, And Chuck Kegley
- Website: http://www.excelaire.com

ExcelAire, LLC is a United States air charter company based at Long Island MacArthur Airport in Ronkonkoma, New York. It specializes in worldwide jet and helicopter charters, aircraft management, maintenance and aircraft sales.

== Overview ==
Founded in 1993 by Bob Sherry, ExcelAire is currently headed by his son Robert Sherry Jr., its president. ExcelAire is a division of Executive Fliteways and its headquarters is housed in 200,000 square feet of hangar space at MacArthur Airport.

In 2012, ExcelAire was acquired by Hawthorne Global Aviation Services. It was subsequently purchased by Executive Fliteways in 2023.

== Fleet ==
As of April 2022, ExcelAire had 7 Aircraft.

ExcelAire Fleet
Aircraft	In service	Registration number
Embraer Legacy 600	2	N679MS And N515JT
Bombardier Challenger 604	1	N604RR
Cessna Citation Latitude	1	N393KB
Gulfstream G280	1	N968UD
Gulfstream G-V	1	N565JT
Pilatus PC-12NG	1	N367JK

== Accidents and incidents ==
- On September 29, 2006, a Embraer Legacy 600 on a delivery flight by ExcelAire and piloted by Jean Paul Paladino and Joseph Lepore was involved in a mid-air collision with Gol Transportes Aéreos Flight 1907. All 154 people on board the Gol Boeing 737 were killed, but everyone on the Legacy jet survived. At the time it was Brazil's deadliest aviation crash, surpassing VASP Flight 168 and surpassed by TAM Airlines Flight 3054 at Congonhas-São Paulo Airport on July 17, 2007. After investigation by NTSB and CENIPA, it was found that the pilots Joe Lepore and Jan Paladino had turned the TCAS off, allowing the two aircraft to get on a collision course that caused the crash.
- On February 2, 2022, a Pilatus PC-12 registration N357JK operated by ExcelAire collided with and damaged the nose and right wing of a parked British Aerospace 125, registration N207K at Long Island MacArthur Airport. After investigation by the NTSB, it was found that pilot Glenn Hausmann failed to position the airplane's power control lever (PCL) where the preflight checklist required it before engine start. The applied engine power was almost at full resulting in the plane overpowering its brakes.
