= Waldir Pires =

Brazilian politician (1926–2018)

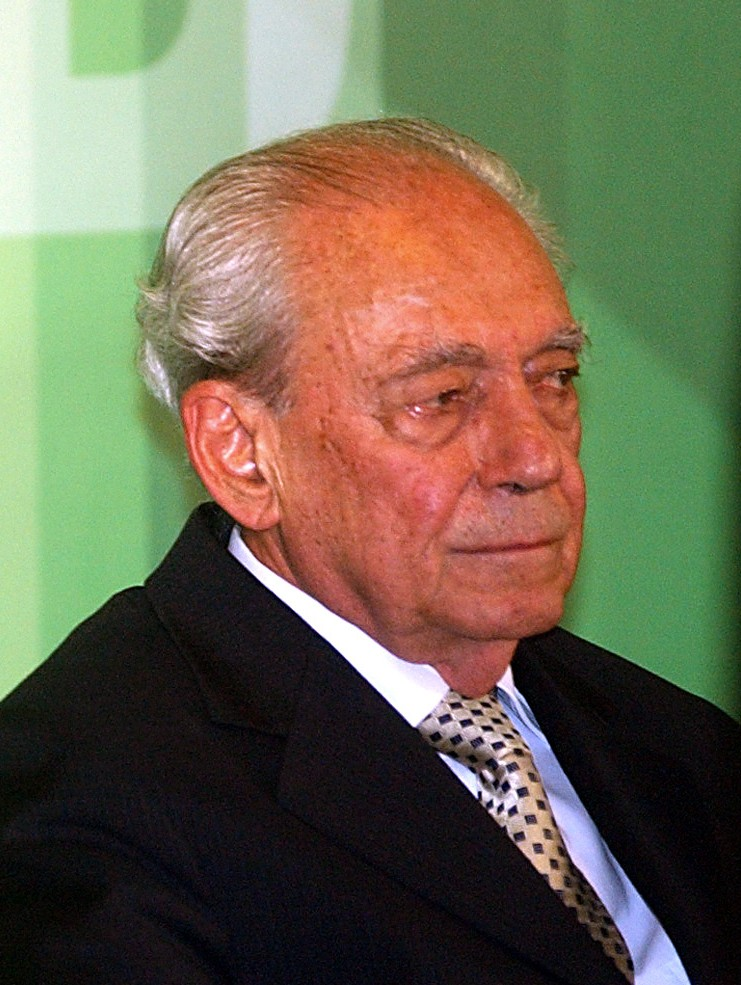

Minister of Defence of Brazil
- In office 31 March 2006 – 25 July 2007
- President: Luiz Inácio Lula da Silva
- Preceded by: José Alencar
- Succeeded by: Nelson Jobim

41st Governor of Bahia
- In office 15 March 1987 – 14 May 1989
- Preceded by: João Durval Carneiro
- Succeeded by: Nilo Moraes Coelho

Minister of Social Security
- In office 15 March 1985 – 13 February 1986
- Preceded by: Jarbas Passarinho
- Succeeded by: Raphael de Almeida Magalhães

Personal details
- Born: 21 October 1926 Acajutiba, Brazil
- Died: 22 June 2018 (aged 91) Salvador da Bahia, Brazil
- Party: PT, PSDB, PDT, PMDB, PSD
- Profession: Lawyer, Politician

Francisco Waldir Pires de Souza (21 October 1926 – 22 June 2018) was a Brazilian politician and professor. He served as the Minister of Defence under President Luiz Inácio Lula da Silva, before being fired for gross incompetence and inaction during Brazil's aviation crisis of 2006–2007. At the time of the crisis, he was accused by some in Brazil of nearing senility. He was replaced by former Supreme Court President Nelson Jobim. He presided over the Brazilian Mission to Haiti.

He taught constitutional law at the University of Brasília.
