= Embraer Legacy 600 =

Business jet

Legacy 600
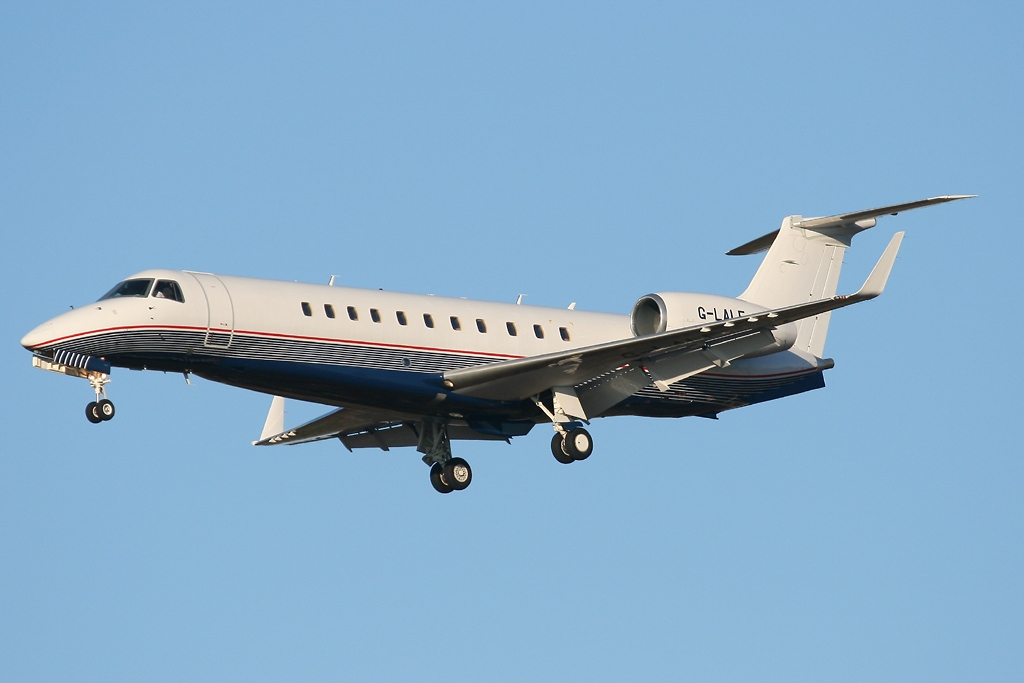
- Embraer Legacy 600, gear and flaps down

General information
- Type: Business jet
- National origin: Brazil
- Manufacturer: Embraer
- Status: In service
- Primary user: Vista Global
- Number built: 289 (as of 31 December 2020)

History
- Manufactured: 2002–2020
- Introduction date: February 2002
- First flight: 31 March 2001
- Developed from: Embraer ERJ family

The Embraer Legacy 600 is a business jet derivative of the Embraer ERJ family of commercial jet aircraft.

== Design and development ==
The Legacy 600 (market designation adopted after 2005) is based on the ERJ-135 model. It was launched in 2000 at the Farnborough Airshow as the "Legacy 2000". The Legacy carries 13 passengers in three partitioned sections for 3,050 nautical miles (5,650 km; 3,510 mi) or 8 passengers for 3,450 nautical miles (6,390 km; 3,970 mi). It features added range via extra fuel tanks in the tail behind the baggage compartment and forward of the wing, winglets, and an extensive drag reduction program. It is certified to 41,000 feet (12,000 m) altitude versus 37,000 feet (11,000 m) for the airline configuration. The Legacy Shuttle can seat 19 to 37 in airline-style seats but without the range.

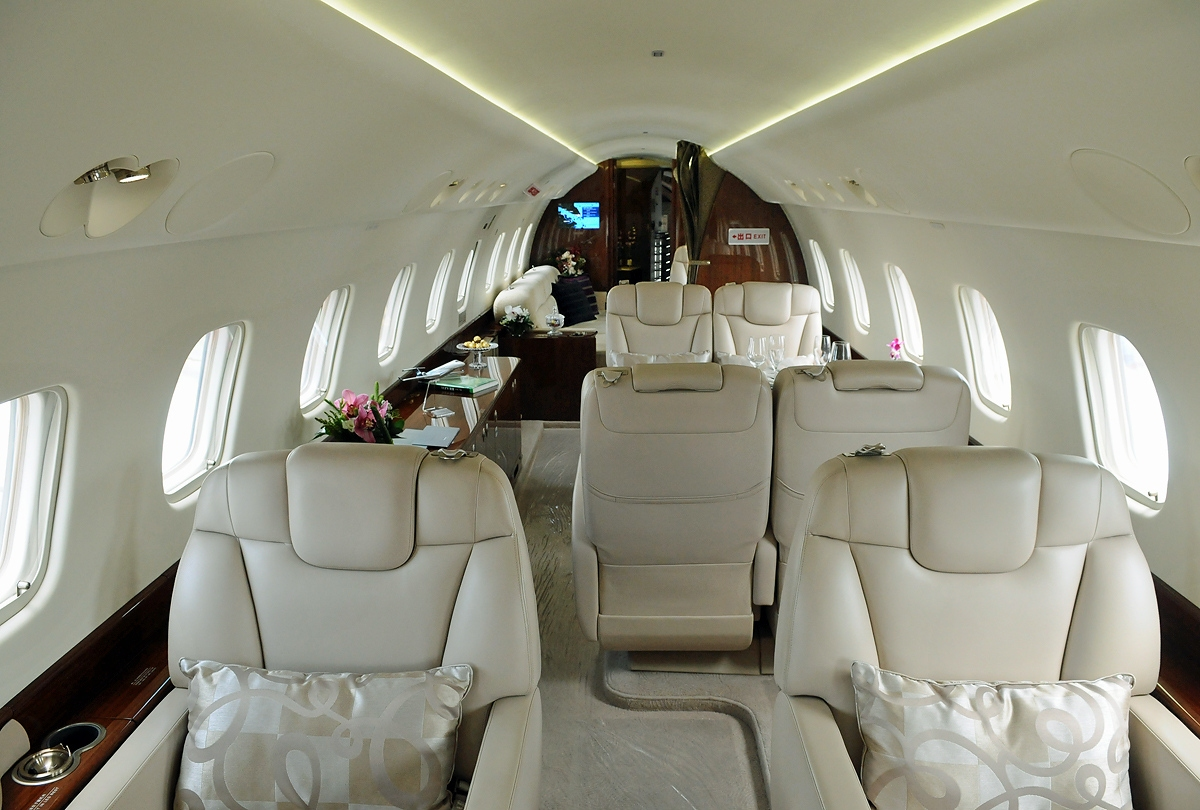
Legacy 650 interior

The first flight was made in June 2000, with the prototype of the ERJ-135 (PT-ZJA). This same aircraft was once the prototype of the first ERJ-145. New winglets and new wing-to-fuselage fairing was added, but no additional fuel tanks were available. The new fuselage fuel tanks were ready for the second prototype (PT-XJO), along with engine and avionics, that flew only in 31 March 2001. It was the second Embraer model to feature winglets, as the first were installed on the EMB-145SA military model. Embraer winglet models differed in shape and structure, due to their optimum design speed.

The Legacy 600 competes on the upper end of the small to mid-sized range of business jets and is considered a "Heavy Jet" aircraft. It has nearly the opposite design progression as the rival Canadair Challenger. The Legacy 600 was derived from the established ERJ family of regional jets, while the Canadair Regional Jet was developed by Bombardier from the Challenger business jet. Both lines of aircraft are competitors. Embraer has since launched an extensive lineup of business aircraft, from the entry-level Phenom 100 to the Lineage 1000, a bizliner version of the company's 100-seat E190.

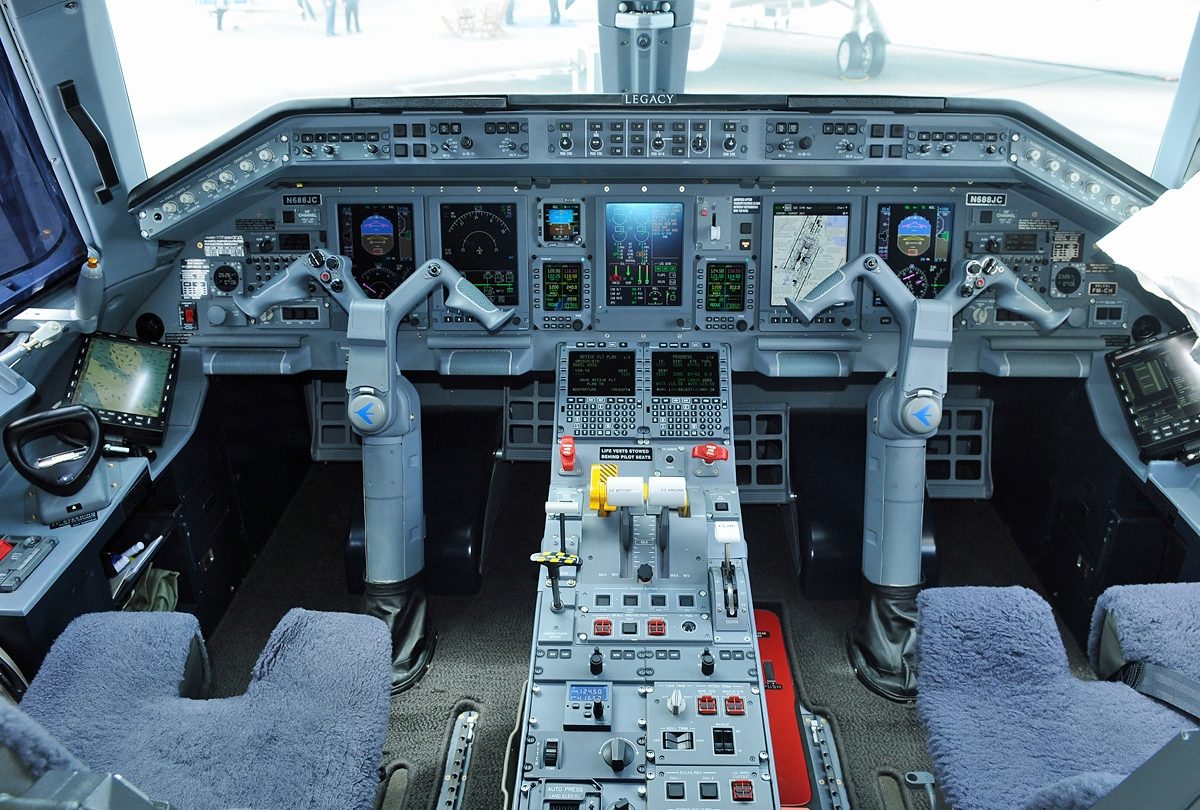
Legacy 600 Cockpit

With the updated Mark I cockpit of the EMB-145, the Legacy includes a Honeywell Primus Elite avionics suite glass cockpit.

US private aviation companies offering Legacy 600-family business jets for charter include Embraer Executive Jet Services, Clay Lacy Aviation, ExcelAire, Aircraft Services Group and Jet Edge International.

== Legacy 650 ==
Announced at the 2009 NBAA show, the Legacy 650 is a longer-range version of the Legacy 600, giving it a range capability of 3,900 nmi (7,220 km; 4,490 mi) non-stop with four passengers, or carry 2,500 lb (1,134 kg) more than the Legacy 600 for a 3,400 nmi (6,290 km; 3,910 mi) trip. It features also a lowered alley, with increased headroom. It was certified by the FAA in February 2011.

Embraer had a joint venture with Aviation Industry Corp. in China assembling Legacy 650a and ERJ-145s from 2004 to 2016.

An enhanced version, the 650E, was announced at the 2016 NBAA and scheduled for introduction in 2017. It includes a synthetic vision system and autothrottle as standard, a restyled three-zone interior and comes with a 10-year or 10,000-flight-hour warranty. In August 2020 Embraer announced that it was stopping sales of the Legacy 650.

== Accidents and incidents ==
On 29 September 2006, an ExcelAire Legacy 600 (aircraft registration N600XL) collided with Gol Transportes Aéreos Flight 1907, a Boeing 737-800, while cruising over Mato Grosso, Brazil. The Boeing aircraft's left wing was cut off in the collision and crashed, killing all 154 passengers and crew. The Embraer Legacy 600, despite serious damage to the left horizontal stabilizer and left winglet, was able to continue flying and landed at Cachimbo Air Force Base, with no fatalities.

On 23 August 2023, a Legacy 600 belonging to the military Wagner Group crashed in a field near Kuzhenkino, Tver Oblast, Russia. According to Russian officials, all 10 people aboard, 3 crew members and 7 passengers, including Yevgeny Prigozhin and Dmitry Utkin, were killed. DNA tests subsequently confirmed human remains recovered from the crash site exactly matched the flight's passenger manifest. Prigozhin was additionally identified by a partially severed finger on his left hand. Embraer stated they had not serviced the aircraft since 2019 due to international sanctions against the Wagner Group. US intelligence reported that an intentional explosion caused the aircraft to crash.

== Aircraft deliveries ==
Year	2002	2003	2004	2005	2006	2007	2008	2009	2010	2011	2012	2013	2014	2015	2016	2017	2018	2019	2020	total
Deliveries	8	13	13	20	27	36	36	18	11	13	17	21	18	12	9	7	4	5	1	289

== Specifications ==
Variant	Legacy 600	Legacy 650
Crew	Two pilots	
Passengers	13 or 14	
Baggage Capacity	286 cu ft (8.1 m^{3})	
Length	86 ft 5 in (26.33 m)	
Wingspan	69 ft 5 in (21.17 m)	
Height	21 ft 9 in (6.64 m)	
MTOW	49,604 lb (22,500 kg)	53,572 lb (24,300 kg)
BOW	30,081 lb (13,645 kg)	31,217 lb (14,160 kg)
Max Fuel	18,170 lb (8,240 kg)	20,600 lb (9,300 kg)
Max. Payload	5,193 lb (2,356 kg)	4,939 lb (2,240 kg)
Engines (2×)	Rolls-Royce AE 3007A1E	Rolls-Royce AE 3007A2
Thrust (2×)	7,953 lbf (35.38 kN), ISA+22°C	9,020 lbf (40.1 kN), ISA+15°C
Ceiling	41,000 ft (12,000 m)	
Range (Note: 4 pax, LRC, NBAA IFR res.)	3,400 nmi (6,300 km; 3,900 mi)	3,900 nmi (7,200 km; 4,500 mi)
Cruise	Mach 0.78 (447 kn; 829 km/h; 515 mph) at 41,000 ft (12,000 m)	
Maximum Speed	Mach 0.80 (459 kn; 850 km/h; 528 mph) at 41,000 ft (12,000 m)	
Takeoff (MTOW, SL, ISA)	5,614 ft (1,711 m)	5,741 ft (1,750 m)
Landing (Typical LW, SL, ISA)	2,685 ft (818 m)	2,842 ft (866 m)
Avionics	Honeywell Primus Elite	

== See also ==
Related development

- Embraer ERJ 145 family

Aircraft of comparable role, configuration, and era

- Gulfstream G280
- Bombardier Challenger 350
- Bombardier Challenger 650
- Bombardier Challenger 850
- Dassault Falcon 2000

Related lists

- List of civil aircraft
