= Present serviceability index =

Pavement performance measure

The present serviceability index (PSI) is a pavement performance measure. Introduced by the American Association of State Highway and Transportation Officials (AASHTO), the PSI is one of the most widely used pavement performance indicators after pavement condition index (PCI) and international roughness index (IRI). This performance indicator ranges between 0 and 5, 0 representing a failed pavement and 5 an excellent one. Since the PSI entails slope variance, it is correlated with performance indicators related to roughness such as IRI.

== History ==
The PSI was developed based on the AASHO Road Test's present serviceability rating (PSR). AASHO Road Test was a set of experiments carried out by the AASHTO from 1956 to 1961. Unlike the PSR, which was a ride quality rating that required a panel of observers to ride in a car over the pavement of interest, the PSI does not require a panel of experts. Therefore, it was a more practical approach for large-scale pavement networks.

== Calculation ==
Present serviceability is a function of several variables. For flexible pavement these variables include:

- Slope variance (SV)
- Depth of rut (RD)
- Cracking and patching (C+P)
