= Crocodile cracking =

Distress in asphalt pavement

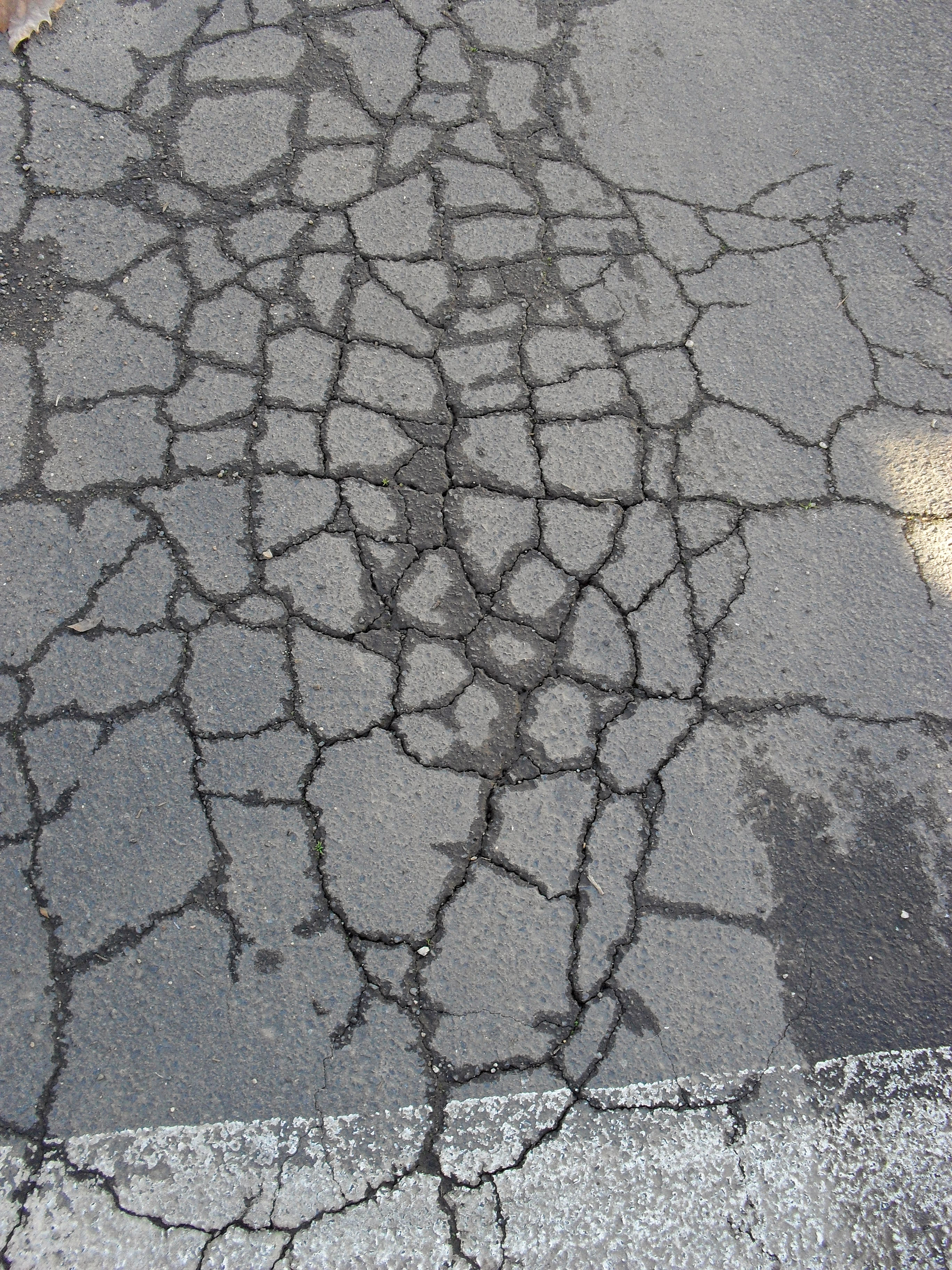
An example of moderate to severe crocodile cracking.

Crocodile cracking (also called alligator cracking and perhaps misleadingly fatigue cracking) is a common type of distress in asphalt pavement. The following is more closely related to fatigue cracking which is characterized by interconnecting or interlaced cracking in the asphalt layer resembling the hide of a crocodile. Cell sizes can vary in size up to 300 millimetres (12 in) across, but are typically less than 150 millimetres (5.9 in) across. Fatigue cracking is generally a loading failure, but numerous factors can contribute to it. It is often a sign of sub-base failure, poor drainage, or repeated over-loadings. It is important to prevent fatigue cracking, and repair as soon as possible, as advanced cases can be very costly to repair and can lead to formation of potholes or premature pavement failure.

It is usually studied under the transportation section of civil engineering.

== Causes ==
Fatigue cracking is an asphalt pavement distress most often instigated by failure of the surface due to traffic loading. However, fatigue cracking can be greatly influenced by environmental and other effects while traffic loading remains the direct cause. Frequently, overloading happens because the base or subbase inadequately support the surface layer and subsequently cannot handle loads that it would normally endure. There are many ways that the subbase or base can be weakened.

Poor drainage in the road bed is a frequent cause of this degradation of the base or subgrade. A heavy spring thaw, similarly to poor drainage, can weaken the base course, leading to fatigue cracking.

Stripping or raveling is another possible cause of fatigue cracking. Stripping occurs when poor adhesion between asphalt and aggregate allows the aggregate at the surface to dislodge. If left uncorrected, this reduces the thickness of the pavement, reducing the affected portion's ability to carry its designed loading. This can cause fatigue cracking to develop rapidly, as overloading will happen with loads of less magnitude or frequency.

Edge cracking is the formation of crescent-shaped cracks near the edge of a road. It is caused by lack of support of the road edge, sometimes due to poorly drained or weak shoulders. If left untreated, additional cracks will form until it resembles fatigue cracking. Like wheel-path fatigue cracking, poor drainage is a main cause of edge cracking, as it weakens the base, which hastens the deterioration of the pavement. Water ponding (a buildup of water which can also be called puddling) happens more frequently near the edge than in the center of the road path, as roads are usually sloped to prevent in-lane ponding. This leads to excess moisture in the shoulders and subbase at the road edge. Edge cracking differs from fatigue cracking in that the cracks form from the top down, whereas fatigue cracks usually start at the bottom and propagate to the surface.

== Development ==
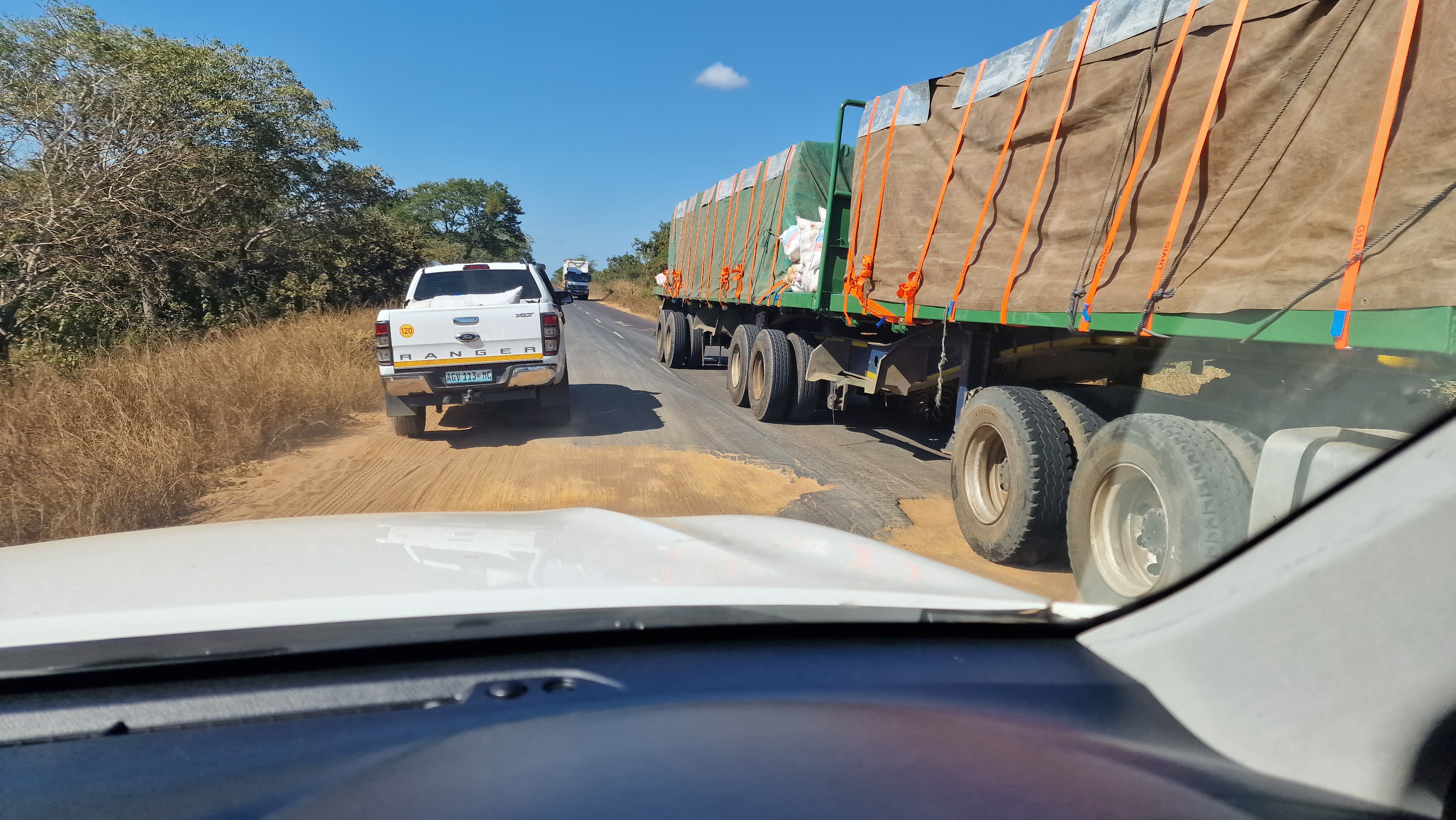
Severe pothole damage resulting from advanced fatigue cracking

Fatigue cracking manifests itself initially as longitudinal cracking (cracks along the direction of the flow of traffic) in the top layer of the asphalt. These cracks are initially thin and sparsely distributed. If further deterioration is allowed, these longitudinal cracks are connected by transverse cracks to form sharp sided, prismatic pieces. This interlaced cracking pattern resembles the scales on the back of a crocodile or alligator, hence the nickname, crocodile cracking.

More severe cases involve pumping of fines, spalling, and loose pieces of pavement. The most severe cases of fatigue cracking often occur with other pavement distresses, but are exemplified by: potholes, large cracks (3/8" or larger), and severely spalled edges.

== Measurement and quantification ==
There are many different ways to measure fatigue cracking, but in general a pavement distress manual or index will be used. For example, the Pavement Condition Index is widely used to quantify the overall level of distress and condition of a section of road. Measurement of fatigue cracking specifically (and pavement distress in general) is necessary to determine the overall condition of a road, and for determination of a time-line for rehabilitation and/or repair. There are many other rating systems, and many rating systems currently in use are based on the AASHO Road Test.

There are two important criteria to take into account when measuring fatigue cracking. The first is the extent of the cracking. This is the amount of road surface area which is affected by this pavement distress. The second criterion is the severity of the cracking. Severity, which has been discussed above, refers to how far the cracking has progressed, and is often directly a function of crack width. Severity may be rated numerically, or given a rating from "low" to "severe". The rating may be entered into a pavement management system, which will suggest a priority and method for the repair.

Systems have been developed that detect fatigue cracking and other types of pavement distress automatically. They measure the severity and frequency of alligator cracking on the road-path. One such machine is the road surface profilometer, which is mounted on a vehicle and measures the profile of the road surface while it is moving down the roadway.

== Prevention and repair ==
Preventing fatigue cracking can be as simple as preventing the common causes. For example, reducing overloading on an asphalt pavement or improving drainage can prevent fatigue cracking in many cases. Prevention primarily depends on designing and constructing the pavement and subbase to support the expected traffic loads, and providing good drainage to keep water out of the subbase.

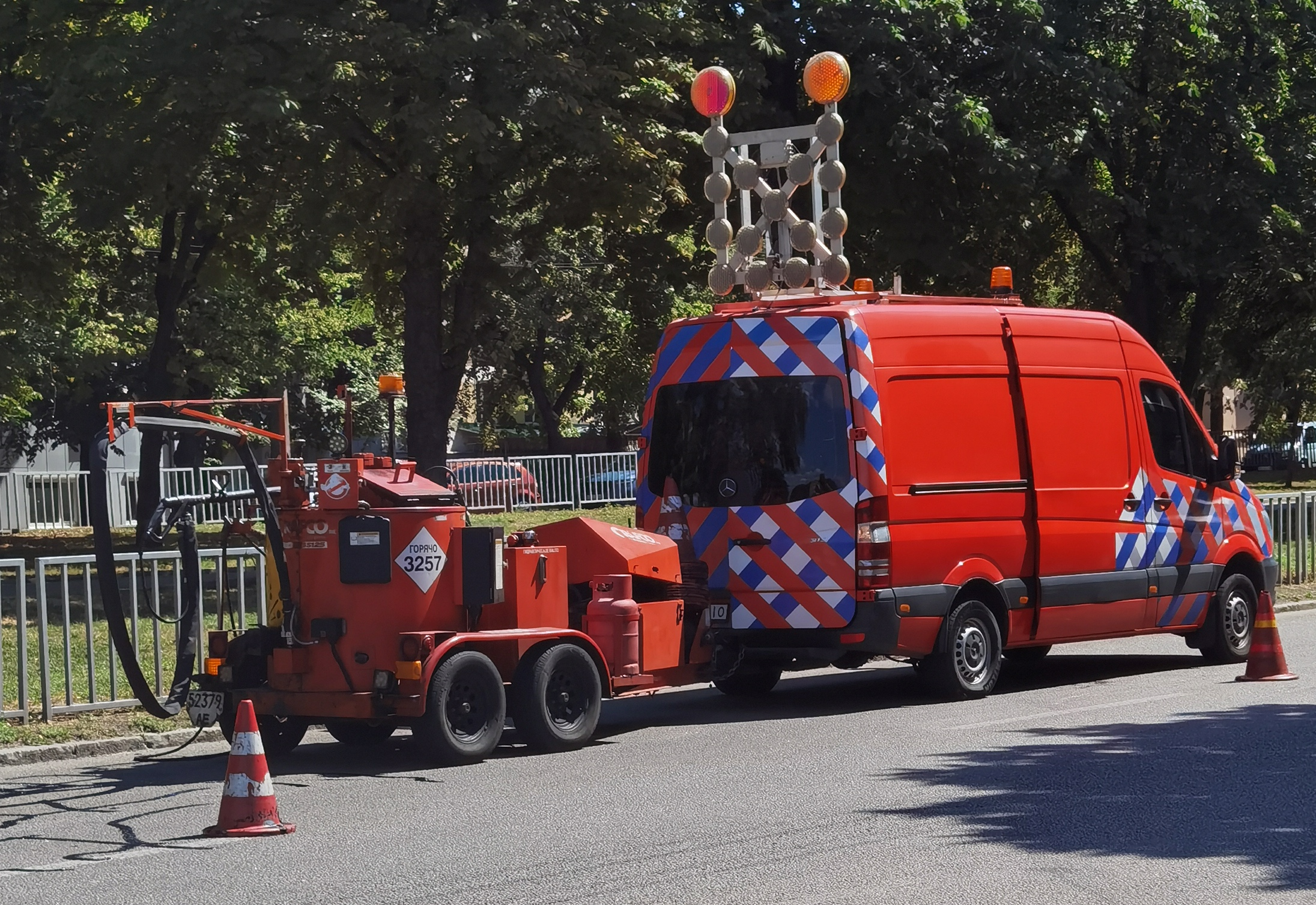
Crack sealing machine in Dnipro, Ukraine.

A good strategy to prevent overloading, which is a main cause of fatigue cracking, is to increase the depth of the asphalt layer. According to certain researchers, pavements that exceed a certain minimum strength or thickness can hypothetically handle infinitely many loads without showing structural defects, including fatigue cracking. These pavements are called perpetual pavements or long-term performance pavements (LTPP).

When repairing pavement affected by fatigue cracking, the main cause of the distress should be determined. However, often the specific cause is fairly difficult to determine, and prevention is therefore correspondingly difficult. Any investigation should involve digging a pit or coring the pavement and subbase to determine the pavement's structural makeup as well as determining whether or not subsurface moisture is a contributing factor. The repair needed also differs based on the severity and extent of the cracking.

For minor cracks, preventative crack filling is a good procedure that can help prevent future potholes from forming.

In the early stages, sealing cracks with crack sealant limits further deterioration of the subgrade due to moisture penetration. Small areas may be repaired by removal of the affected area, and replacement with new base and asphalt surface. Once the damage has progressed or the affected area is large and extensive, a structural asphalt overlay or complete reconstruction is necessary to ensure structural integrity. Proper repair may include first sealing cracks with crack sealant, installing paving fabric over a tack coat, or milling the damaged asphalt. An overlay of hot mix asphalt is then placed over the completed repair and final sealcoating.

== See also ==
- Alkali–silica reaction: distress in concrete with a cracking pattern ressembing this of crocodile cracking
- Bleeding (roads)
- Cracking pattern
- Road texture
- Rut (roads)
