= Pavement performance modeling =

Study of pavement deterioration

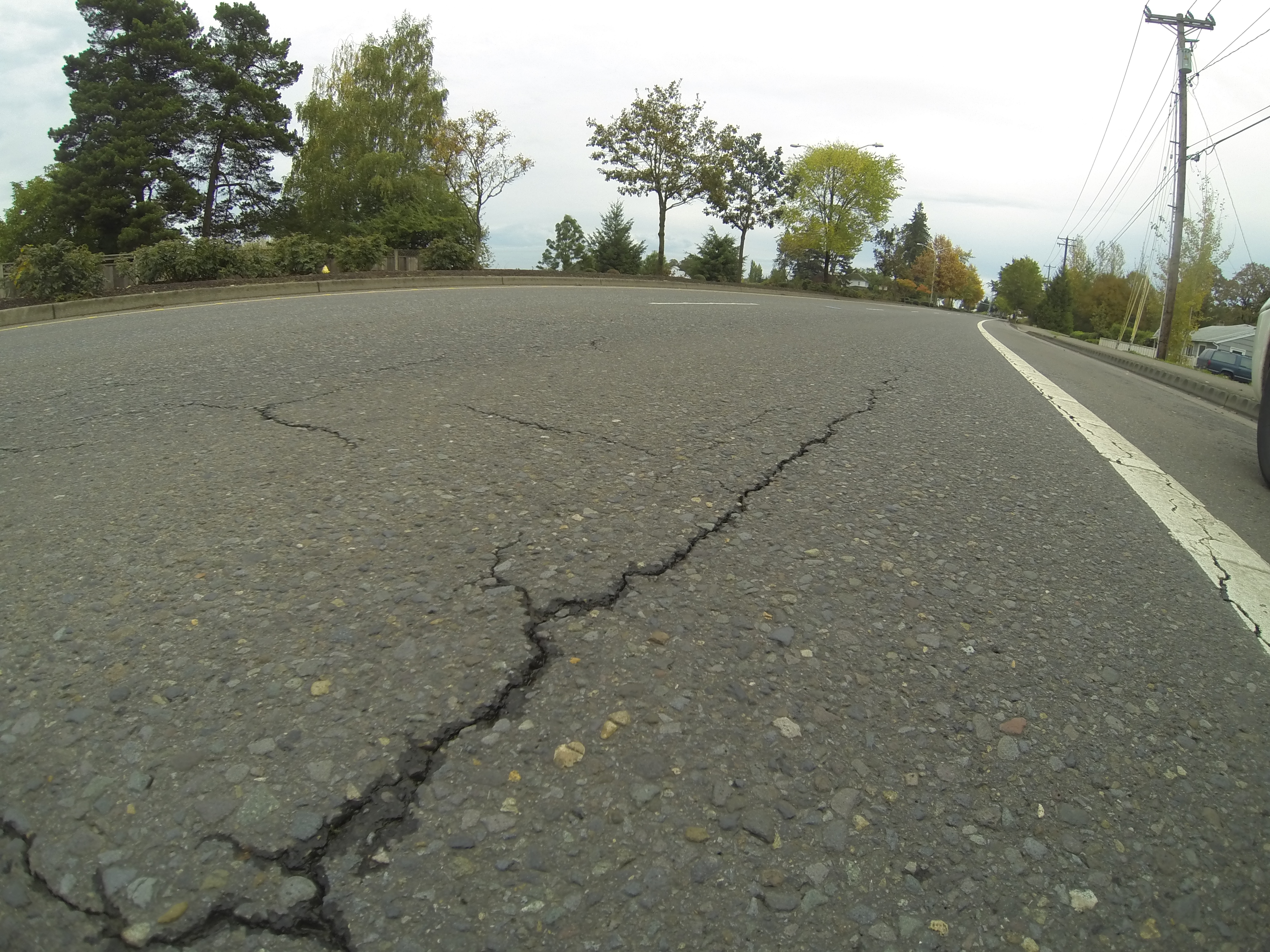
Pavement performance models could be developed to predict a single distress such as a crack or the aggregate pavement condition index.

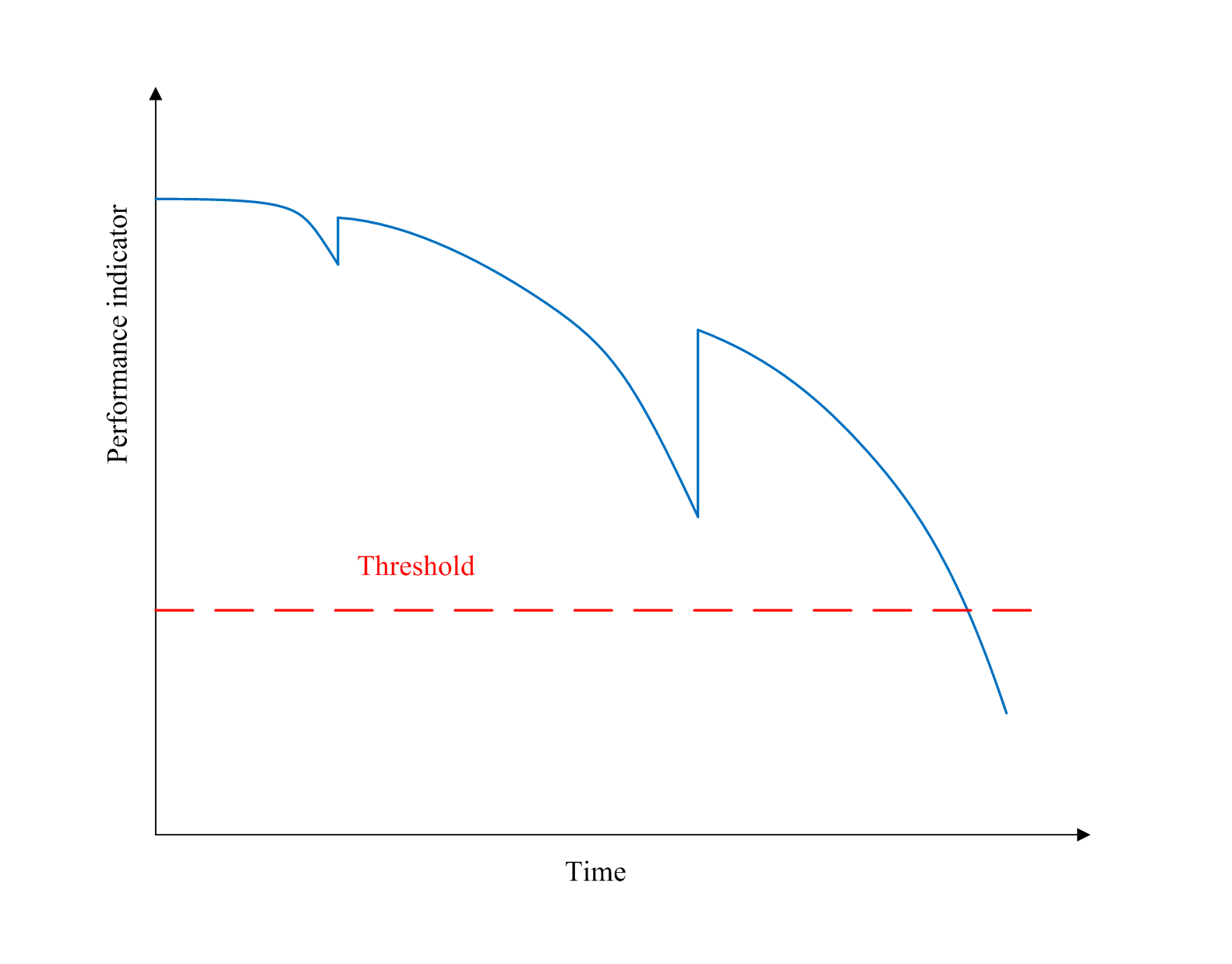
Schematic deterioration of the condition of a road over time

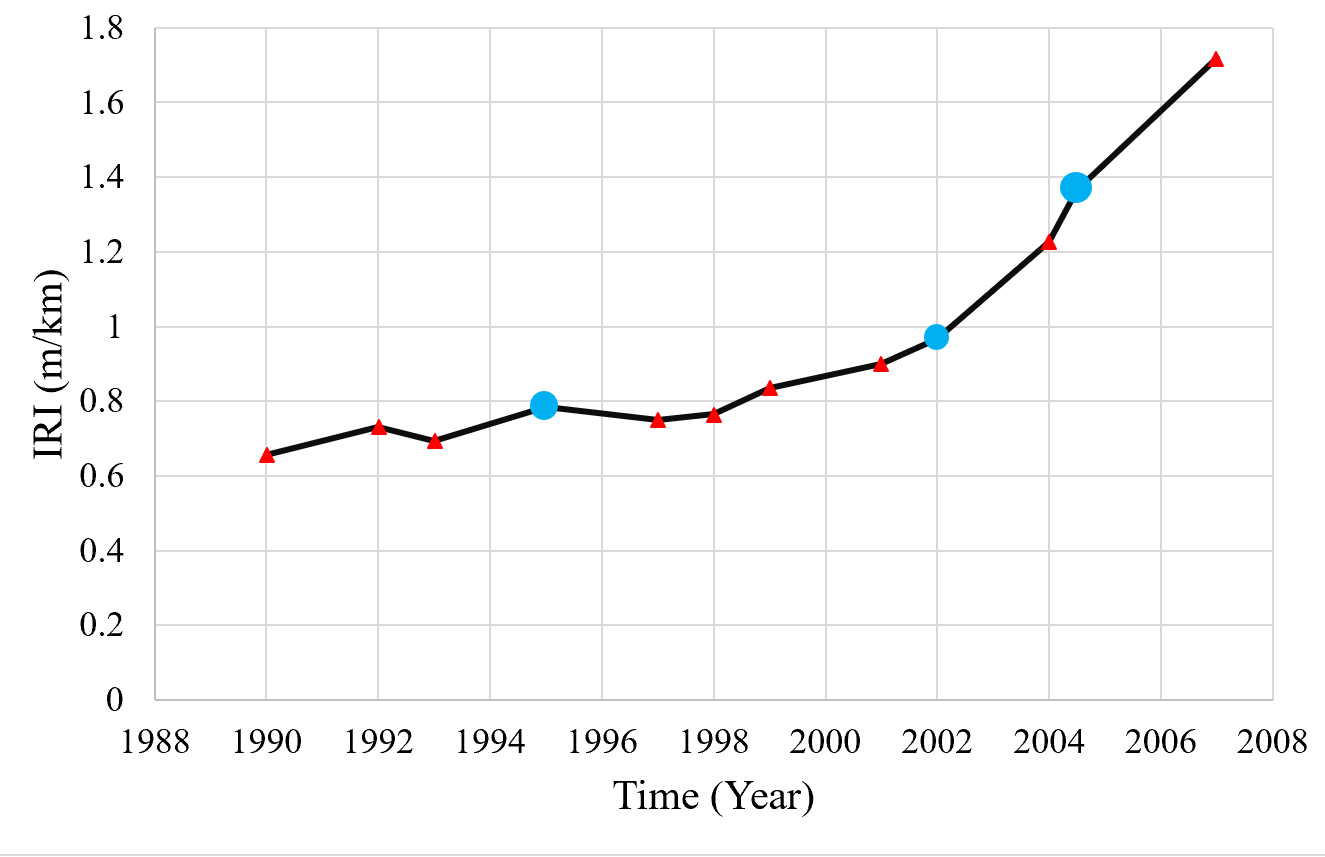
The increase in the IRI of a road in Texas. The blue dots on the curve represent maintenance actions.

Pavement performance modeling or pavement deterioration modeling is the study of pavement deterioration throughout its life-cycle. The health of pavement is assessed using different performance indicators. Some of the most well-known performance indicators are Pavement Condition Index (PCI), International Roughness Index (IRI) and Present Serviceability Index (PSI), but sometimes a single distress such as rutting or the extent of crack is used. Among the most frequently used methods for pavement performance modeling are mechanistic models, mechanistic-empirical models, survival curves and Markov models. Recently, machine learning algorithms have been used for this purpose as well. Most studies on pavement performance modeling are based on IRI.

== History ==
The study of pavement performance goes back to the first half of 20th century. The first efforts in pavement performance modeling were based on mechanistic models. Later researchers also developed empirical models, which were not based on the structure of the pavement. Since the beginning of 1990s mechanistic-empirical (M-E) models have become popular. These models combined both mechanistic and empirical features via linear regression. In North America, AASHTO developed a guideline based on mechanistic-empirical methods.

Development of such models required data. Therefore, in North America, organizations such as AASHTO and FHWA collected large amounts of data about pavement conditions. Examples of these databases, which are used for pavement design and performance measurement, are the LTPP and AASHO Road Test.

== Causes of deterioration ==
The deterioration of roads is a complex phenomenon and is influenced by many factors. These factors can be classified into a few categories: design and construction, material type, environmental conditions, and managerial and operational factors.

=== Climate and environmental conditions ===
Among the most significant environmental factors are freeze-thaw cycles, maximum and minimum temperature and precipitation. It is reported that on average roads in a wet climate with freeze cycles deteriorate up to two times more than roads in dry and no-freeze regions. So, roads exposed to larger number of freeze-thaw cycles and higher precipitation levels deteriorate faster. On the other hand, roads in dry and no freeze climates last longer. A very high temperature can be detrimental to asphalt pavement too and cause distresses such as bleeding. Considering this, climate change could pose a threat to the well-being of roads. Its impact, however, varies based on regions. While it can be highly detrimental to roads in a certain area it might alleviate the deterioration of roads in another area.

=== Traffic and operational conditions ===
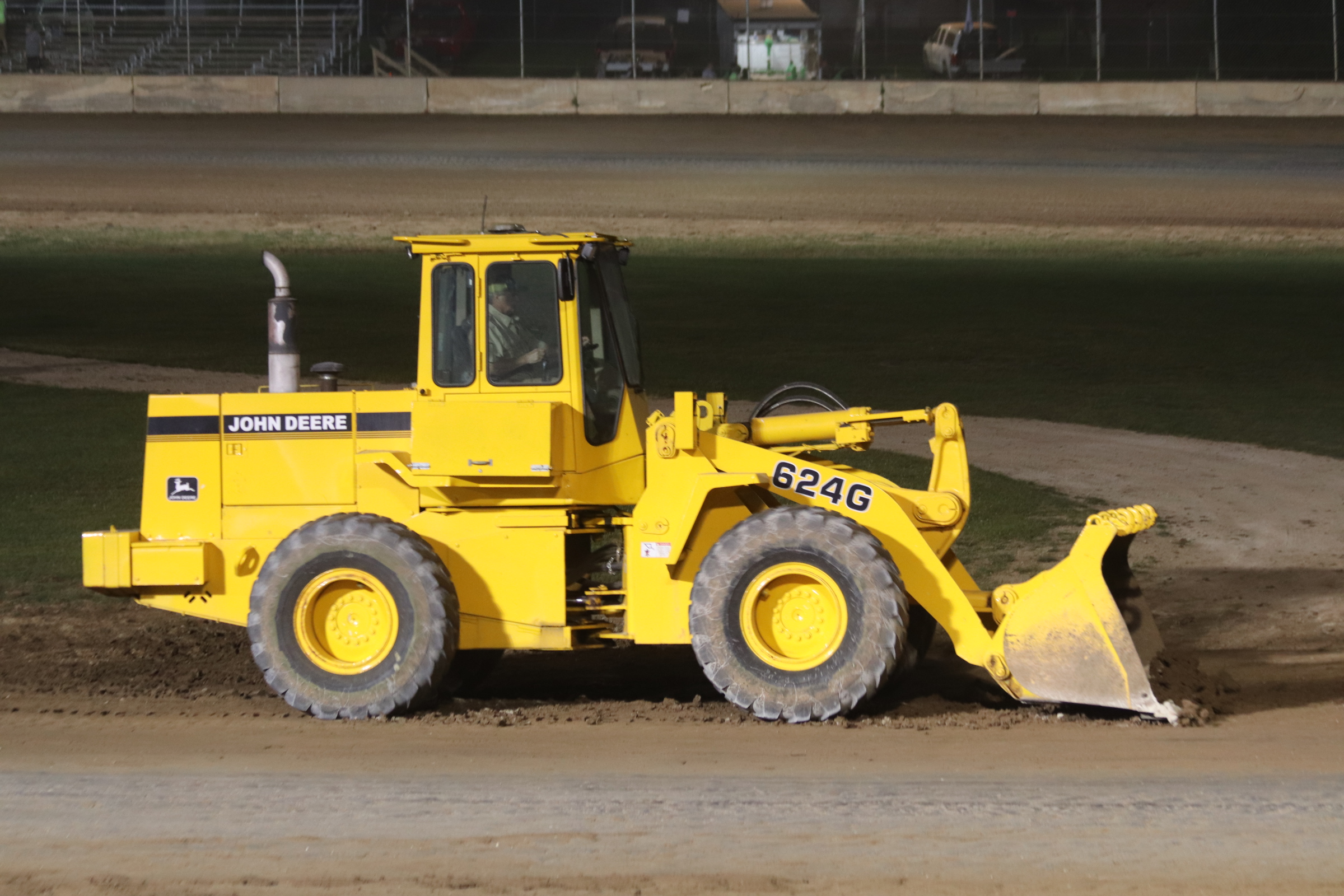
Resurfacing of a granular race track following an auto race.

The traffic count and the type of traffic are among the important operational attributes. Usually larger volumes of traffic and heavier vehicles such as trucks are correlated with faster pavement degradation. Also managerial approaches can have an important influence on deterioration patterns. Examples of the factors directly related to management are the type and frequency of maintenance or cleaning and deicing approaches in the winter. Using too much of deicing salt can exacerbate the corrosion problem especially in concrete pavement.

=== Type of pavement ===
The type of pavement is one of the most important factors affecting pavement deterioration. Generally concrete pavements are more durable in warmer climates, and asphalt pavements are more resilient against cold weather. The joints in concrete pavement is another source of issue. In a certain type of road (concrete, asphalt or gravel), the thickness of layers and type of materials used in base, sub-base and pavement layer matters. Sometimes these attributes are expressed via an aggregated measure called granular base equivalence (GBE).
