= Fourth power law =

Rule in road engineering

The fourth power law (also known as the fourth power rule) is a rule of thumb which states that the damage to the road caused by a motor vehicle increases in proportion to the fourth power of its axle load. This law was discovered in the course of a series of scientific experiments in the United States in the late 1950s and was decisive for the development of standard construction methods in road construction.

A 1988 report by the Australian Road Research Board stated that the rule is a good approximation for rutting damage, but an exponent of 2 (rather than 4) is more appropriate to estimate fatigue cracking.

A 2017 report commissioned by the New Zealand Transport Agency found a wide variation in the best-fitting exponents for a power law on 4T axle loads vs 6T axle loads, depending on the current condition and type of the roading. As a very rough summary of its highly detailed findings: A 9th-power law is most predictive when the road is barely able to withstand the 6T load; and the per-crossing damage is roughly linear to axle-weight when the pavement is able to withstand much higher loads than 6T per axle.

== Background ==
At the beginning of the 1950s, the American Association of State Highway Officials (AASHO) dealt with the question of how the size of the axle load affects the service life of a road pavement. For this purpose, a test track was built in Ottawa, Illinois, which consisted of six loops, each with two lanes. The lanes were paved with both asphalt and concrete of varying thicknesses. In the two-year test, trucks with different axle loads then drove the roads almost continuously. The test was called the AASHO Road Test.

When evaluating the series of tests, it was found that there is a connection between the thickness of the pavement, the number of load transfers and the axle load, and that these have a direct effect on the service life and condition of a road. The service life of the road is thereby reduced with approximately the fourth power of the axle load. The accuracy of the law of the fourth power is disputed among experts, since the test results depend on many other factors, such as climatic conditions, in addition to the factors mentioned above.

== Calculation examples ==
This example illustrates how a car and a truck affect the surface of a road differently according to the fourth power law.

- Car (total weight 2 tonnes, 2 axles): load per axle: 1 tonnes
- Truck (total weight 30 tonnes, 3 axles): load per axle: 10 tonnes

$10^4=10\cdot10\cdot10\cdot10=10,000$ times as large

The load on the road from one axle (2 wheels) is 10 times greater for a truck than for a car. However, the fourth power law says that the damage to the road may be estimated by this ratio raised to the fourth power. Since the truck has three axles, this value is tripled, but since the car has two axles, the comparison value is reduced by half. Therefore, if the fourth power law is valid over this range of axle loadings on this particular stretch of roading, the resulting damage differential between truck and car is 15,000 to 1.

== Range of Validity ==
The relationship of pavement stress and strain to roading damage is quite complex. Roading engineers do not rely blindly on a power law to estimate maintenance costs and intervals, but instead rely on complex models with many factors, notably including a pavement structural number (SNP) to describe the strength of the pavement. Pavement that is strong enough to be deformed only slightly by the crossing of a heavy vehicle will "bounce back" to a flat surface. However repeated deformations will cause rutting. Rutting worsens at a rate that depends on other important factors, such as the temperature of the pavement and the construction of its subsurface. Any rutting causes additional stress to be put on the pavement from each vehicle crossing. From an engineer's perspective, the fourth power law is thus at most a rough predictor of the number of vehicle crossings that a pavement will withstand, before it is so heavily rutted that it'll require maintenance. Such a rule-of-thumb predictor is valid for a relatively narrow range of roads and axle loadings. Accordingly, the New Zealand Transport Agency engaged experts to determine whether the fourth power law was valid for purposes of setting Road User Charges (RUC) for heavy transport which exceeds the current load limits on its State Highway system.

At present (2005) Road User Charges (RUCs) are based on the fourth power law, which was developed from the AASHO road test in the United States in the 1950s. The pavements and vehicles used for that test differ considerably from those in use in New Zealand today.

In response to possibly inevitable increases in mass limits of heavy vehicles on New Zealand roads, a four-year research study (between 2001 and 2004) at the Canterbury Accelerated Pavement Testing Indoor Facility (CAPTIF, Christchurch, New Zealand), was undertaken...

- The most appropriate damage law exponent for use in RUCs should be the same value as determined from the SNP [pavement structural number] used for pavement design.
- If mass limits are increased, the damage law exponent value may be reduced from the current value of 4 for specific routes which have relatively high strength pavements. This reduction could be incorporated when assigning RUCs for vehicles which can employ the increase in mass limits.
- For the same reasons, damage law exponents for low-strength low-volume roads could increase.

== See also ==
- Pavement engineering
- Pavement performance modeling
