= Granular base equivalency =

Measure of road pavement thickness

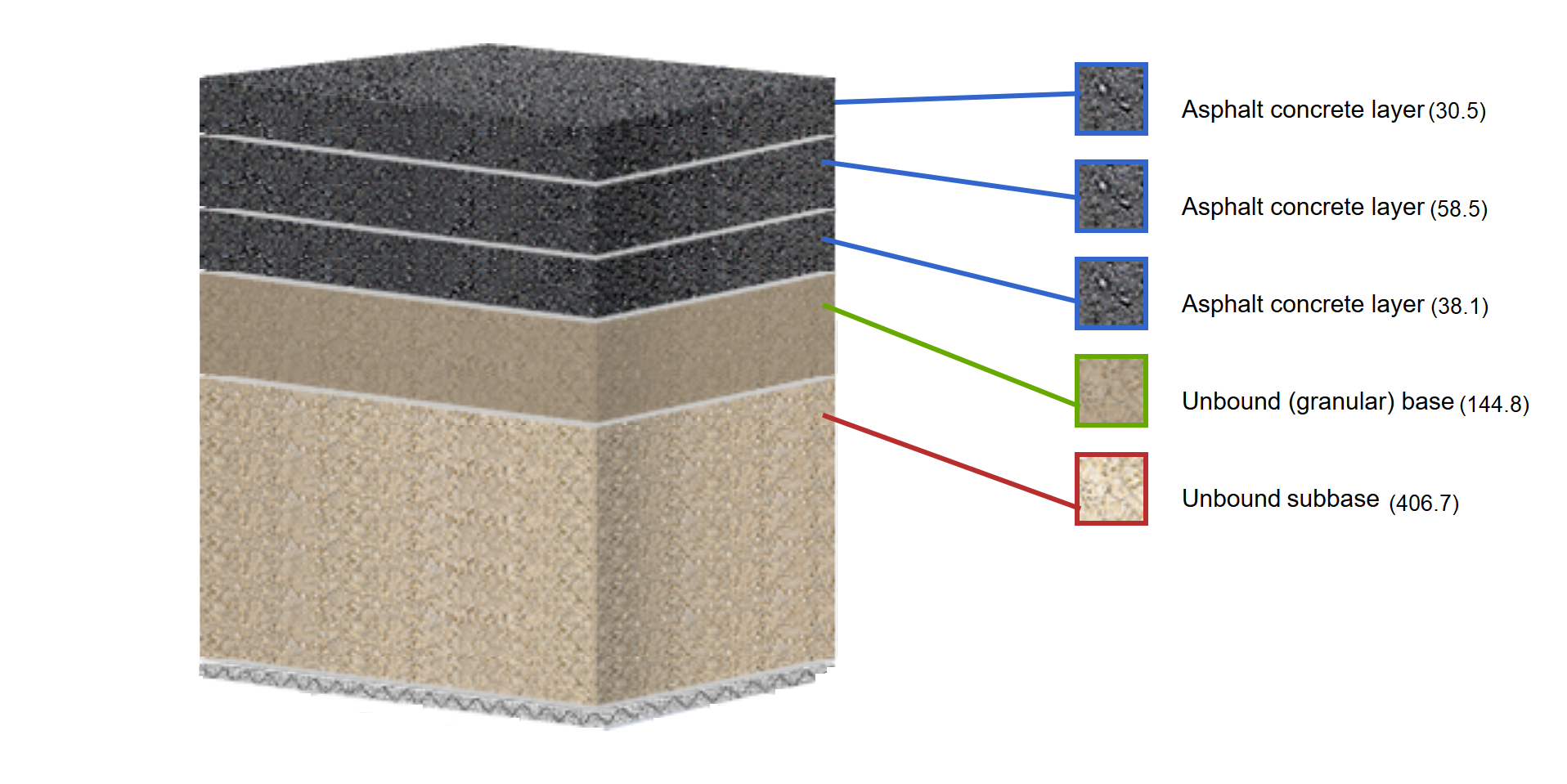
Profile of pavement showing the different layers of material in a certain road in Ontario. The thickness of these layers can be translated to GBE.

Granular base equivalency or granular base equivalence (GBE) is a measure of total pavement thickness. Since pavement is composed of multiple layers with different physical properties, its total thickness is measured by GBE. GBE translates the thickness of different road layers to a number using a set of coefficients. So, to calculate the GBE, the depth of each layer should be multiplied by the granular equivalency factor for the material in that layer. In the next step the sum of the converted layer thicknesses is calculated. This sum is called granular base equivalency, which is a popular and important measure in pavement design and pavement performance modeling.

== Example ==
Here is an example of GBE calculation adopted from Piryonesi (2019). This example belongs to a road in the LTPP database. This road is made of the following layers: subbase, base, and three layers of hot mixed asphalt concrete. Their thicknesses are given in millimeters in the following table. The total GBE for this road 805.7 millimeters.

Layer	Thickness (mm)	Conversion coefficient	Equivalent thickness or GBE (mm)
Hot mixed asphalt	30.5	2	61.0
Hot mixed asphalt	58.5	2	117.0
Hot mixed asphalt	38.1	2	76.2
Base	144.8	1	144.8
Subbase	607.1	0.67	406.7
Total	-	-	805.7
