= Deterioration modeling =

Engineering formula

The bathtub curve hazard function (blue, upper solid line) is a combination of a decreasing hazard of early failure (red dotted line) and an increasing hazard of wear-out failure (yellow dotted line), plus some constant hazard of random failure (green, lower solid line).

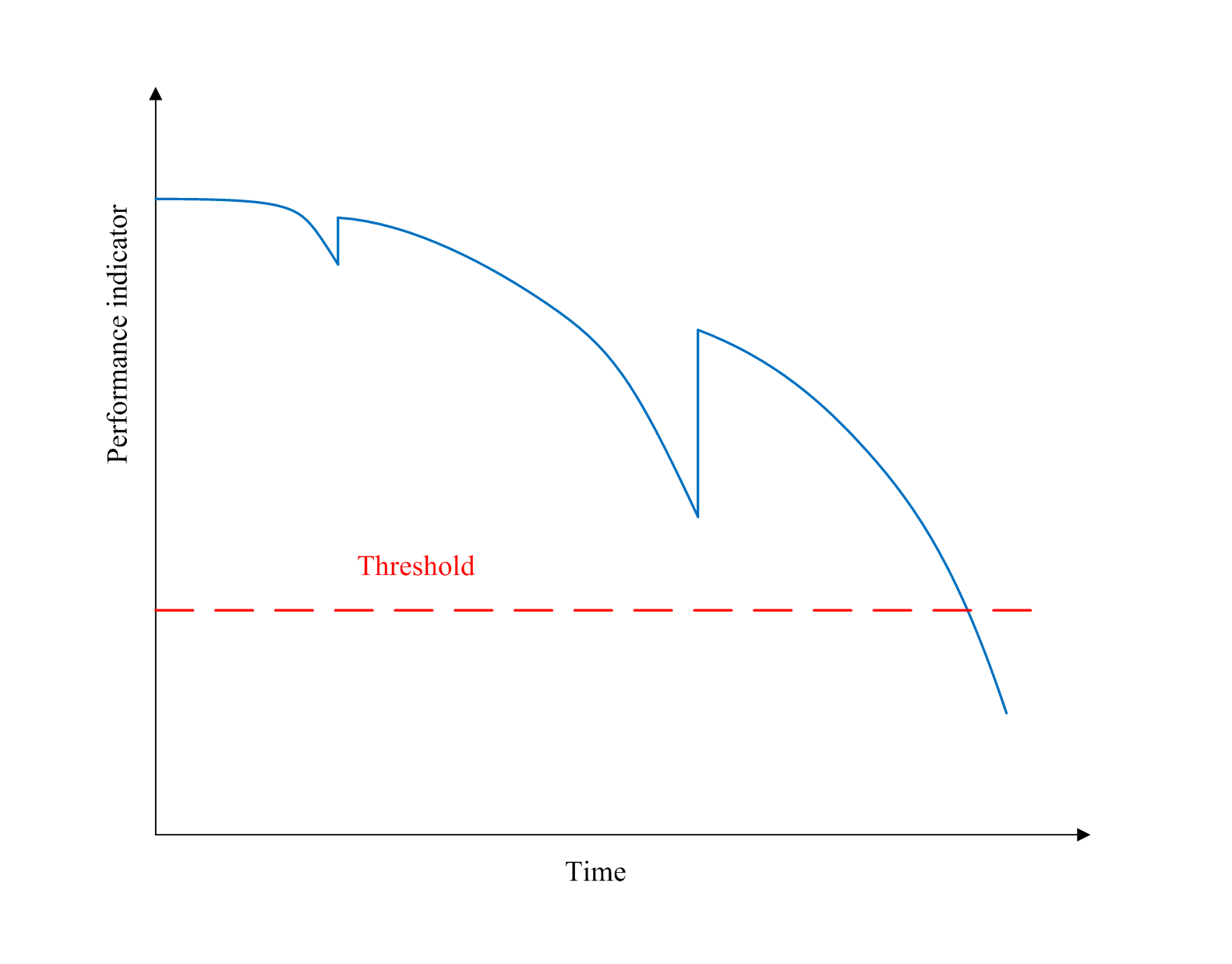
Schematic deterioration of an asset over time. The increase in performance indicators represent a maintenance action.

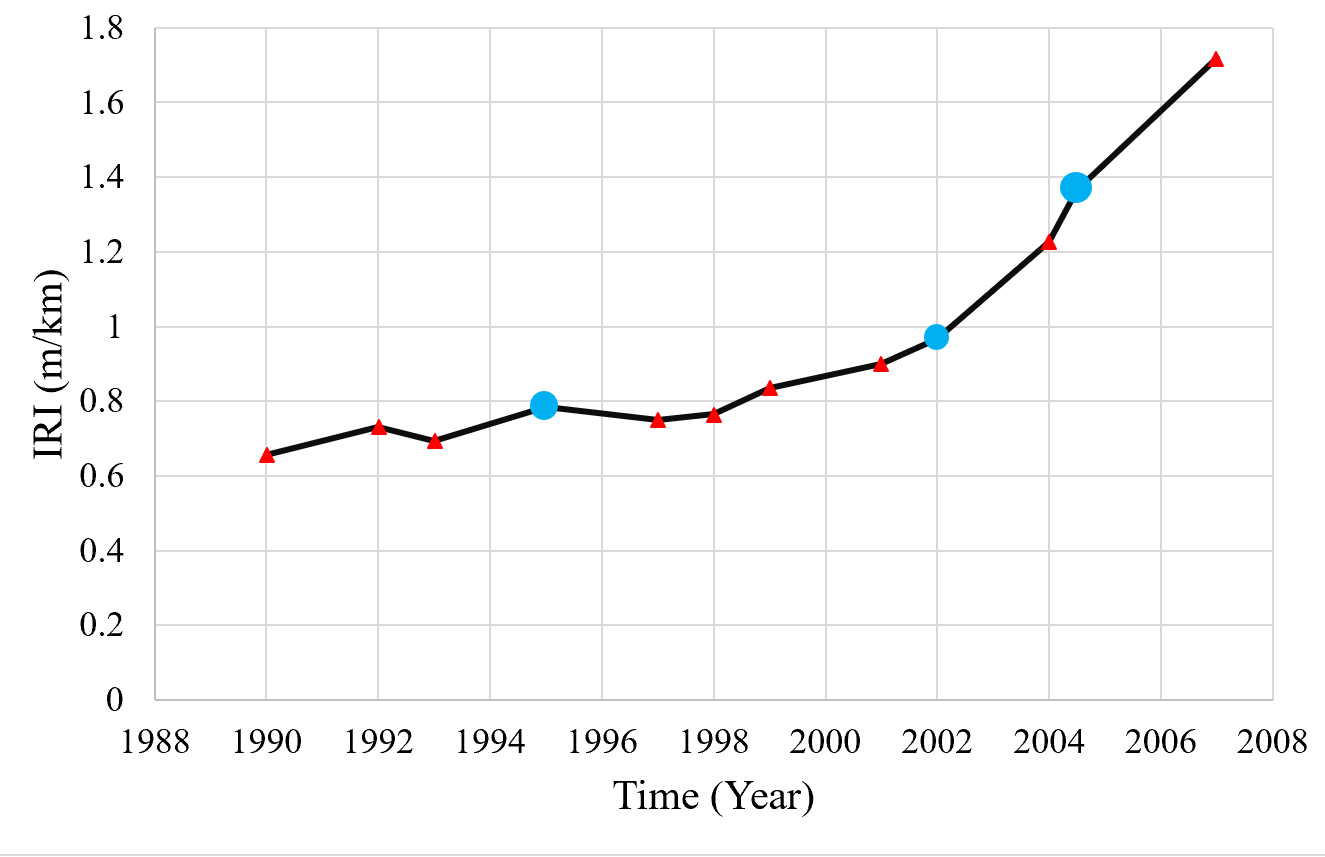
A road deteriorates over time, and its surface roughness increases. The road is located in Texas.

Deterioration modeling is the process of modeling and predicting the physical conditions of equipment, structures, infrastructure or any other physical assets. The condition of infrastructure is represented either using a deterministic index or the probability of failure. Examples of such performance measures are pavement condition index for roads or bridge condition index for bridges. For probabilistic measures, which are the focus of reliability theory, probability of failure or reliability index are used. Deterioration models are instrumental to infrastructure asset management and are the basis for maintenance and rehabilitation decision-making. The condition of all physical infrastructure degrade over time. A deterioration model can help decision-makers to understand how fast the condition drops or violates a certain threshold.

Traditionally, most municipalities have been using deterioration curves for deterioration modeling. Recently, more complex methods based on simulation, Markov models and machine learning models have been introduced. A well-known model to show the probability of failure of an asset throughout its life is called bathtub curve. This curve is made of three main stages: infant failure, constant failure, and wear out failure. In infrastructure asset management the dominant mode of deterioration is because of aging, traffic, and climatic attribute. Therefore, the wear out failure is of most concern.

== Types of deterioration models ==
Deterioration models are either deterministic or probabilistic. Deterministic models cannot entertain probabilities. Probabilistic models, however, can predict both the future condition and the probability of being in that certain condition.

=== Deterministic models ===
Deterministic models are simple and intelligible, but cannot incorporate probabilities. Deterioration curves solely developed based on age are an example of deterministic deterioration models. Traditionally, most mechanistic and mechanistic-empirical models are developed using deterministic approaches, but more recently researchers and practitioners have become interested in probabilistic models.

=== Probabilistic models ===
Examples of probabilistic deterioration models are the models developed based on reliability theory, Markov chain and machine learning. Unlike deterministic models a probabilistic model can incorporate probability. For instance, it can tell that in five years a road is going to be in a Poor condition with a probability of 75%, and there is a 25% probability that it will stay in a fair condition. Such probabilities are vital to the development of risk assessment models. If a state or class of the performance measure is of interest, Markov models and classification machine learning algorithms can be utilized. However, if decision-makers are interested in numeric value of performance indicators, they need to use regression learning algorithms. A limitation of Markov models is that they cannot consider the history of maintenance, which are among important attribute for predicting the future conditions. Deterioration models developed based on machine learning do not have this limitation. Furthermore, they can include other features such as climatic attributes and traffic as input variables.

==== Markov models ====
A large portion of probabilistic deterioration models are developed based on Markov chain, which is a probabilistic discrete event simulation model. Deterioration models developed based on Markov chain consider the condition of asset as a series of discrete states. For instance, in the case of pavement deterioration modeling, the PCI can be categorized into five classes: good, satisfactory, fair, poor and very poor (or simply 1 to 5). A Markov model is then developed to predict the probability of transition from state 1 to each of other states in a number of years. Crude Markov models have been criticized for disregarding the impact of ageing and maintenance history of the asset. More complex models known as semi-Markov models can account for history of maintenance, but their calibration requires a great deal of longitudinal data. Recently, efforts have been made to train Markov deterioration models to consider the impact of climate, but generally it is not possible to have climatic attributes or traffic as an input in these types of models.

==== Machine learning ====
Since the late 2000s machine learning algorithms have been adopted to tackle infrastructure deterioration modeling. Neural networks have been among the most commonly used models. Despite their high learning capability, neural networks have been criticized for their black-box nature, which does not provide enough room for interpretation of the model. Therefore, other algorithms have been used in the literature as well. Examples of other algorithms used for deterioration modeling are decision tree, k-NN, random forest, gradient boosting trees, random forest regression, and naive Bayes classifier. In this type model usually, the deterioration is predicted using a set of input variables or predictive features. The examples of predictive features used in the literature are initial condition, traffic, climatic features, pavement type and road class.
