= Pavement management =

Process of planning the maintenance and repair of roadway networks

Pavement management is the process of planning the maintenance and repair of a network of roadways or other paved facilities in order to optimize pavement conditions over the entire network.

It is also applied to airport runways and ocean freight terminals. In effect, every highway superintendent does pavement management.

Pavement management incorporates life cycle costs into a more systematic approach to minor and major road maintenance and reconstruction projects. The needs of the entire network as well as budget projections are considered before projects are executed, as the cost of data collection can change significantly. Pavement management encompasses the many aspects and tasks needed to maintain a quality pavement inventory, and ensure that the overall condition of the road network can be sustained at desired levels. While pavement management covers the entire lifecycle of pavement from planning to maintenance in any transport infrastructure, road asset management and road maintenance planning target more specifically road infrastructure.

In the United States, the introduction of the Governmental Accounting Standards Board’s (GASB’s) Statement 34 is having a dramatic impact on the financial reporting requirements of state and local governments. Introduced in June 1999, this provision recommends that governmental agencies report the value of their infrastructure assets in their financial statements. GASB recommends that government agencies use a historical cost approach for capitalizing long-lived capital assets; however, if historical information is not available, guidance is provided for an alternate approach based on the current replacement cost of the assets. A method of representing the costs associated with the use of the assets must also be selected, and two methods are allowed by GASB. One approach is to depreciate the assets over time. The modified approach, on the other hand, provides an agency more flexibility in reporting the value of its assets based upon the use of a systematic, defensible approach that accounts for the preservation of the asset. Pavement management and pavement management systems provide agencies with the tools necessary to evaluate their pavement assets and meet the GASB34 requirements under the modified depreciation approach.

== Pavement management systems ==
A pavement management system (PMS) is a planning tool used to aid pavement management decisions. PMS software programs model future pavement deterioration due to traffic and weather, and recommend maintenance and repairs to the road's pavement based on the type and age of the pavement and various measures of existing pavement quality. Measurements can be made by persons on the ground, visually from a moving vehicle, or using automated sensors mounted to a vehicle. PMS software often helps the user create composite pavement quality rankings based on pavement quality measures on roads or road sections. Recommendations are usually biased towards predictive maintenance, rather than allowing a road to deteriorate until it needs more extensive reconstruction.

Typical tasks performed by pavement management systems include:

1. Inventory pavement conditions, identifying good, fair and poor pavements.
2. Assign importance ratings for road segments, based on traffic volumes, road functional class, and community demand.
3. Schedule maintenance of good roads to keep them in good condition.
4. Schedule repairs of poor and fair pavements as remaining available funding allows.

Research has shown that it is far less expensive to keep a road in good condition than it is to repair it once it has deteriorated. This is why pavement management systems place the priority on preventive maintenance of roads in good condition, rather than reconstructing roads in poor condition. In terms of lifetime cost and long term pavement conditions, this will result in better system performance. Agencies that concentrate on restoring their bad roads often find that by the time they've repaired them all, the roads that were in good condition have deteriorated.

The State of California was among the first to adopt a (PMS) in 1979. Like others of its era, the first PMS was based in a mainframe computer and contained provisions for an extensive database. It can be used to determine long-term maintenance funding requirements and to examine the consequences on network condition if insufficient funding is available.

== Management approach ==
The pavement management process has been incorporated into several pavement management systems including SirWay. The following management approach evolved over the last 30 years as part of the development of the PAVER management system (U.S. Army COE, Construction Engineering Research Laboratory, Micro PAVER 2004).

The approach is a process that consists of the following steps:

1. Inventory Definition
2. Pavement Inspection
3. Condition Assessment
4. Condition Prediction
5. Condition Analysis
6. Work Planning

=== Inventory Definition ===
Typically, pavement management requires road inventory to be created and tied to an Asset Location Referencing System (ALRS). Road inventory includes road location using both coordinate and linear referencing systems, road width, road length and pavement type.

=== Condition Assessment ===
Pavement condition can be divided into structural and functional condition with various condition variables. Functional condition can be divided into roughness, texture and skid resistance while structural condition includes mechanical properties and pavement distresses. To measure such indices, costly laser-based tools are used extensively while development of cost effective tools such as RGB-D sensors significantly reduces the cost of data collection.

=== Condition Prediction ===
Pavement condition prediction is often referred to pavement deterioration modeling, which can be based on mechanical or empirical models. Also, hybrid parameterized models are popular. More recently other methods based on Markov models and machine learning have been proposed that outperform their former counterparts. Pavement deterioration is caused by traffic and weather conditions. Also, material and construction choices affect the deterioration process. It has been shown that empirical models outperform the mechanical and hybrid models in condition prediction.

=== Work Planning ===
Work planning is essentially road maintenance planning in which the maintenance works are assigned both spatially and temporally according to the desired criteria such as minimal costs to the society.
