= Level of service =

Level of service may refer to:

- Levels of service in asset management
- Level of service (transportation) in transportation and traffic
- Something agreed on in a Service-level agreement (SLA)
