= MATX =

MATX or variants could refer to:

- MicroATX, a motherboard form factor
- Macrotexture, a kind of road texture
