= LTPP Data Analysis Contest =

The LTPP has been holding the LTPP data analysis contest in collaboration with the ASCE since 1998.

The LTPP International Data Analysis Contest or the LTPP Data Analysis Contest is an annual international data analysis contest held by the American Society of Civil Engineers and Federal Highway Administration. The participants use LTPP data within their analysis. The winners of this data analysis contest are announced in early January during the Transportation Research Board annual meeting.

== History ==
The LTPP database contains the data of more than 2,500 road sections across the US and Canada. The FHWA and ASCE launched a joint effort to encourage researchers around the world to use the LTPP data. The contest was first introduced in 1998 by the Transportation and Development Institute (T&DI) of the American Society of Civil Engineers and the LTPP of FHWA. The goal of the contest is to encourage consultants, academics and data scientists around the world to use the LTPP database for generating knowledge about the behaviour of pavements and roads.

== Categories ==
The LTPP data analysis contest has four different categories:

- Undergraduate Student Category
- Graduate Category
- Partnership Category
- Challenge Category (Aramis Lopez Challenge)

The first two categories are limited to students. The participants of all categories are required to summarize their work within an article.

== Winners ==
Years	Winner(s) of challenge category	Affiliation
2019-20	Fengdi Guo	Massachusetts Institute of Technology
2018-19	-	-
2017-18	Hongren Gong, Baoshan Huang and Yiren Sun	
2016–17	S. Madeh Piryonesi and Tamer El-Diraby	University of Toronto
2015–16	Michael Elwardany, Kangjin Lee, Jung Hwa Lee, and Coleman Brown	
2014–15	Xueqin Chen	
2013–14	Changwei Xu	University of Cambridge

== See also ==
- List of engineering awards
- List of mathematics awards
