= Pavement cracking =

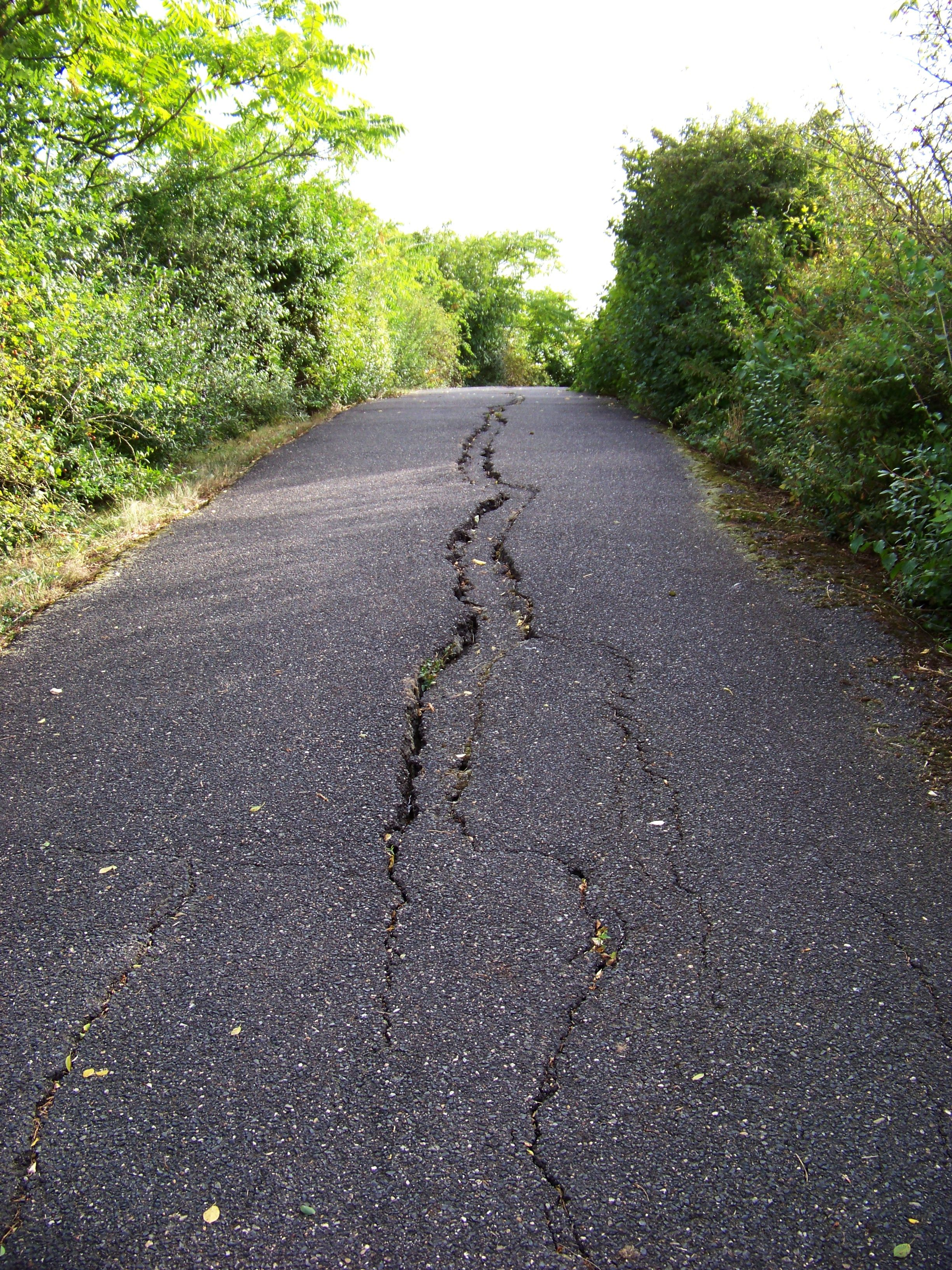
Cracking along the road axis possibly due to poor construction and formation of a cold joint

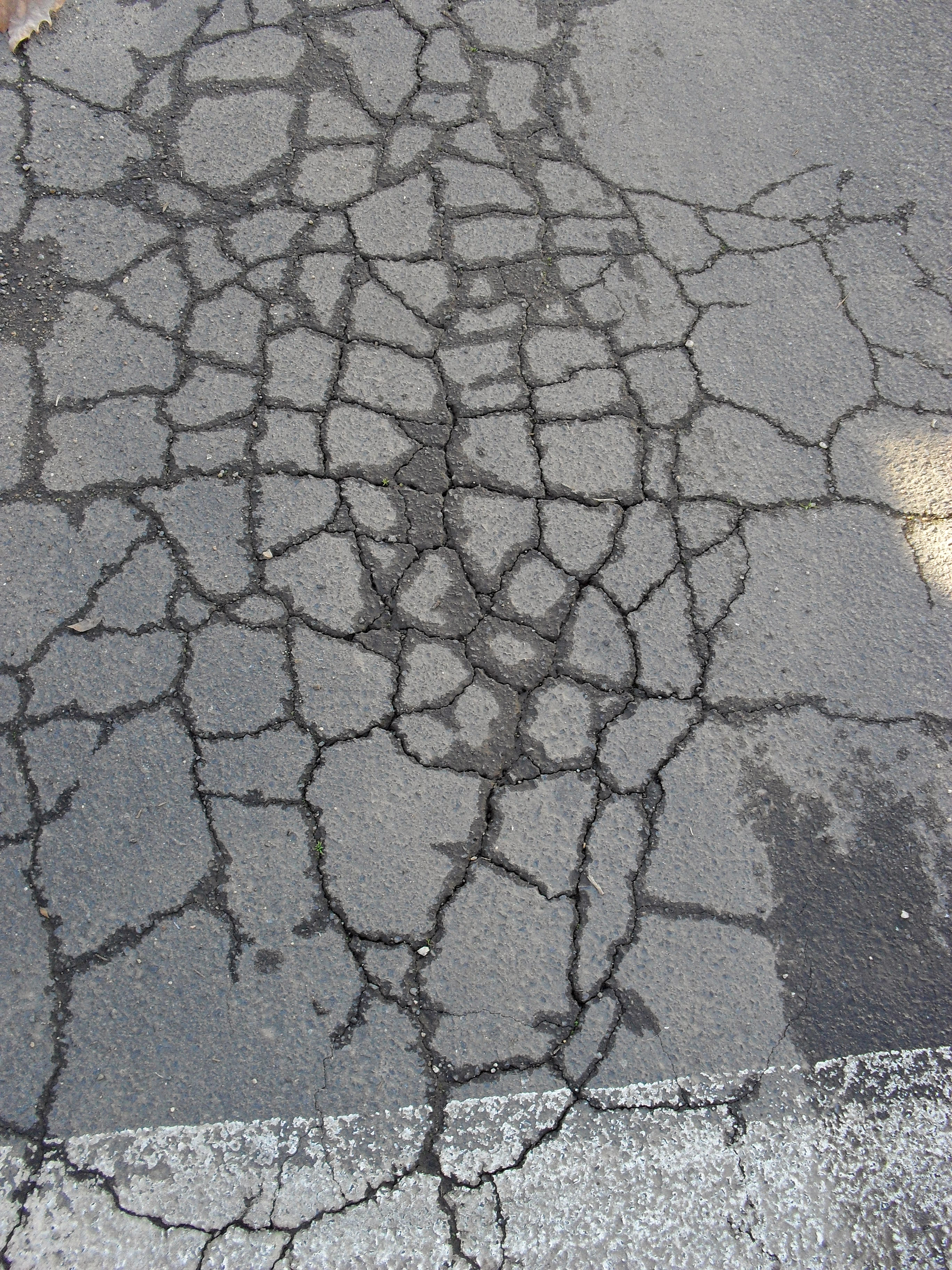
Alligator cracking

Pavement crack refers to a variety of types of pavement distresses that occur on the surface of pavements. Different types of pavements develop different cracks. Type of cracking is also correlated with the type of climate and traffic. Sometimes the cracks are aggregated using an index such as Crack index, and sometimes they are merged with other distresses and are reported using Pavement Condition Index.

== Types of cracking ==
Some of the most important types of crack are as follows:

- Crocodile cracking, also known as alligator cracking and fatigue cracking
- Block cracking (caused by shrinkage of asphalt)
- Longitudinal cracking—wheel path
- Longitudinal cracking—non-wheel path
- Transverse cracking
- Reflection cracking at joints
- Edge cracking (caused because of poor drainage or lack of support at the edge)
- Slippage cracking
