= Rolling straight-edge =

Measuring device for road straightness

Generic principle of the apparatus: 1 – Road surface 2 – Road wheels 3 – Straight-edge 4 – Measuring wheel 5 – Deviation indicator gauge 6 – Direction of travel

The rolling straight-edge (also rolling straightedge or planograph) is an instrument used to measure the surface regularity of roads and similar structures such as airport runways. It consists of a straightedge of a fixed distance mounted on wheels with a sensor at the centrepoint measuring deviation in height. It is rolled along the road surface and set to specific trigger levels which can be logged automatically or by means of an audible alarm. The rolling straight-edge was developed by the British Road Research Laboratory to replace earlier manual methods of measurement using rulers. It has been used by several countries and remains in use in the United Kingdom, Germany and Taiwan.

== Description ==
The rolling straight-edge is a piece of equipment used to measure the surface regularity of roads and similar structures, such as airport runways. The equipment consists of a long beam (the straight edge) mounted on wheels with a measuring wheel at the midpoint. The measuring wheel moves up and down according to depressions in the road surface, a sensor measures the vertical movement, which is recorded on a graduated scale. The equipment is rolled longitudinally down the surface being measured. The equipment can be fitted with a bell or buzzer that alerts the user when a set limit of vertical deviation is breached. The recording of data, typically chainage and magnitude or number of deviations, can be done by hand, though some units contain automated dataloggers. A smoothness index for the road can be derived from a standard deviation analysis of the results.

As an example of a unit the Road Research Laboratory rolling straight-edge measures 3 metres (9.8 ft) in length with the sensor mounted at the midpoint. The unit was mounted on forty 127-millimetre (5.0 in) diameter road wheels mounted in pairs 152 millimetres (6.0 in) apart. The whole unit is dismantlable into three parts for transport and the frame was made of glass fibre. it was designed to be pulled along the road by hand at a slow walking pace, approximately 1–2 kilometres per hour (0.6–1 mph).

== History ==
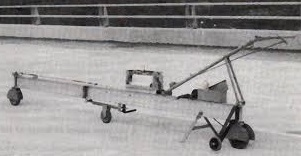
California rolling straight-edge

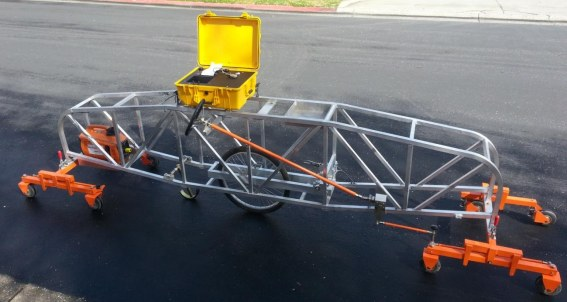
Rolling straight-edge

The rolling straight-edge is one of the earliest methods of measuring surface regularity. It was a development of an earlier technique of measuring road depressions manually with a ruler under a 10 feet (3.0 m) straight-edge. This method had later been developed by the British Department of Transport with the use of graduated wedges which were pushed under the ruler to measure the height, but remained a slow and cumbersome technique. The government's Road Research Laboratory developed the rolling straight-edge as a quicker method. The original design only had wheels at either end of the straight edge but this proved liable to error from small bumps so additional wheels were added.

The current British practice as set out in its national standards, the Specification for Highway Works, is for the rolling straight-edge to be used for checking surface regularity of all sections of road longer than 75 metres (246 ft) in length. The manual graduated wedge method is retained for use on shorter sections of road or where the rolling straight-edge proves impractical to use. The specification sets out the number of deviations greater than 4 millimetres (0.16 in) and greater than 7 millimetres (0.28 in) that are permitted per 300 metres (980 ft) section of carriageway. The specification allows for two levels of tolerance, for category A roads and category B roads, with the client specifying which is to be used. Twice as many deviations are permitted on category B roads. No deviation greater than 10 millimetres (0.39 in) is permitted.

In the United States 10 feet (3.0 m) rolling straight-edges have previously featured in some state highways specifications. Devices as long as 12 feet (3.7 m) and 6 metres (20 ft) have also been used. The National Academies of Sciences, Engineering, and Medicine's journal Transportation Research Record in 1996 described the instruments as "cumbersome devices with limited production capability" and noted that they could miss deviations with a wavelength of half the length of the straight-edge, due to the fixed points of reference at either end. By 2001 36 US state departments of transport were specifying the use of profilographs to derive a profile index as a measure of surface regularity, rather than rolling straight-edges. The profilograph takes a series of laser measurements of the road surface along a defined track.

The Taiwan Area National Expressway Engineering Bureau specification requires a rolling straight-edge as a means of measuring surface regularity. It specifies a maximum of 3 millimetres (0.12 in) of deviation over any 3 metres (9.8 ft) length, but contractors have criticised this as being unachievable. In Germany the equipment, in use since 1960, is known as a planograph and a straight-edge with 4 metres (13 ft) length is used.
