= Levels of service =

Quality control assessment for numerous types of assets

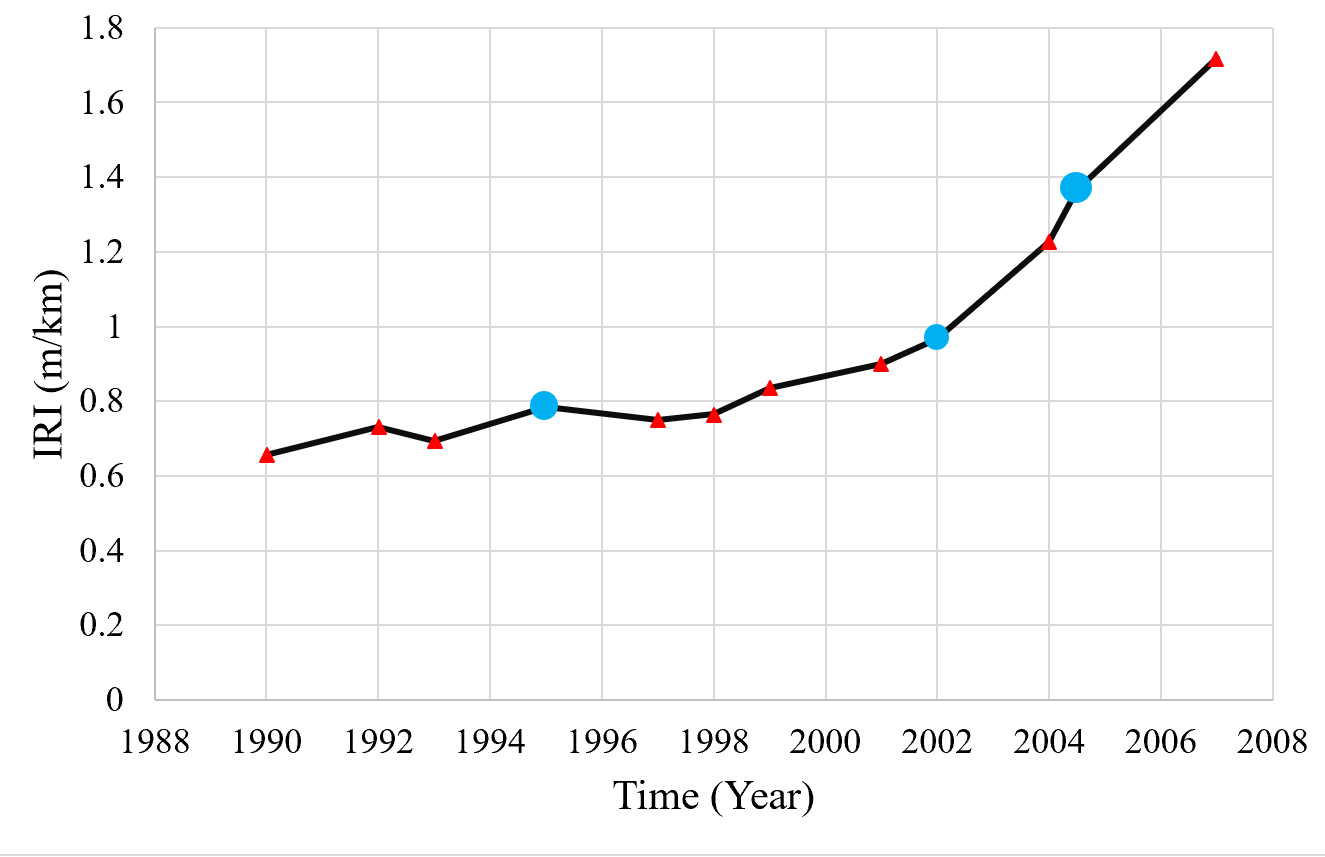
Many organizations use physical performance indicators to represent levels of service. The graph shows the change in International roughness index, a physical performance indicator often used to represent the LOS of road assets.

Levels of service (LOS) is a term in asset management referring to the quality of a given service. Defining and measuring levels of service is a key activity in developing infrastructure asset management plans. Levels of service may be tied to physical performance of assets or be defined via customer expectation and satisfaction. The latter is more service-centric rather than asset-centric. For instance, when measuring the LOS of a road, it could be measured by a physical performance indicator such as Pavement Condition Index (PCI) or by a measure related to customer satisfaction such as the number of complaints per month about that certain road section. Or in the case of traffic level of service, it could be measured by the geometry of road or by travel time of the vehicles, which reflects the quality of traffic flow. So, levels of service can have multiple facets: customer satisfaction, environmental requirements and legal requirements.

== Technical and strategic levels of service ==
Levels of service also can be seen as technical or strategic. Technical LOS reflects the service provider's perspective, while strategic LOS represents the customer or user's perspective. For instance in the case of sewer infrastructure, a municipality (as the service provider) may measure the number of micro-cracks in a pipe or sewer and model its expected lifetime to ensure the quality of the service, but the user's main concern is the availability and reliability of the sewer system, not necessarily the technical aspects of the physical infrastructure. In simple words, as long as the user can flush his/her toilet, he/she may not have any issue with the deterioration of the pipe.

== Desired and current levels of service ==
Current LOS are the service levels that are currently being provided by the service provider. Desired or expected levels of service are the levels that the provider (and the customer) want to reach or find satisfactory. For example assuming that in a municipality the average Pavement Condition Index of roads is 75 and the average travel time from point A to B is 55 minutes. The municipality learns this information after measuring the LOS for roads and wants improve this LOS to catch up with desired levels of service. Assuming that their desired LOS for roads is an average PCI of 80 and an average travel time of 50 minutes from point A to B, they have to work towards this objective by improving current levels of service.

== Levels of service analysis ==
Analysis of LOS includes the following steps:

- Understanding customer expectation
- Developing LOS
- Consultation, communication and approval
- Continuous review, updates and enhancement
