= Bathtub curve =

Curve for failure rates over time

The 'bathtub curve' hazard function (blue, upper solid line) is a combination of a decreasing hazard of early failure (red dotted line) and an increasing hazard of wear-out failure (yellow dotted line), plus some constant hazard of random failure (green, lower solid line).

In reliability engineering and deterioration modeling, a bathtub curve is a failure rate graph that curves up at both ends, similar in shape to a bathtub. The term can also apply to any graph with this shape.

Many but not all electronic consumer product life cycles follow the bathtub curve. It is difficult to know where a product is along the bathtub curve, or even if the bathtub curve is applicable to a certain product without large numbers of products in use and associated failure rate data.

In reliability engineering, the cumulative distribution function corresponding to a bathtub curve may be analysed using a Weibull chart or in a reliability contour map.

== Description ==
The bathtub curve has 3 regions:

1. The first region has a decreasing failure rate due to early failures (a.k.a. the "infant mortality phase").
2. The middle region is a constant failure rate due to random failures (a.k.a. the "useful life phase").
3. The last region is an increasing failure rate due to wear-out failures (a.k.a. the "wear-out phase").

A product is said to follow the bathtub curve if in the early life of a product, the failure rate decreases as defective products are identified and discarded, and early sources of potential failure such as manufacturing defects or damage during transit are detected. In the mid-life of a product the failure rate is constant. In the later life of the product, the failure rate increases due to wearout.

If products are retired early or have decreased usage near their end of life, the product may show fewer failures per unit calendar time (but not per unit use time) than the bathtub curve predicts.

Some manufacturers burn in or test their products in an attempt to reduce early failures.

== See also ==
- Gompertz–Makeham law of mortality
