= Split friction =

Split friction (or μ (mu) - split) is a road condition that occurs when the friction significantly differs between the left and the right wheelpath.

The road may then not be perceived as hazardous when accelerating, cruising or even braking softly. But in a case of hard (emergency-)braking, the car will start to rotate over the wheelpath offering highest grip. Split friction may cause jackknifing of articulated trucks, while trucks with towed trailers may experience trailer swing phenomena. Split friction may be caused by an improper road spot repair that results in high variance of texture and color (thin ice on newly paved black spots thaws faster than ice on old greyish asphalt) across the road section.

To some extent, the risk for split friction can be measured with a road profilograph, scanning the pavement texture in both the left and right wheel paths.

A full analysis of the split friction issue requires a friction device that measures both the left and right wheel track at the same time.
