= Bleeding (roads) =

Asphalt defect

Bleeding or flushing is shiny, black surface film of asphalt on the road surface caused by upward movement of asphalt in the pavement surface. Common causes of bleeding are too much asphalt in asphalt concrete, hot weather, low space air void content and quality of asphalt. Bleeding is a safety concern since it results in a very smooth surface, without the texture required to prevent hydroplaning. Road performance measures such as IRI cannot capture the existence of bleeding as it does not increase the surface roughness. But other performance measures such as PCI do include bleeding.

== See also ==
- Pavement Condition Index
- International Roughness Index
- Asphalt concrete
- Road slipperiness
