= Pavement condition index =

Methodology for assessing quality of bitumen road

The pavement condition index (PCI) is a numerical index between 0 and 100, which is used to indicate the general condition of a pavement section. The PCI is widely used in transportation civil engineering and asset management, and many municipalities use it to measure the performance of their road infrastructure and their levels of service. It is a statistical measure and requires manual survey of the pavement. This index was originally developed by the United States Army Corps of Engineers as an airfield pavement rating system, but later modified for roadway pavements and standardized by the ASTM. The surveying processes and calculation methods have been documented and standardized by ASTM for both roads and airport pavements:

- ASTM D6433 - 20: Standard Practice for Roads and Parking Lots Pavement Condition Index Surveys
- ASTM D5340 - 20: Standard Test Method for Airport Pavement Condition Index Surveys

== Calculation ==
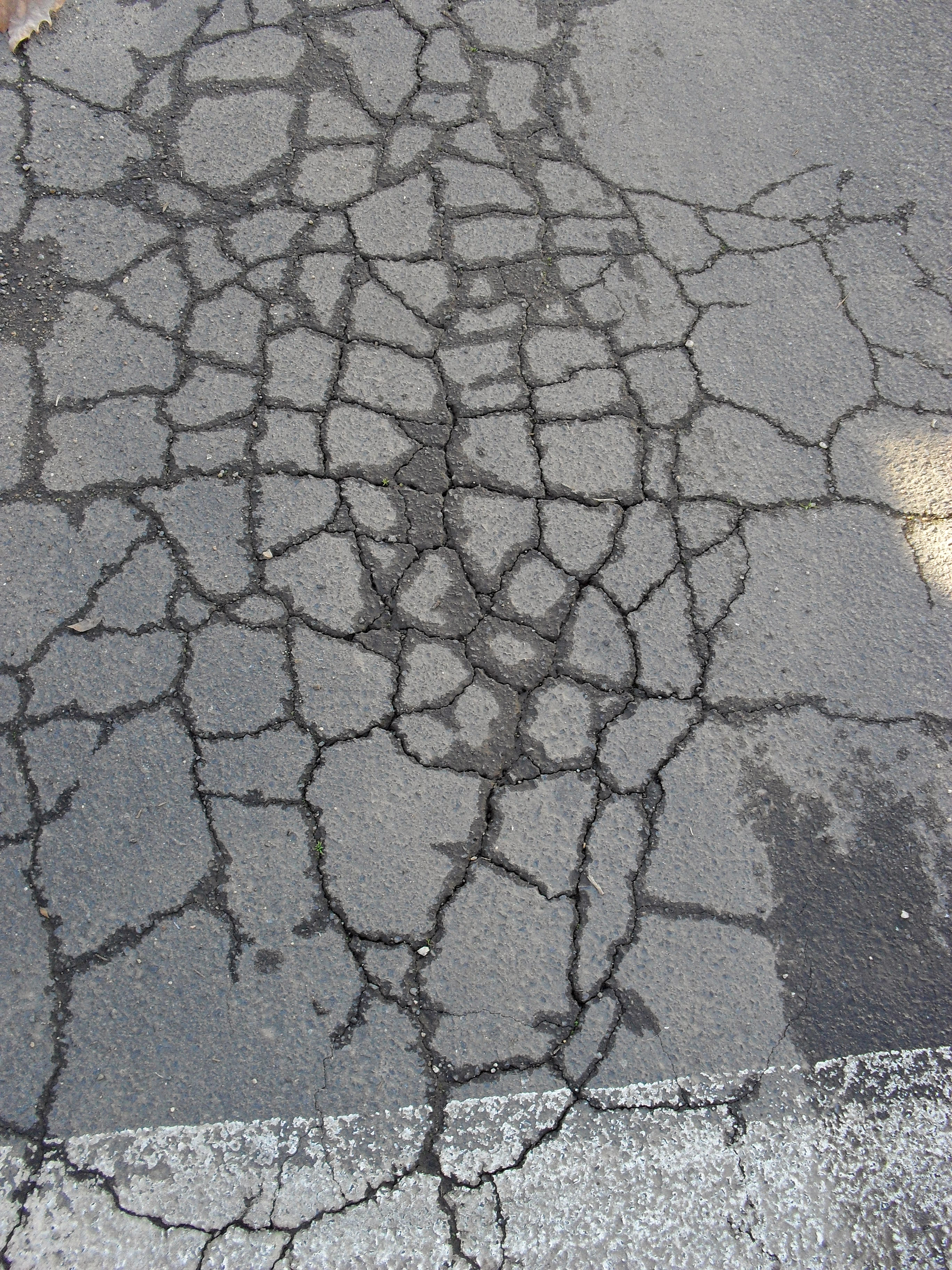
Alligator cracking is one of the distress types used to calculate the PCI.

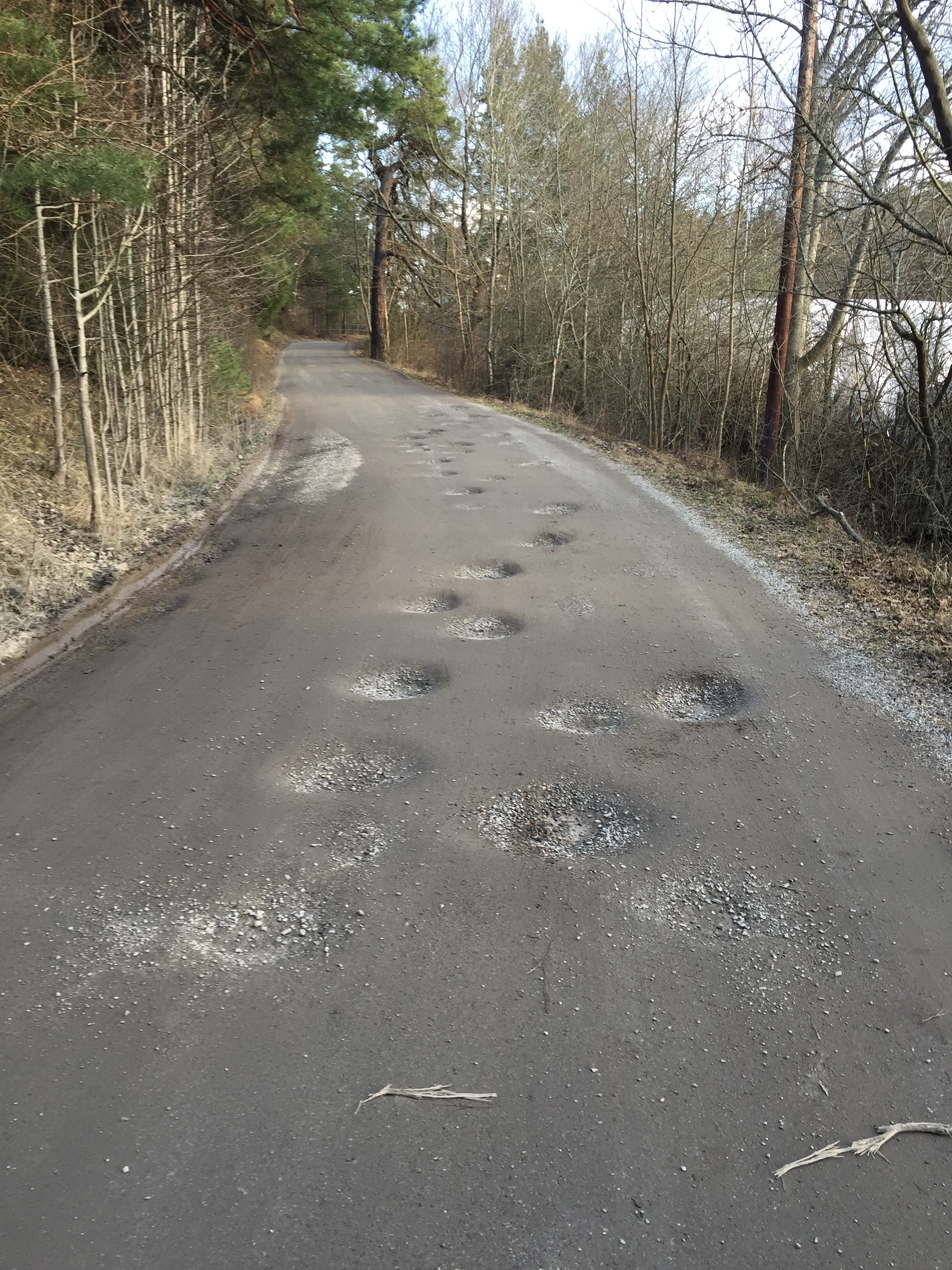
Number of potholes is an important input for calculating the PCI of a road.

The method is based on a visual survey of the number and types of distresses in a pavement. First, the type and extent of existing distresses, their severity level is collected. Next, distress density is calculated for each type of distress. The density values are translated into deduct value (DV) and corrected deduct value (CDV) using a set of curves proposed by the ASTM. The ASTM does not include the formulae of these curves, but they are recalculated by researchers. Finally, the value of the PCI is calculated in an iterative process. The result of the analysis is a numerical value between 0 and 100, with 100 representing the best possible condition and 0 representing the worst possible condition.

Pavement distress types for asphalt pavements include:

- Alligator cracking
- Bleeding
- Block cracking
- Bumps and sags
- Corrugations
- Depressions
- Edge cracking
- Joint reflections
- Lane/shoulder drop-off
- Longitudinal and transverse cracking
- Low ride quality
- Patching and utility cut patching
- Polished aggregate
- Potholes
- Rutting
- Shoving
- Slippage cracking
- Swelling
- Weathering and raveling

For relatively small pavement systems, the entire system may be surveyed. For large pavement systems, the process may involve surveying a random or representative sample of the entire system with the following steps:

- Divide the total pavement section into sample units (approximately 5000 square feet).
- Based on the number of sample units in the total section, a certain number of these units are selected to be tested. For example, if there are 40 or more sample units, 10% are tested.
- The type, extent and severity of pavement distress in each section are recorded using the ASTM Standard D 5340 method.
- The PCI of each tested sample unit is calculated using the method defined in the standard. In summary this involves calculating the distress quantities and the distress densities for each tested unit. These values are used to determine a deduct value and this deduct value is subtracted from 100 to give the PCI value.
- If the surveyed samples are representative of the overall system, the PCI of the pavement system is then assumed to be equal to the PCI of the sampled areas.

This condition index can give a good indication of the pavement condition of a network. However, trained personnel are required to complete the complicated survey procedure.

== Categorization ==
The ASTM divides the PCI into seven classes as follows, but in practice a PCI lower than 40 is almost impassable.

PCI range	Class
86-100	Good
71-85	Satisfactory
56-70	Fair
41-55	Poor
26-40	Very Poor
11-25	Serious
0-10	Failed

== Relationship with roughness ==
PCI is correlated with the performance indicators measuring roughness such as international roughness index (IRI). Generally, a road with a high PCI has a low IRI, and a road with a high IRI has a low PCI. However, this is not always the case. For example, two roads with the same PCI can have significantly different IRI values as a result of having different types of distresses or grades.

== See also ==
- Pavement classification number
- International Roughness Index
- AASHO Road Test – AASHO experiment for studying highway pavements deterioration
