= AASHO Road Test =

AASHO experiment for studying highway pavements deterioration

Coordinates: 41.3679338°N 88.9085183°W

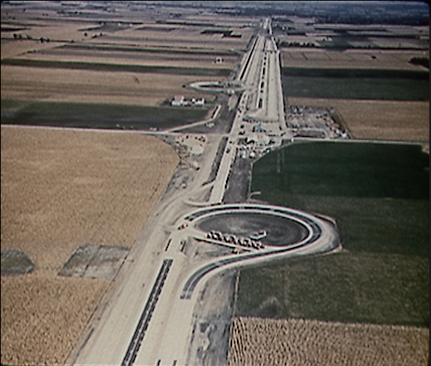
Aerial view of the test site

The AASHO Road Test was a series of experiments carried out by the American Association of State Highway and Transportation Officials (AASHTO), (Note: The American Association of State Highway Officials (AASHO) was renamed the American Association of State Highway and Transportation Officials (AASHTO) on November 13, 1973.) to determine how traffic contributed to the deterioration of highway pavements.

== Methodology ==
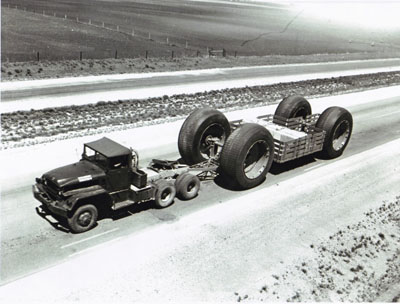
Illinois Off-Road Train Trailer used in the test conducted after completion of regular test traffic

The AASHO road test was to study the performance of pavement structures of known thickness under moving loads of known magnitude and frequency. The study was carried out from August 1956 to November 30, 1960 in Ottawa, Illinois and has been used as a primary source of experimental data when vehicle wear to highways is considered, for the purposes of road design, vehicle taxation, and cost.

The road test consisted of six two-lane loops along the future alignment of Interstate 80. Each lane was subjected to repeated loading by a specific vehicle type and weight. The pavement structure within each loop was varied so that the interaction of vehicle loads and pavement structure could be investigated. Satellite studies were planned in other parts of the country so that climate and subgrade effects could be investigated, but were never carried out.

== Legacy ==
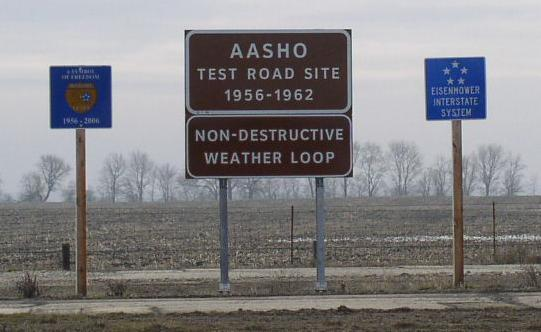
Contemporary historic place marker roadsign at the site.

The results from the AASHO road test were used to develop a pavement design guide, first issued in 1961 as the AASHO Interim Guide for the Design of Rigid and Flexible Pavements, with major updates issued in 1972 and 1993. More recent versions of the guide are not primarily based on the results of the AASHO Road Test.

The AASHO road test introduced many concepts in pavement engineering, including the load equivalency factor. Unsurprisingly, the heavier vehicles reduced the serviceability in a much shorter time than light vehicles, and the oft-quoted figure, called the generalized fourth power law, that damage caused by vehicles is "related to the 4th power of their axle weight", is derived from this. The other direct result of the tests were new quality assurance standards for road construction in the US, which are still in use today.

The road test used large road user panels to establish the present serviceability rating (PSR) for each test section. Since panel ratings are expensive, a substitute key parameter present serviceability index (PSI) was established. The PSI is based on data on the road's longitudinal roughness, patchwork, rutting, and cracking. Later studies have shown that PSI is mainly a fruit of unevenness, with a correlation of more than 90% between the two. Unevenness was measured with a mechanical profilograph, reporting a parameter called slope variance (SV). SV is the second spatial derivative of height. For a vehicle traveling at speed, SV is the exciting source to vertical acceleration; the second derivative in time domain of height. This makes very good sense, since 1 – 80 Hz acceleration is the parameter used when relating human exposure from vibration to perceived discomfort in the ISO 2631-1 (1997) standard. Thus, SV is physically linked to ride quality.

While the study is outdated, it is still used as a reference, though critics point out that its data is only valid under the specific conditions of the test with regard to the time, place, environment, and material properties present during the test. Extrapolating the data to different situations has been "problematic". Other studies have attempted to refine the results, either through further empirical studies or by developing mathematical models, with varying success.
