= Long-Term Pavement Performance =

Research project on road pavements

The logo of the LTPP

Long-Term Pavement Performance Program, known as LTPP, is a research project supported by the Federal Highway Administration (FHWA) to collect and analyze pavement data in the United States and Canada. Currently, the LTPP acquires the largest road performance database.

== History ==
The LTPP was initiated by the Transportation Research Board (TRB) of the National Research Council (NRC) in the early 1980s. The FHWA with the cooperation of the American Association of State Highway and Transportation Officials (AASHTO) sponsored the program. The program was focusing on examining the deterioration of the nation’s highway and bridge infrastructure system. In the early 1980s, TRB and NRC suggested that a "Strategic Highway Research Program (SHRP)" should be started to concentrate on research and development activities that would majorly contribute to highway transportation improvement. Later in 1986, the detailed programs were published entitled "Strategic Highway Research Program—Research Plans".

The LTPP program collects data from in-service roads and analyzes it as planned by the SHRP. The LTPP aims to understand the possible reasons behind the poor or good performance of pavements. Hence, the effects of different parameters such as weather, maintenance actions, material and traffic on performance are studied. Data is collected in a timely manner, and then analyzed to understand and predict the performance of roads. The LTPP program was transferred from SHRP to the FHWA in 1992 to continue the work.

== Database ==
LTPP Data is collected by four regional contractors. New data is regularly uploaded to the online platform every six months. The number of the pavement test sections monitored in the LTPP program is more than 2,500. These pavement sections include both asphalt and Portland cement concrete. Road sections are across different states of the United States and provinces of Canada.

== Data analysis contest ==
The LTPP holds an annual international data analysis contest in collaboration with the ASCE. The participants are supposed to use the LTPP data.
