= Rut (roads) =

Groove in a road caused by vehicle traffic

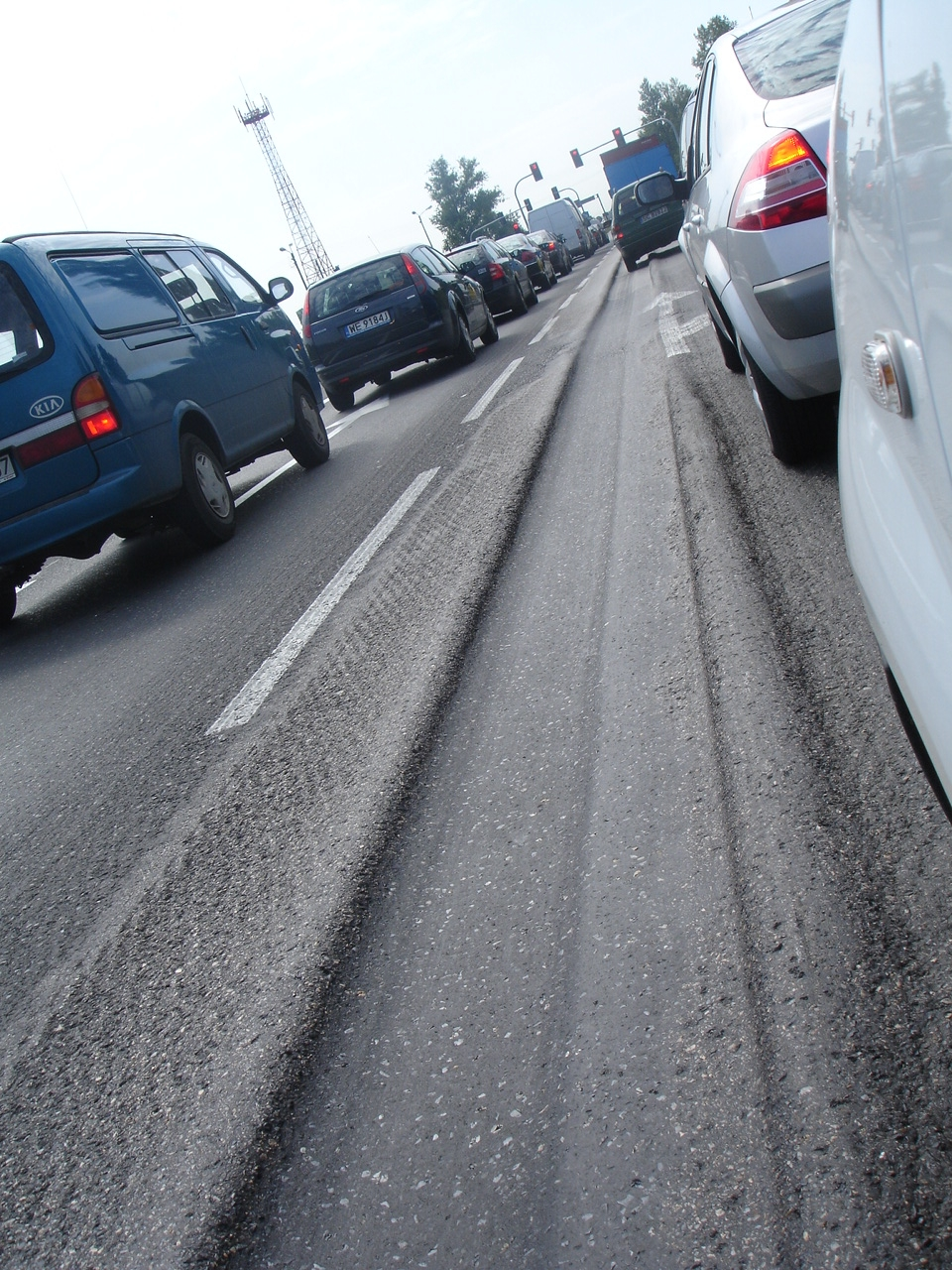
14 cm rut on a main road between Częstochowa and Katowice in Poczesna, Silesian Voivodeship, Poland

A rut is a depression or groove worn into a road or path by the travel of wheels or skis. Ruts can be formed by wear, as from studded snow tires common in cold climate areas, or they can form through the deformation of the asphalt concrete, pavement or subbase material. In modern roads the main cause is heavily loaded trucks. These heavy loaded trucks imprint their tire impressions on roads over time, causing ruts. Rut is a common pavement distress and is often used in pavement performance modeling.

Ruts prevent rainwater from flowing to the side of the road into ditches or gutters. Rainwater trapped in ruts is a common contributing factor to hydroplaning crashes. Severe ruts can impede steering if a vehicle has difficulty steering out of the rut. If it proves impossible to steer out of a rut, though forward and backward progress can be made by the vehicle, it is referred to as being stuck in the rut.

Ruts in gravel roads can be removed by grading the road surface. Ruts in asphalt pavement can be filled with asphalt, then overlaid with another layer of asphalt, but better results can usually be achieved by grinding off the surface to restore the proper cross slope, then resurfacing. If the ruts are formed due to deformation of the subbase below the pavement, the only long-term repair is usually full-depth reconstruction of the road.

Typically rutting is reported in terms of rut depth. Rutting is measured at highway speeds with a laser/inertial profilograph.

The term stuck in a rut can be used figuratively to refer to a situation in which, as time progresses, the situation is unable to be changed or steered in a desired way.

== Rutways ==
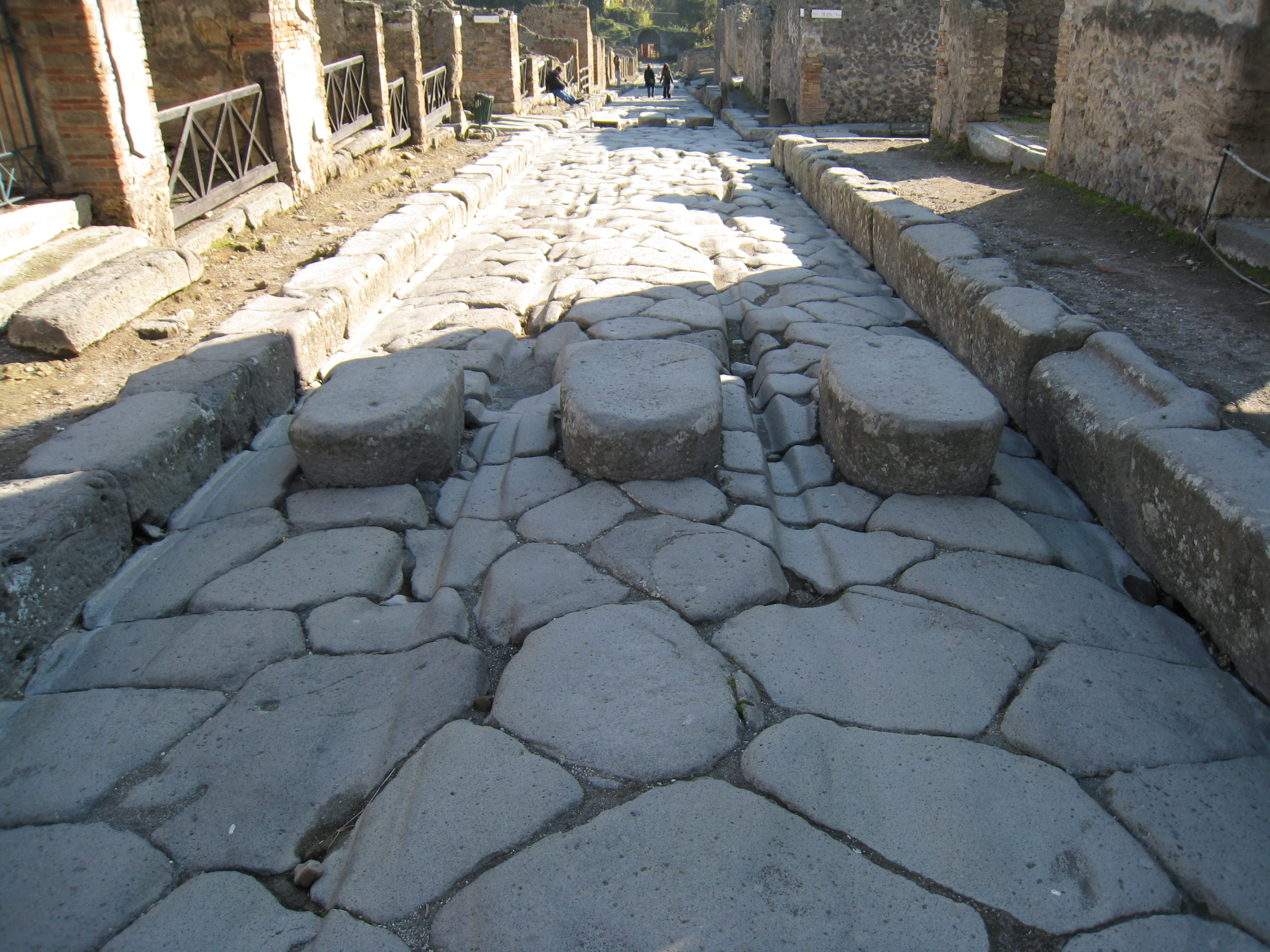
Wheel ruts on an ancient Roman road in Pompeii, designed to guide carriages

Rutting can also be intentional. The ancient Assyrians, Babylonians, Persians and Greeks constructed roads with artificial wheel-ruts deliberately cut into rock. The ruts were spaced apart from each other the same distance as the wheelspan of an ordinary carriage, and thus constituted grooves that guided the carriages on the rutway. Such ancient stone rutways connected major cities with sacred sites, such as Athens to Eleusis, Sparta to Ayklia, or Elis to Olympia. The gauge of these stone grooves was 138 to 144 cm (4 ft 6 in to 4 ft 9 in). The largest number of preserved stone trackways, over 150, are found on Malta.

Some of these ancient stone rutways were very ambitious. Around 600 BC the citizens of ancient Corinth constructed the Diolkos, which some consider the world's first railway. The Diolkos was a hard poros limestone road with grooved tracks (wheel-ruts), along which large wooden flatbed cars carrying entire ships and their cargo were pulled by slaves or draft animals. The grooves were at 1.67 m (5 ft 6 in) centres.

== Gauge ==
References going back to at least 1937 suggest that the "gauge" of ancient rutways, and the distance between the wheels of carts influenced the railway standard gauge of the modern era which is 1,435 mm (4 ft 8 1/2 in). The argument is that this is shown by the evidence of rutted roads marked by cart wheels dating from the Roman Empire. (Note: The gaps in the pedestrian crossings in Pompeii could give credence or otherwise to this statement, but no relevant studies appear to have been made.) Snopes categorized this legend as false but commented that "... it is perhaps more fairly labelled as 'True, but for trivial and unremarkable reasons.'" The historical tendency to place the wheels of horse-drawn vehicles approximately 5 feet (1,500 mm) apart probably derives from the width needed to fit a carthorse in between the shafts. In addition, while road-traveling vehicles are typically measured from the outermost portions of the wheel rims (and there is some evidence that the first railroads were measured in this way as well), it became apparent that for vehicles travelling on rails it was better to have the wheel flanges located inside the rails, and thus the distance measured on the inside of the wheels (and, by extension, the inside faces of the rail heads), was the important one.

== Studded tires ==
On relatively level highways, the depth of the ruts due to carbide studded tires is relatively uniform; however, on hilly highways the ruts tend to be deeper on the uphill sections compared to the downhill and level sections. On the uphill sections, the vehicle delivers more power to the wheels to overcome gravity, thereby, increasing the shearing force of the studs against the pavement, thus resulting in an increased cutting action. Ruts are also deeper at the entry to and exit from intersections and corners, due to deceleration (braking) and acceleration.

== See also ==
- Bleeding (roads)
- Crocodile cracking
- History of rail transport
