= Road texture =

Road surface term

Road surface textures are deviations from a planar and smooth surface, affecting the vehicle/tyre interaction. Pavement texture is divided into: microtexture with wavelengths from 0 mm to 0.5 millimetres (0.020 in), macrotexture with wavelengths from 0.5 millimetres (0.020 in) to 50 millimetres (2.0 in) and megatexture with wavelengths from 50 millimetres (2.0 in) to 500 millimetres (20 in).

== Microtexture ==
Microtexture (MiTx) is the collaborative term for a material's crystallographic parameters and other aspects of microstructure: such as morphology, including size and shape distributions; chemical composition; and crystal orientation and relationships.

== Macrotexture ==
Macrotexture (MaTx) is partly a desired property and partly an undesired property. Short MaTx waves, about 5 mm, act as acoustical pores and reduce tyre/road noise. On the other hand, long wave MaTx increase noise. MaTx provide wet road friction, especially at high speeds. Excessive MaTx increases rolling resistance and thus fuel consumption and CO_{2} emission, contributing to global warming. Proper roads have MaTx of about 1 mm Mean Profile Depth.

Macrotexture is a family of wave-shaped road surface characteristics. While vehicle suspension deflection and dynamic tyre loads are affected by longer waves (roughness), road texture affects the interaction between the road surface and the tyre footprint. Macrotexture has wavelengths from 0.5 mm up to 50 mm.

Road agencies monitor macrotexture using measurements taken with highway speed laser or inertial profilometers.

== Megatexture ==
Megatexture (MeTx) is a result of pavement wear and distress, causing noise and vibration. Megatexture has wavelengths from 50 mm up to 500 mm. Some examples of road damages with much MeTx are potholes, washboards (common on dirt roads) and uneven frost heaves. MeTx below 0.2 mm Root-Mean-Square is considered normal on proper roads.

== Measurement ==
MaTx and MeTx are measured with laser/inertial profilographs. Since MiTx has so short waves, it is preferably measured by dry friction brake tests rather than by profiling. Profilographs that record texture in both left and right wheel paths can be used to identify road sections with hazardous split friction.

=== Profilograph ===
The profilograph is a device used to measure pavement surface roughness. In the early 20th century, profilographs were low speed rolling devices (for example rolling straight-edges). Today, many profilographs are advanced high speed systems with a laser based height sensor in combination with an inertial system that creates a large scale reference plane. It is used by construction crews or certified consultants to measure the roughness of in-service road networks, as well as before and after milling off ridges and paving overlays. Modern profilographs are fully computerized instruments.

The data collected by a profilograph is used to calculate the International Roughness Index (IRI), which is expressed in units of inches/mile or mm/m. IRI values range from 0 (equivalent to driving on a plate of glass) upwards to several hundred in/mile (a very rough road). The IRI value is used for road management to monitor road safety and quality issues.

Many road profilographs are also measuring the pavements cross slope, curvature, longitudinal gradient and rutting. Some profilographs take digital photos or videos while profiling the road. Most profilographs also record the position, using GPS technology. Yet another common measurement option is cracks. Some profilograph systems include a ground penetrating radar, used to record asphalt layer thickness.

Another type of profilograph system is for measuring the surface texture of a road and how it relates to the coefficient of friction and thus to skid resistance. Pavement texture is divided into three categories; megatexture, macrotexture, and microtexture. Microtexture cannot currently be measured directly, except in a laboratory. Megatexture is measured using a similar profiling method as when obtaining IRI values, while macrotexture is the measurement of the individual variations of the road within a small interval of a few centimeters. For example, a road which has gravel spread on top followed by an asphalt seal coat will have a high macrotexture, and a road built with concrete slabs will have low macrotexture. For this reason, concrete is often grooved or roughed up immediately after it is laid on the road bed to increase the friction between the tire and road.

Equipment to measure macrotexture currently consists of a distance measuring laser with an extremely small spot size (< 1 mm) and data acquisition systems capable of recording elevations spaced at 1 mm or less. The sample rate is generally over 32 kHz. Macrotexture data can be used to calculate the speed-dependent part of friction between typical car tires and the road surface in both dry and wet conditions. Microtexture affects friction as well.

Lateral friction and cross slope are the key reaction forces acting to keep a cornering vehicle in steady lateral position, while it is subject to exiting forces arising from speed and curvature. Cross slope and curvature can be measured with a road profilograph, and in combination with friction-related measurements can be used to identify improperly banked curves, which can increase the risk of motor vehicle accidents.

=== Road profilometery ===
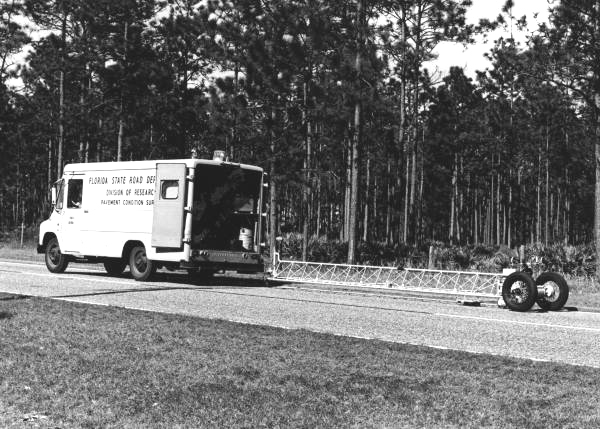
A van pulling a road profilometer (undated, before 1969).

Road pavement profilometers (aka profilographs, as used in the famous 1958-1960 AASHO Road Test) use a distance measuring laser (suspended approximately 30 cm from the pavement) in combination with an odometer and an inertial unit (normally an accelerometer to detect vehicle movement in the vertical plane) that establishes a moving reference plane to which the laser distances are integrated. The inertial compensation makes the profile data more or less independent of what speed the profilometer vehicle had during the measurements, with the assumption that the vehicle does not make large speed variations and the speed is kept above 25 km/h or 15 mph. The profilometer system collects data at normal highway speeds, sampling the surface elevations at intervals of 2–15 cm (1–6 in), and requires a high speed data acquisition system capable of obtaining measurements in the kilohertz range.

The data collected by a profilometer is used to calculate the International Roughness Index (IRI) which is expressed in units of inches/mile or mm/m. IRI values range from 0 (equivalent to driving on a plate of glass) upwards to several hundred in/mi (a very rough road). The IRI value is used for road management to monitor road safety and quality issues.

Many road profilers also measure the pavement's cross slope, curvature, longitudinal gradient and rutting. Some profilers take digital photos or videos while profiling the road. Most profilers also record the position, using GPS technology. Another quite common measurement option is cracks. Some profilometer systems include a ground penetrating radar, used to record asphalt layer thickness.

Another type of profilometer is for measuring the surface texture of a road and how it relates to the coefficient of friction and thus to skid resistance. Pavement texture is divided into three categories: megatexture, macrotexture, and microtexture. Microtexture cannot currently be measured directly, except in a laboratory. Megatexture is measured using a similar profiling method as when obtaining IRI values, while macrotexture is the measurement of the individual variations of the road within a small interval of a few centimeters. For example, a road which has gravel spread on top followed by an asphalt seal coat will have a high macrotexture, and a road built with concrete slabs will have low macrotexture. For this reason, concrete is often grooved or roughed up immediately after it is laid on the road bed to increase the friction between the tire and road.

Equipment to measure macrotexture currently consists of a distance measuring laser with an extremely small spot size (< 1 mm) and data acquisition systems capable of recording elevations spaced at a mm or less apart. The sample rate is generally over 32 kHz. Macrotexture data can be used to calculate the speed-depending part of the friction number between typical car tires and the road surface. The macrotexture also give information on the difference between dry and wet road friction. However, macrotexture cannot be used to calculate a relevant friction number, since also microtexture affects the friction.

Lateral friction and cross slope are the key reaction forces acting to keep a cornering vehicle in steady lateral position, while exposed to exciting forces from speed and curvature. Since friction is strongly dependent on macrotexture and texture, cross slope as well as curvature can be measured with a road profiler, so road profilers are very useful to identify improperly banked curves that may pose a risk to motor vehicles.

== See also ==
- Road
- Roughness
- Rut (roads)
- Superelevation
- Profilometer
- Ride quality
