= International roughness index =

Roughness index

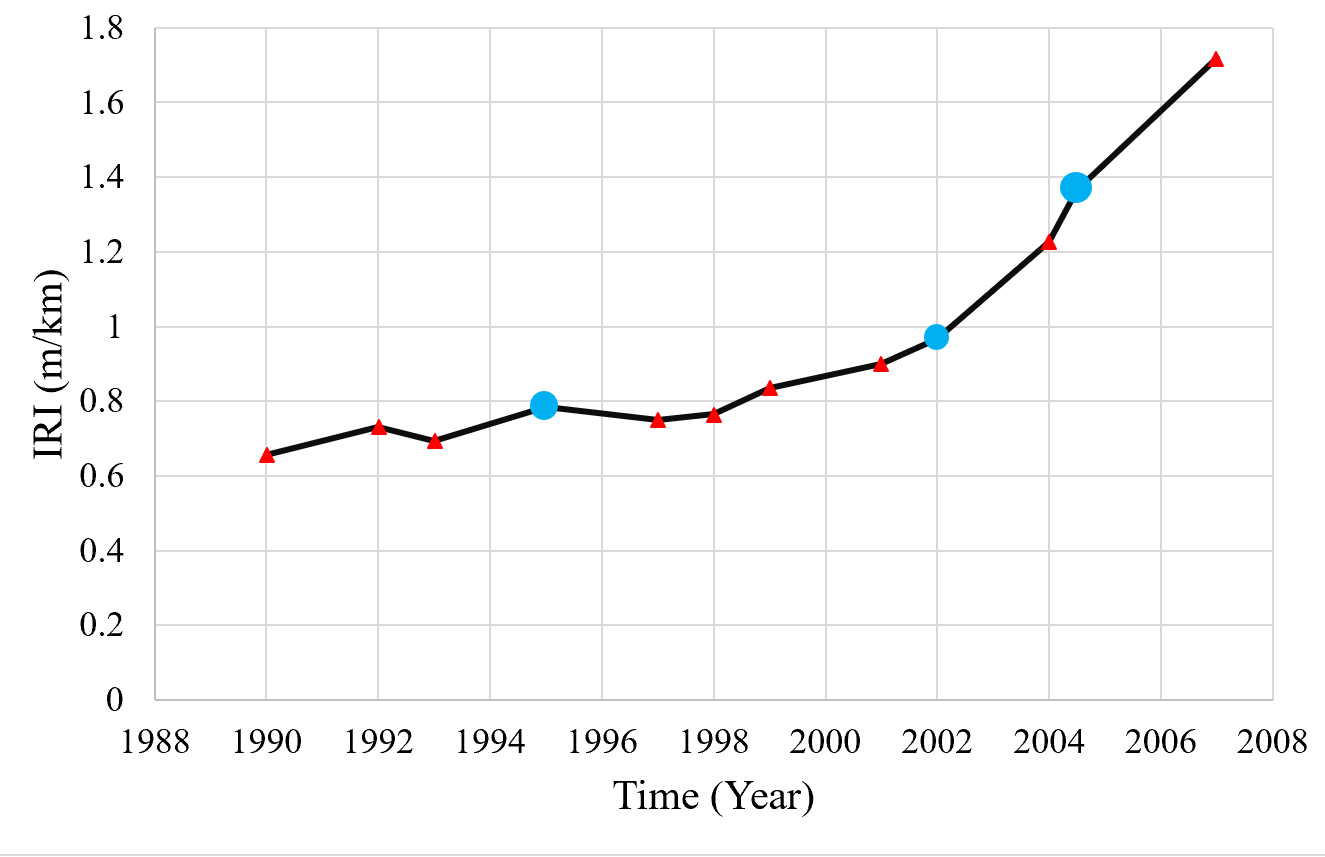
Roughness progression for a road in Texas, US. Blue dots show the times of maintenance.

The international roughness index (IRI) is the roughness index most commonly obtained from measured longitudinal road profiles. It is calculated using a quarter-car vehicle math model, whose response is accumulated to yield a roughness index with units of slope (in/mi, m/km, etc.). Although a universal term, IRI is calculated per wheelpath, but can be expanded to a Mean Roughness Index (MRI) when both wheelpath profiles are collected. This performance measure has less stochasticity and subjectivity in comparison to other pavement performance indicators, such as PCI, but it is not completely devoid of randomness. The sources of variability in IRI data include the difference among the readings of different runs of the test vehicle and the difference between the readings of the right and left wheel paths. Despite these facts, since its introduction in 1986, the IRI has become the road roughness index most commonly used worldwide for evaluating and managing road systems.

The measurement of IRI is required for data provided to the United States Federal Highway Administration, and is covered in several standards from ASTM International: ASTM E1926 - 08, ASTM E1364 - 95(2005), and others. IRI is also used to evaluate new pavement construction, to determine penalties or bonus payments based on smoothness.

== History ==
In the early 1980s the highway engineering community identified road roughness as the primary indicator of the utility of a highway network to road users. However, existing methods used to characterize roughness were not reproducible by different agencies using different measuring equipment and methods. Even within a given agency, the methods were not necessarily repeatable. Nor were they stable with time.

The United States National Cooperative Highway Research Program initiated a research project to help state agencies improve their use of roughness measuring equipment. The work was continued by The World Bank to determine how to compare or convert data obtained from different countries (mostly developing countries) involved in World Bank projects. Findings from the World Bank testing showed that most equipment in use could produce useful roughness measures on a single scale if methods were standardized. The roughness scale that was defined and tested was eventually named the International Roughness Index. The IRI is used in managing pavement assets, as well as sometimes in evaluating new construction to determine bonus/penalty payments for contractors or for identifying specific locations where repairs or improvements (e.g., grinding or resurfacing) are recommended. The IRI is also a key determinant of vehicle operating costs which are used to determine the economic viability of road improvement projects.

== Definition ==
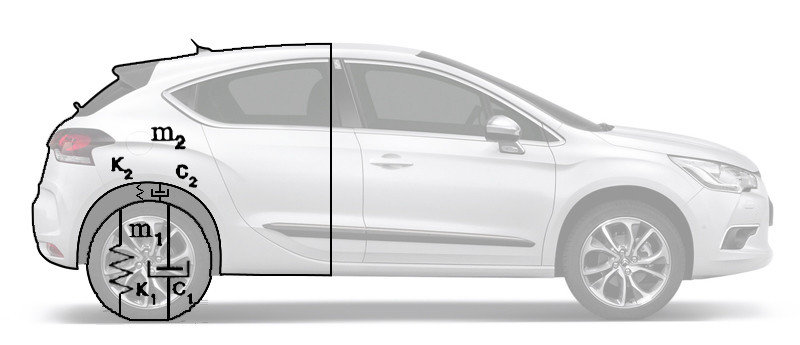
Golden car for IRI measurement as a spring

The IRI was defined as a mathematical property of a two-dimensional road profile (a longitudinal slice of the road showing elevation as it varies with longitudinal distance along a travelled track on the road). As such, it can be calculated from profiles obtained with any valid measurement method, ranging from static rod and level surveying equipment to high-speed inertial profiling systems.

The quarter-car math model replicates roughness measurements that were in use by highway agencies in the 1970s and 1980s. The IRI is statistically equivalent to the methods that were in use, in the sense that correlation of IRI with a typical instrumented vehicle (called a "response type road roughness measuring system", RTRRMS) was as good as the correlation between the measures from any two RTRRMS's. As a profile-based statistic, the IRI had the advantage of being repeatable, reproducible, and stable with time. The IRI is based on the concept of a 'golden car' whose suspension properties are known. The IRI is calculated by simulating the response of this 'golden car' to the road profile. In the simulation, the simulated vehicle speed is 80 km/h (49.7 mi/h). The properties of the 'golden car' were selected in earlier research to provide high correlation with the ride response of a wide range of automobiles that might be instrumented to measure a slope statistic (m/km). The damping in the IRI is higher than most vehicles, to prevent the math model from "tuning in" to specific wavelengths and producing a sensitivity not shared by the vehicle population at large.

The slope statistic of the IRI was chosen for backward compatibility with roughness measures in use. It is the average absolute (rectified) relative velocity of the suspension, divided by vehicle speed to convert from rate (e.g. m/s) to slope (m/km). The frequency content of the suspension movement rate is similar to the frequency content of chassis vertical acceleration and also tire/road vertical loading. Thus, IRI is highly correlated to the overall ride vibration level and to the overall pavement loading vibration level. Although it is not optimized to match any particular vehicle with full fidelity, it is so strongly correlated with ride quality and road loading that most research projects that have tested alternate statistics have not found significant improvements in correlation.

The frequency of the suspension response at the golden-car simulation speed also determines the final IRI ride value. The IRI sensitivity is focused on wavelengths between 0.82 and nearly 200-feet (0.25 to 61 meters). Although, if any wavelengths are equal to 7.9 or 50 feet (2.4 or 15.2 meters) the IRI values are weighted higher. The quarter car model has higher correlations to light trucks and heavy trucks.

IRI values are reported as inches per mile (in/mi), meters per kilometer (m/km), or millimeters per kilometer (mm/km) based upon the movement of the suspension over the distance driven. Highway agencies use IRI thresholds to characterize road condition; for example, in the United States, an IRI of less than 95 in/mi (1.50 m/km) is generally considered by the Federal Highway Administration to be in "good" condition, an IRI from 96 to 170 in/mi (1.51 to 2.68 m/km) is considered "acceptable", and an IRI exceeding 170 in/mile (2.68 m/km) is considered "poor".

== Measurement ==
The IRI is calculated from the road profile. This profile can be measured in several different ways. The most common measurements are with Class 1 instruments, capable of directly measuring the road profile, and Class 3 instruments, which use correlation equations. Using World Bank terminology, these correspond to Information Quality Level (IQL) 1 and IQL-3 devices, representing the relative accuracy of the measurements. A common misconception is that the 80 km/h used in the simulation must also be used when physically measuring roughness with an instrumented vehicle. IQL-1 systems measure the elevation profile, independent of speed, and IQL-3 systems typically have correlation equations for different speeds to relate the actual measurements to IRI. If the captured profiles are the same, the IRI values will be the same.

IQL-1 systems can report varying intervals of roughness. IRI is reported at 10–20-meter or 528-foot (160-meter) intervals for project level collections. IQL-3 at 100m+ intervals.

Early measurements were done with a rod-and-level survey technique. The Transportation Research Laboratory developed a beam which had a vertical displacement transducer. From the late 1990s the use of the Dipstick Profiler, with a reported accuracy of .01 mm ( 0.0004 inches), became quite common. The ROMDAS Z-250 operates in a similar manner to the Dipstick. The ARRB Systems walking profiler, ICC SurPRO, and SSI CS8800 Walking Profiler were major innovations to collect accurate profiles at walking speed. The ARRB, ICC, and SSI walking profiler units regularly collect data for FHWA Reference Profiler Rodeos (Data Collections 2009-2013& Report DTFH61-10-D-00026). These units can be used to certify inertial profilers as a reference device since they have a sampling interval less than 2.75-inches per AASHTO PP49.

Dynamic measurements of the road profile are done with vehicle mounted instruments. The approach consisted of a sensor (initially ultrasonic but later laser) which measures the height of the vehicle relative to the road. An accelerometer is double integrated to give the height of the sensor relative to datum. The difference between the two is the relative elevation profile of the road. This elevation profile is then processed through the quarter-car algorithm to obtain the IRI. The most common approaches see the IRI measured in each wheelpath. The two wheelpath IRIs need to be combined to obtain the overall IRI "roughness profile". for the lane. There are two ways this can be done. A 'half-car' (HRI) model simulates the vehicle travelling along both wheelpaths, while a 'quarter car' model simulates one wheel on each wheelpath and the average is the lane IRI. The quarter-car approach is considered more accurate in representing the motion felt by users and is most common.

A major issue with the profilers has to do with their contact areas compared to the footprint of a tyre. The latter is much larger than any of the static/slow speed Class 1 profilers or a typical laser profilometer. This can be addressed with a 4-inch or 6-inch line laser mounted in the wheelpaths to mimic the tire patch width. Or a high definition scanning laser can be used which create a 3D model of the pavement surface. Two examples of this are the Pavemetrics system and the XenoTrack-True Solid State Lidarwhich have been adopted by many different OEM suppliers of network-level profilometer equipment around the world. In addition to measuring roughness this system also measures other key pavement attributes such as cracking, rut depth and texture.

Less expensive alternatives to profilometers are RTRRMS which do not record the profile but rather are installed in vehicles and measure how the vehicle responds to the pavement profile. These need to be calibrated against IRI to obtain an estimate of the IRI. Since RTRRMS are generally affected by pavement texture and speed, it is common to have different calibration equations to correct the readings for these effects.

RTRRMS can be grouped into three broad categories and are generally IQL-3 except arguably most cell phone based systems which are IQL-4:

- Bump Integrators: These have a physical connection between the sprung and unsprung mass and record the relative motion. Originally trailer mounted, such as the one developed in India by CRRI, CRRI Trailer Bump Integrator, they are now most commonly installed on the floor of a vehicle with a cable connecting to the suspension such as those produced by the TRL (U.K.), CSIR (South Africa) or ROMDAS (N.Z.) ROMDAS Bump Integrator.
- Accelerometer Based Systems: These use an accelerometer to measure the relative motion of the sprung mass, corrected (sometimes) for the unsprung mass. Examples of these are the early ARAN systems (Canada) and the ARRB Roughometer (Australia).
- Cell Phone Based Systems: These are a subset of accelerometer systems insofar as the accelerometer is embedded in the cell phone. Examples of these apps are TotalPave, RoadBounce Roadroid, RoadLab Pro, RoadBump and . While these are becoming ubiquitous, the apps have major differences when it comes to setup and calibration features. They need to be used with great caution and are more appropriately considered IQL-4 than IQL-3

== Relationship with PCI ==
The IRI generally has a reverse relationship with the PCI. A smooth road with low IRI usually has a high PCI. However, this is not always the case, and a road with low IRI could have a low PCI too and vice versa. Therefore, one of these performance indicators is not necessarily enough to describe the road condition comprehensively. It is reported that the prediction of future IRI values may be easier than PCI as it includes less uncertainty.

== See also ==
- Road roughness
- Surface roughness
