= Grooved pavement =

Grooved pavement may refer to:

- Pavement milling
- Diamond grinding of pavement
