= Road surface =

Road covered with durable surface material

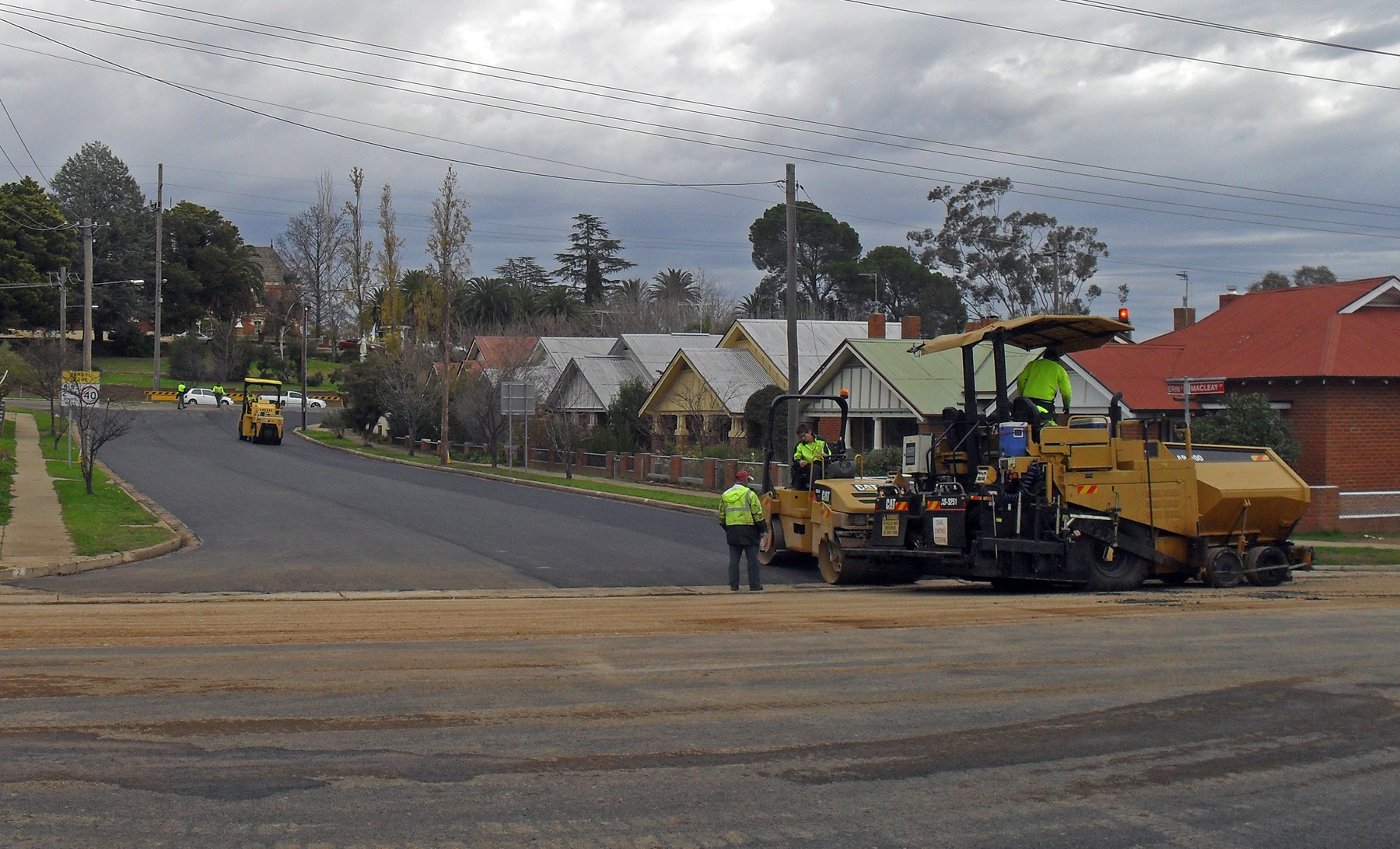
A road being resurfaced using a road roller

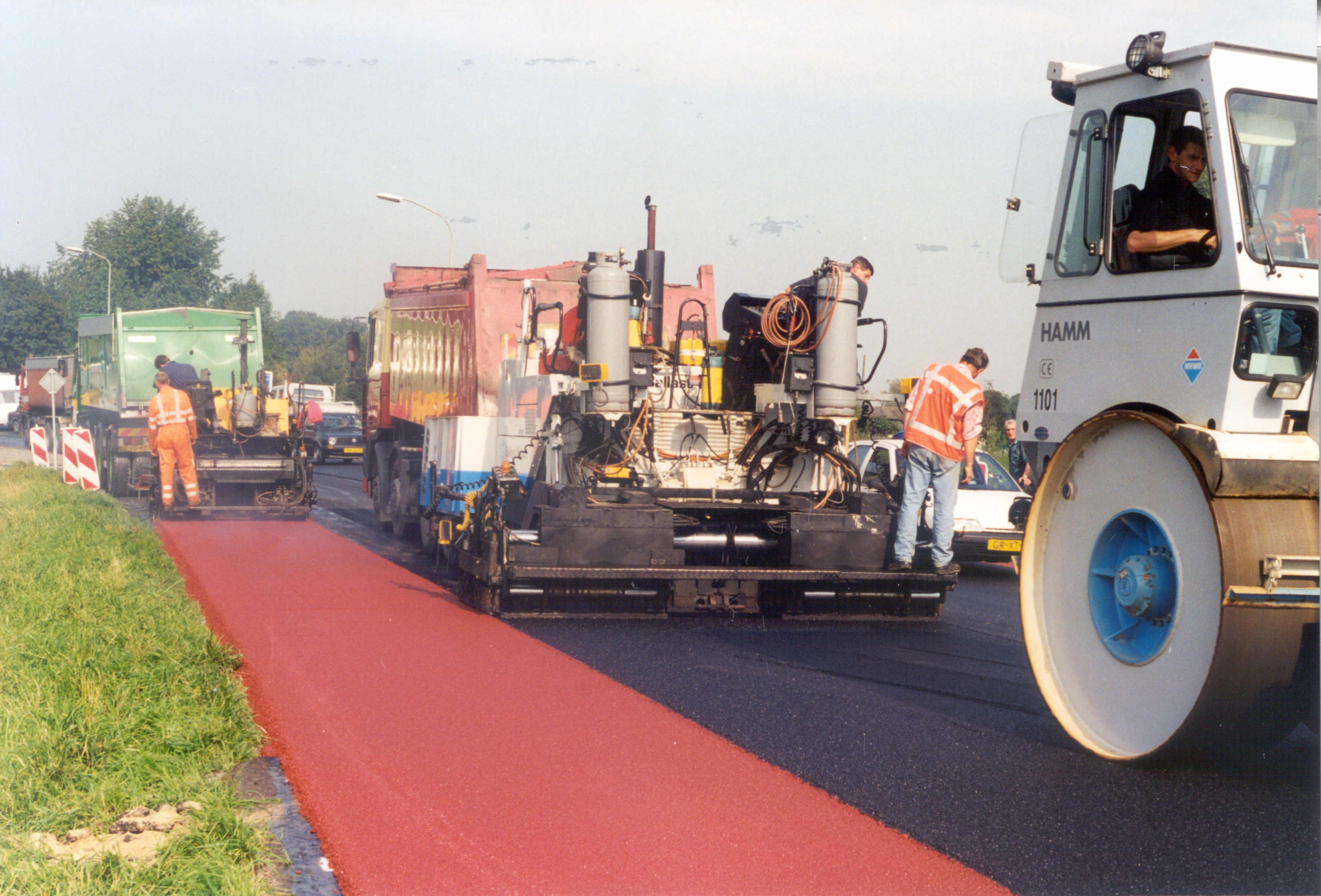
Red surfacing for a bicycle lane in the Netherlands

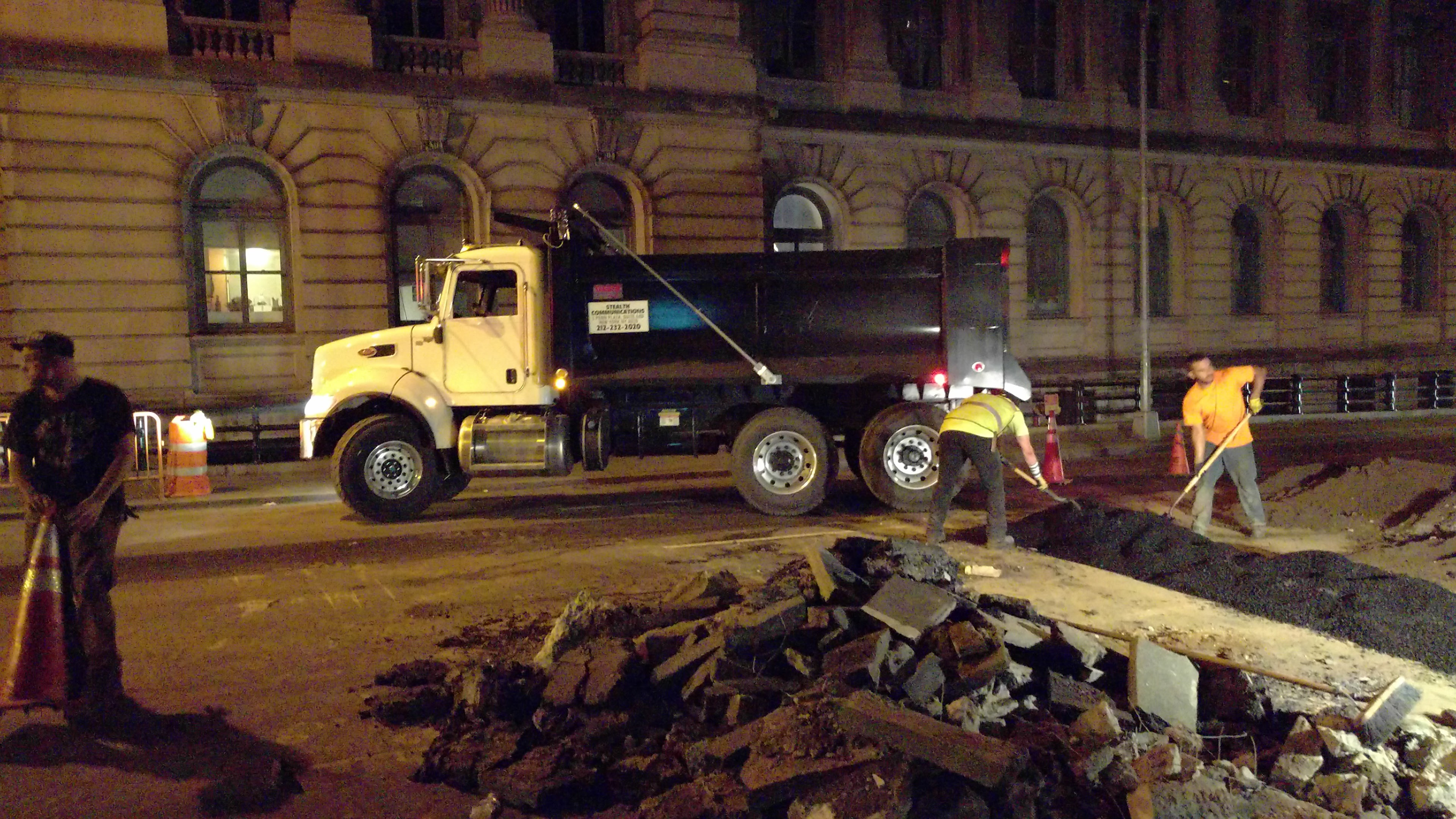
Construction crew laying down asphalt over fiber-optic trench, in New York City

A road surface (British English) or pavement (North American English) is the durable surface material laid down on an area intended to sustain vehicular or foot traffic, such as a road or walkway. In the past, gravel road surfaces, macadam, hoggin, cobblestone and sett granite were extensively used, but these have mostly been replaced by asphalt or concrete laid on a compacted base course. Asphalt mixtures have been used in pavement construction since the beginning of the 20th century and are of two types: metalled (hard-surfaced) and unmetalled roads. Metalled roadways are made to sustain vehicular load and so are usually made on frequently used roads. Unmetalled roads, also known as gravel roads or dirt roads, are rough and can sustain less weight. Road surfaces are frequently marked to guide traffic.

Today, permeable paving methods are beginning to be used for low-impact roadways and walkways to prevent flooding. Pavements are crucial to countries such as United States and Canada, which heavily depend on road transportation. Therefore, research projects such as Long-Term Pavement Performance have been launched to optimize the life cycle of different road surfaces.

Pavement, in construction, is an outdoor floor or superficial surface covering. Paving materials include asphalt, concrete, stones such as flagstone, cobblestone, and setts, artificial stone, bricks, tiles, and sometimes wood. In landscape architecture, pavements are part of the hardscape and are used on sidewalks, road surfaces, patios, and courtyards, among others.

The term pavement comes from Latin pavimentum, meaning a floor beaten or rammed down, through Old French pavement. The meaning of a beaten-down floor was obsolete before the word entered English.

Pavement, in the form of beaten gravel, dates back before the emergence of anatomically modern humans. Pavement laid in patterns like mosaics were commonly used by the Romans.

The bearing capacity and service life of a pavement can be raised significantly by arranging good drainage by an open ditch or covered drains to reduce moisture content in the pavements subbase and subgrade.

== Development ==
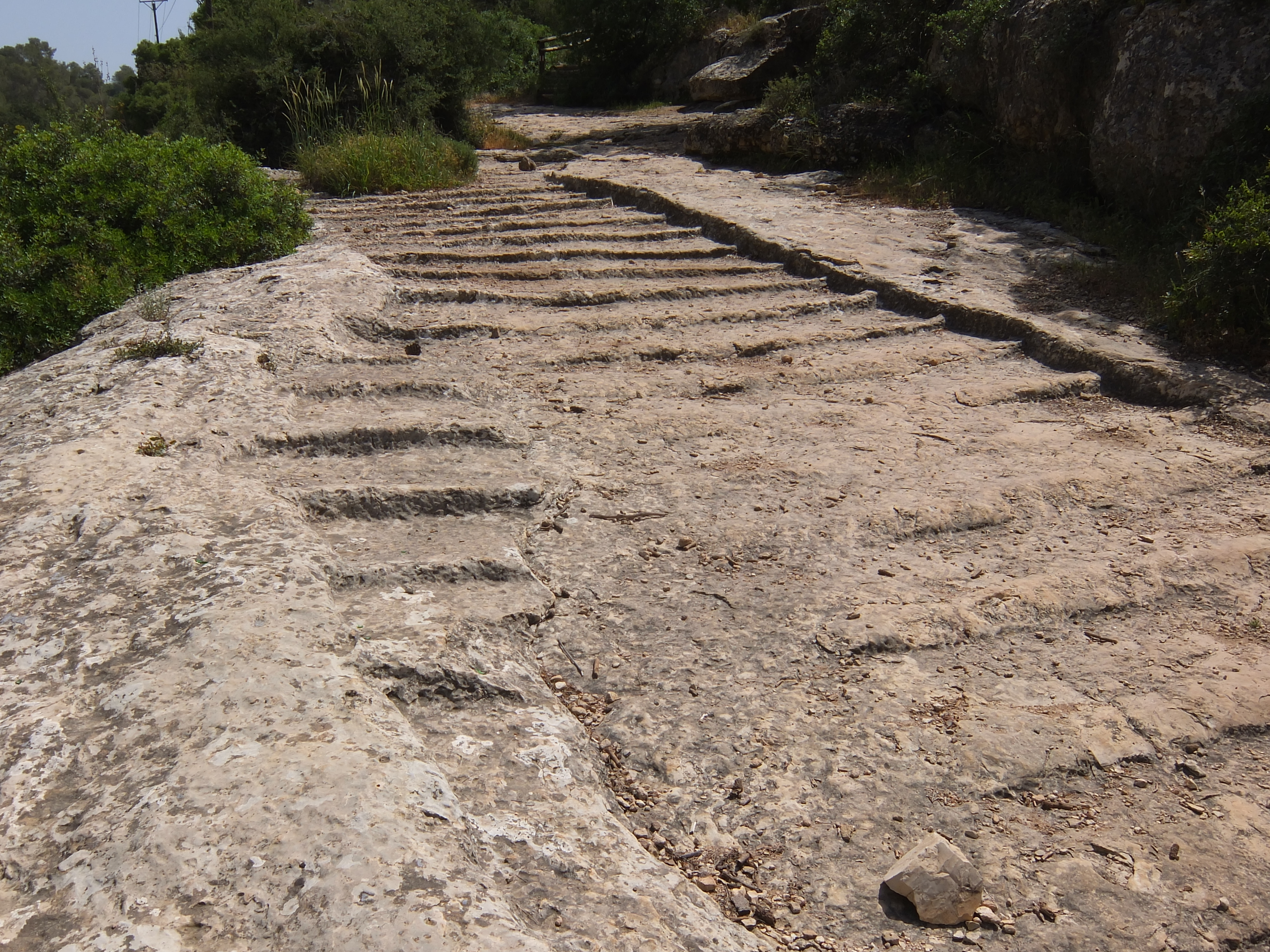
Old Roman road, leading from Jerusalem to Beit Gubrin, adjacent to regional highway 375 in Israel

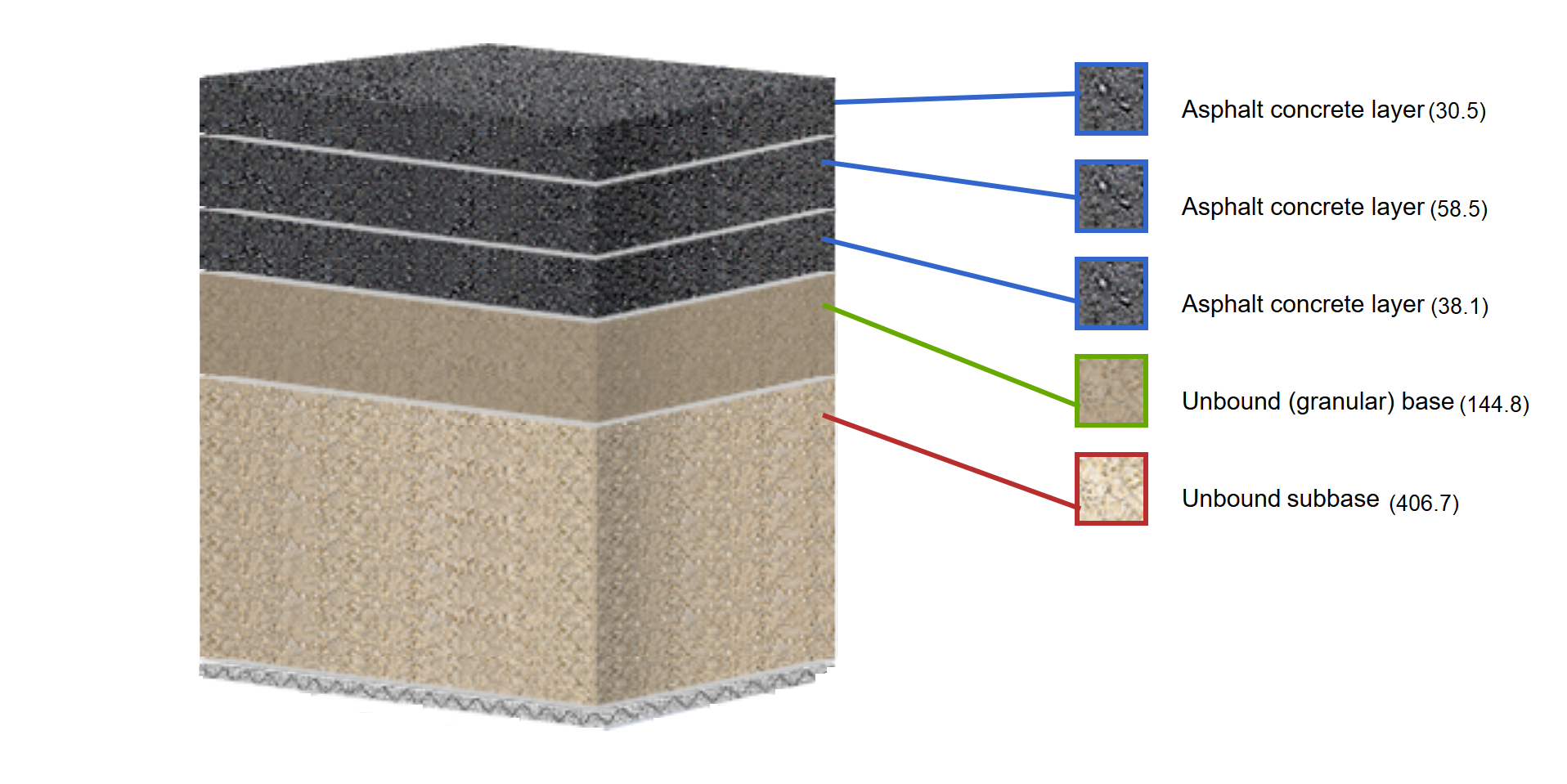
Different layers of road including asphalt layer. The total thickness of a pavement can be measured using granular base equivalency.

Wheeled transport created the need for better roads. Generally, natural materials cannot be both soft enough to form well-graded surfaces and strong enough to bear wheeled vehicles, especially when wet, and stay intact. In urban areas it was worthwhile to build stone-paved streets and, in fact, the first paved streets appear to have been built in Ur in 4000 BC. Corduroy roads were built in Glastonbury, England, in 3300 BC, and brick-paved roads were built in the Indus Valley Civilisation on the Indian subcontinent from around the same time. Improvements in metallurgy meant that by 2000 BC stone-cutting tools were generally available in the Middle East and Greece allowing local streets to be paved. Notably, in about 2000 BC, the Minoans built a 50 km paved road from Knossos in northern Crete through the mountains to Gortyn and Lebena, a port on the south coast of the island, which had side drains, a 200 mm thick pavement of sandstone blocks bound with clay-gypsum mortar, covered by a layer of basaltic flagstones and had separate shoulders. This road could be considered superior to any Roman road. Roman roads varied from simple corduroy roads to paved roads using deep roadbeds of tamped rubble as an underlying layer to ensure that they kept dry, as the water would flow out from between the stones and fragments of rubble, instead of becoming mud in clay soils.

Although there were attempts to rediscover Roman methods, there was little useful innovation in road building before the 18th century. The first professional road builder to emerge during the Industrial Revolution was John Metcalf, who constructed about 290 kilometres (180 mi) of turnpike road, mainly in the north of England, from 1765, when Parliament passed an act authorising the creation of turnpike trusts to build toll funded roads in the Knaresborough area.

Pierre-Marie-Jérôme Trésaguet is widely credited with establishing the first scientific approach to road building in France at the same time as Metcalf. He wrote a memorandum on his method in 1775, which became general practice in France. It involved a layer of large rocks, covered by a layer of smaller gravel.

By the late 18th and early 19th centuries, new methods of highway construction had been pioneered by the work of two British engineers: Thomas Telford and John Loudon McAdam. Telford's method of road building involved the digging of a large trench in which a foundation of heavy rock was set. He designed his roads so that they sloped downwards from the centre, allowing drainage to take place, a major improvement on the work of Trésaguet. The surface of his roads consisted of broken stone. McAdam developed an inexpensive paving material of soil and stone aggregate (known as macadam). His road building method was simpler than Telford's, yet more effective at protecting roadways: he discovered that massive foundations of rock upon rock were unnecessary, and asserted that native soil alone would support the road and traffic upon it, as long as it was covered by a road crust that would protect the soil underneath from water and wear. Size of stones was central to McAdam's road building theory. The lower 200-millimetre (7.9 in) road thickness was restricted to stones no larger than 75 millimetres (3.0 in).

Modern tarmac was patented by British civil engineer Edgar Purnell Hooley, who noticed that spilled tar on the roadway kept the dust down and created a smooth surface. He took out a patent in 1901 for tarmac. Hooley's 1901 patent for tarmac involved mechanically mixing tar and aggregate prior to lay-down, and then compacting the mixture with a steamroller. The tar was modified by adding small amounts of Portland cement, resin, and pitch.

== Asphalt ==
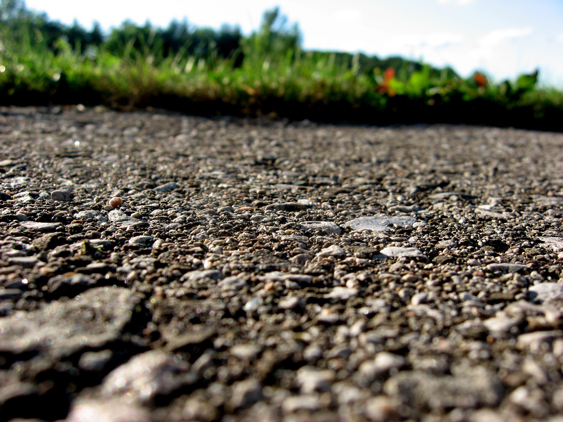
Closeup of asphalt on a driveway

Asphalt (specifically, asphalt concrete), sometimes called flexible pavement since its viscosity causes minute deformations as it distributes loads, has been widely used since the 1920s. The viscous nature of the bitumen binder allows asphalt concrete to sustain significant plastic deformation, although fatigue from repeated loading over time is the most common failure mechanism. Most asphalt surfaces are laid on a gravel base, which is generally at least as thick as the asphalt layer, although some 'full depth' asphalt surfaces are laid directly on the native subgrade. In areas with very soft or expansive subgrades such as clay or peat, thick gravel bases or stabilization of the subgrade with Portland cement or lime may be required. Polypropylene and polyester geosynthetics are also used for this purpose, and in some northern countries a layer of polystyrene boards are used to delay and minimize frost penetration into the subgrade.

Depending on the temperature at which it is applied, asphalt is categorized as hot mix, warm mix, half warm mix, or cold mix. Hot mix asphalt is applied at temperatures over 150 °C (300 °F) with a free floating screed. Warm mix asphalt is applied at temperatures of 95–120 °C (200–250 °F), resulting in reduced energy usage and emissions of volatile organic compounds. Cold mix asphalt is often used on lower-volume rural roads, where hot mix asphalt would cool too much on the long trip from the asphalt plant to the construction site.

An asphalt concrete surface will generally be constructed for high-volume primary highways having an average annual daily traffic load greater than 1,200 vehicles per day. Advantages of asphalt roadways include relatively low noise, relatively low cost compared with other paving methods, and perceived ease of repair. Disadvantages include less durability than other paving methods, less tensile strength than concrete, the tendency to become slick and soft in hot weather, and a certain amount of hydrocarbon pollution to soil and groundwater or waterways.

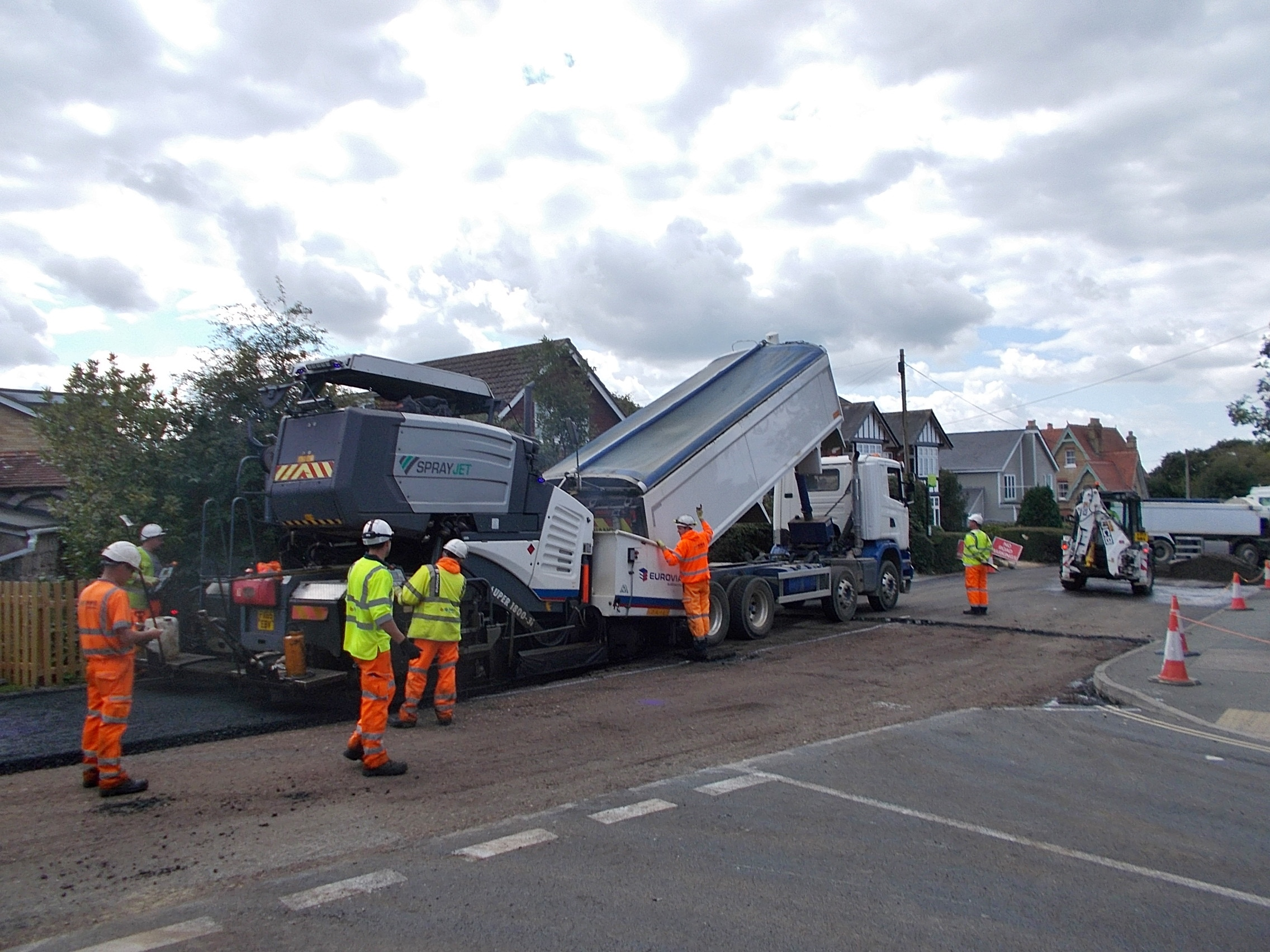
Laying asphalt

In the mid-1960s, rubberized asphalt was used for the first time, mixing crumb rubber from used tires with asphalt. While a potential use for tires that would otherwise fill landfills and present a fire hazard, rubberized asphalt has shown greater incidence of wear in freeze-thaw cycles in temperate zones because of the non-homogeneous expansion and contraction with non-rubber components. The application of rubberized asphalt is more temperature-sensitive and in many locations can only be applied at certain times of the year. Study results of the long-term acoustic benefits of rubberized asphalt are inconclusive. Initial application of rubberized asphalt may provide a reduction of 3–5 decibels (dB) in tire-pavement-source noise emissions; however, this translates to only 1–3 dB in total traffic-noise reduction when combined with the other components of traffic noise. Compared to traditional passive attenuating measures (e.g., noise walls and earth berms), rubberized asphalt provides shorter-lasting and lesser acoustic benefits at typically much greater expense.

Performance evaluation of road surfaces increasingly relies on full-scale accelerated testing methods, such as heavy vehicle simulators (HVS) and circular road simulators. These systems apply repeated traffic loading under controlled conditions, allowing researchers to study pavement response and deterioration over compressed time periods relative to long-term field observations. Heavy vehicle simulators are used to reproduce the effects of cumulative traffic loads on full-scale pavement structures, supporting assessment of structural integrity, deformation behaviour, and maintenance strategies for different material compositions. Similarly, circular road simulators enable simultaneous testing of multiple pavement materials within a single controlled environment, offering insights into how repeated wheel loading influences wear, rutting, and other surface performance parameters. Studies have used both types of simulators to assess the durability and mechanical behaviour of asphalt mixtures produced with industrial by-products, demonstrating their potential for sustainable road construction and material optimization.

== Concrete ==
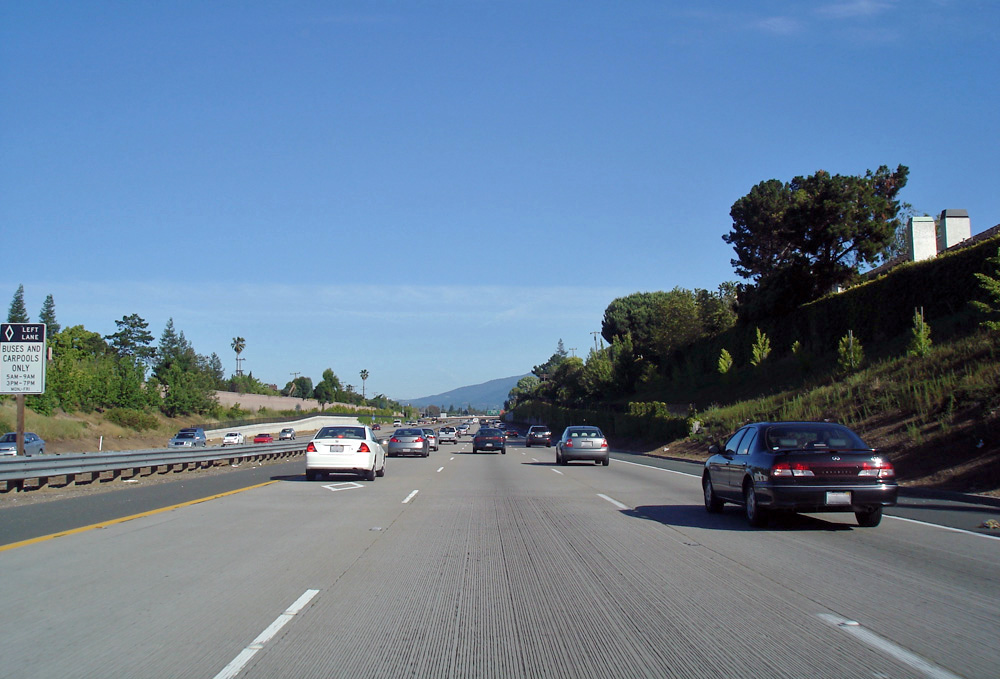
Concrete roadway in San Jose, California

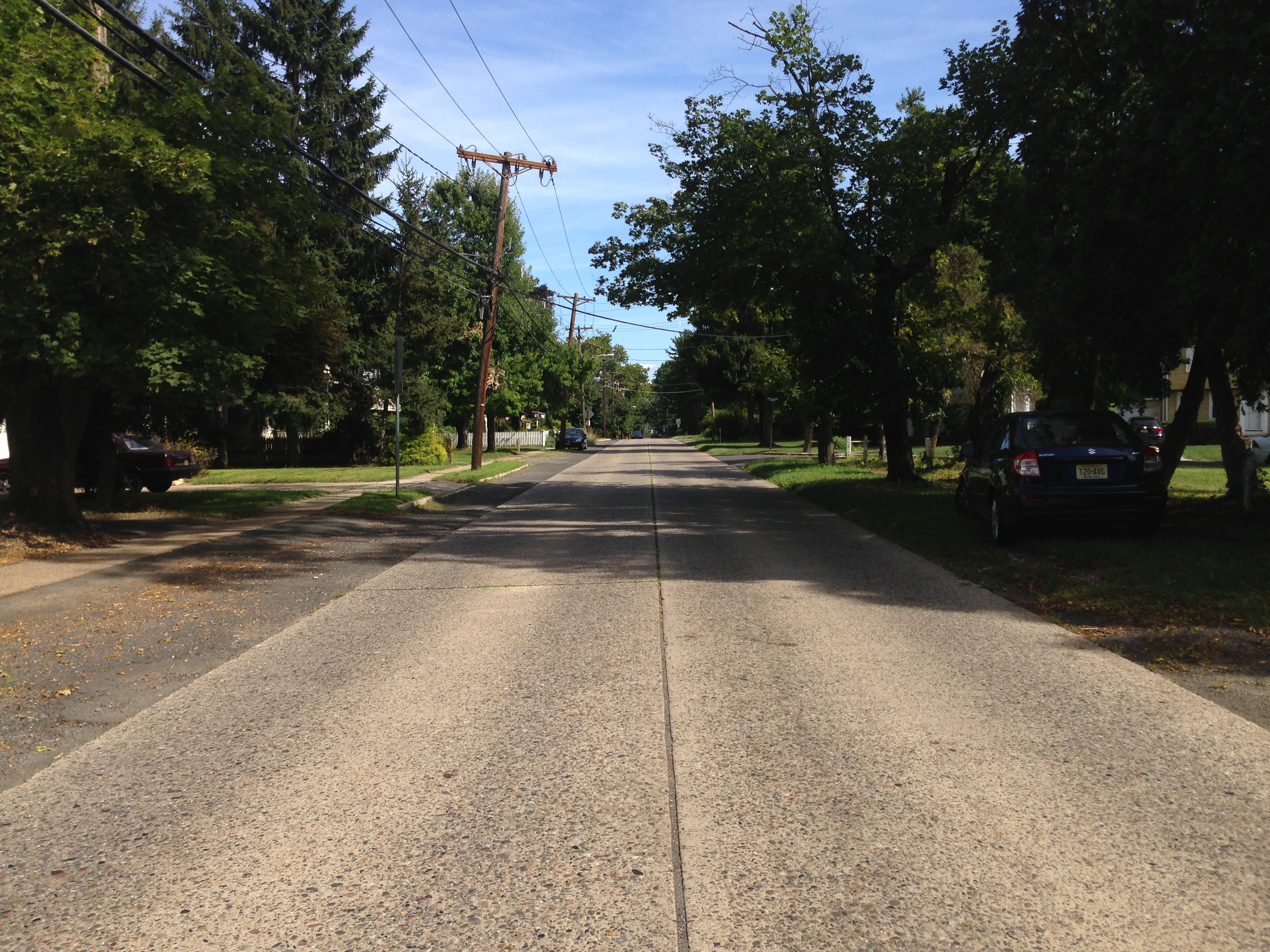
A concrete road in Ewing, New Jersey

Concrete surfaces (specifically, Portland cement concrete) are created using a concrete mix of Portland cement, coarse aggregate, sand, and water. In virtually all modern mixes there will also be various admixtures added to increase workability, reduce the required amount of water, mitigate harmful chemical reactions, and for other beneficial purposes. In many cases there will also be Portland cement substitutes added, such as fly ash. This can reduce the cost of the concrete and improve its physical properties. The material is applied in a freshly mixed slurry and worked mechanically to compact the interior and force some of the cement slurry to the surface to produce a smoother, denser surface free from honeycombing. The water allows the mix to combine molecularly in a chemical reaction called hydration.

Concrete surfaces have been classified into three common types: jointed plain (JPCP), jointed reinforced (JRCP) and continuously reinforced (CRCP). The one item that distinguishes each type is the jointing system used to control crack development.

One of the major advantages of concrete pavements is they are typically stronger and more durable than asphalt roadways. The surface can be grooved to provide a durable skid-resistant surface. Concrete roads are more economical to drive in terms of fuel consumption, they reflect light better, and they last significantly longer than other paving surfaces; but they have a much smaller market share than other paving solutions. Modern paving methods and design methods have changed the economics of concrete paving so that a well-designed and placed concrete pavement will be cheaper in initial cost and significantly cheaper over the life cycle. Another important advantage is that waterproof concrete can be used, which eliminates the need to place storm drains next to the road and reduces the need for a slightly sloped driveway to drain rainwater. Avoiding rainwater discharge by using runoff also means less electricity is needed (otherwise more pumps would be needed in the water distribution system) and rainwater is not polluted because it no longer mixes with polluted water. Rather, it is immediately absorbed by the earth. A previous disadvantage was that they had a higher initial cost and could be more time-consuming to construct. This cost can typically be offset through the long life cycle of the pavement and the higher cost of bitumen. Concrete pavement can be maintained over time utilizing a series of methods known as concrete pavement restoration which include diamond grinding, dowel bar retrofits, joint and crack sealing, and cross-stitching. Diamond grinding is also useful in reducing noise and restoring skid resistance in older concrete pavement.

The first street in the United States to be paved with concrete was Court Avenue in Bellefontaine, Ohio, in 1893. The first mile of concrete pavement in the United States was on Woodward Avenue in Detroit, Michigan, in 1909. Following these pioneering uses, the Lincoln Highway Association, established in October 1913 to oversee the creation of one of the United States' earliest east–west transcontinental highways for the automobile, began to establish "seedling miles" of specifically concrete-paved roadbed in various places in the American Midwest, starting in 1914 west of Malta, Illinois, while using concrete with the specified concrete "ideal section" for the Lincoln Highway in Lake County, Indiana, during 1922 and 1923.

Concrete roadways may produce more noise than asphalt from tire noise on cracks and expansion joints. A concrete pavement composed of multiple slabs of uniform size will produce a periodic sound and vibration in each vehicle as its tires pass over each expansion joint. These monotonous repeated sounds and vibrations can cause a fatiguing or hypnotic effect upon the driver over the course of a long journey.

== Composite pavement ==
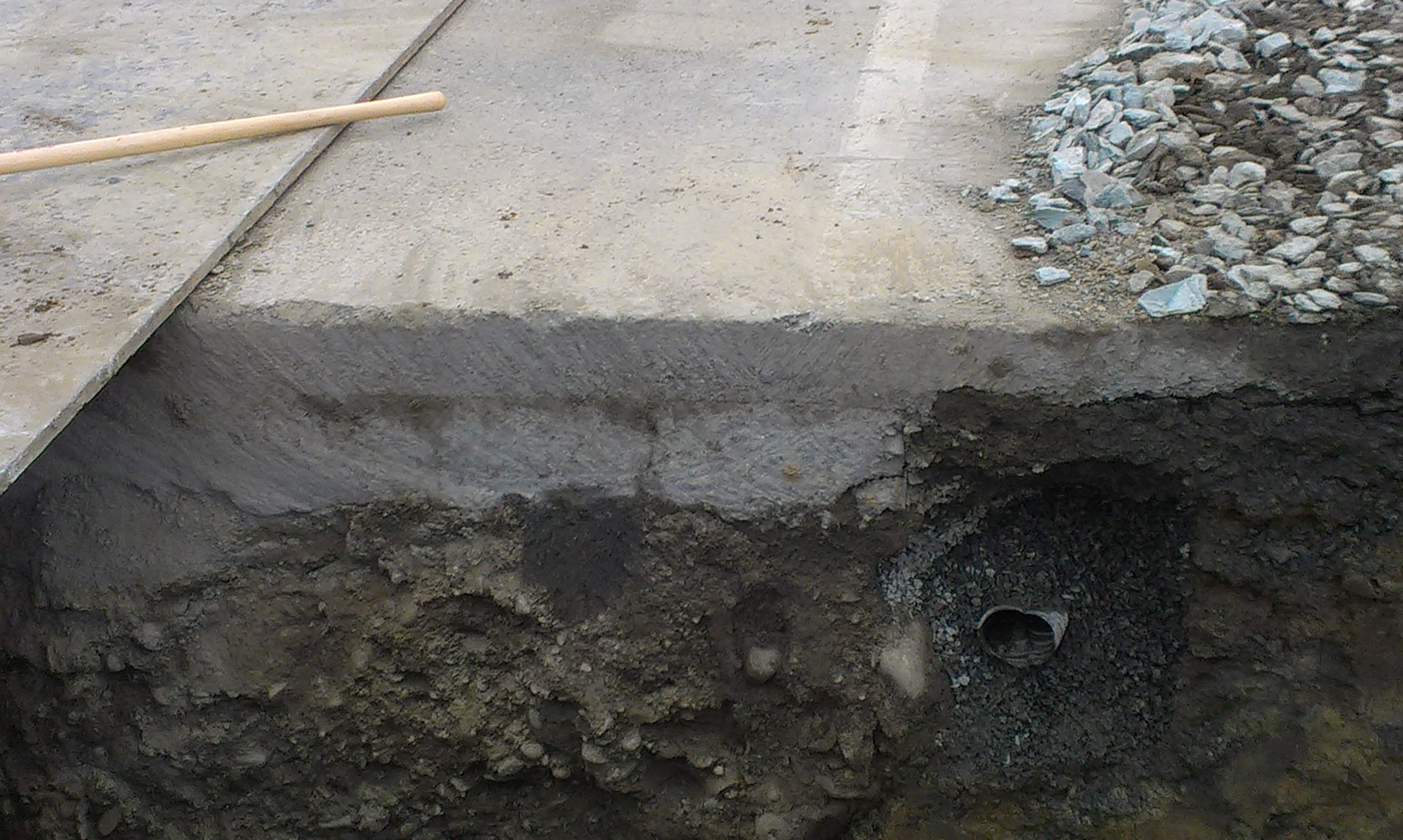
An example of composite pavement: hot-mix asphalt overlaid onto Portland cement concrete pavement

Composite pavements combine a Portland cement concrete sublayer with an asphalt overlay. They are usually used to rehabilitate existing roadways rather than in new construction. Asphalt overlays are sometimes laid over distressed concrete to restore a smooth wearing surface. A disadvantage of this method is that movement in the joints between the underlying concrete slabs, whether from thermal expansion and contraction, or from deflection of the concrete slabs from truck axle loads, usually causes reflective cracks in the asphalt.

To decrease reflective cracking, concrete pavement is broken apart through a break and seat, crack and seat, or rubblization process. Geosynthetics can be used for reflective crack control. With break and seat and crack and seat processes, a heavy weight is dropped on the concrete to induce cracking, then a heavy roller is used to seat the resultant pieces into the subbase. The main difference between the two processes is the equipment used to break the concrete pavement and the size of the resulting pieces. The theory is that frequent small cracks will spread thermal stress over a wider area than infrequent large joints, reducing the stress on the overlying asphalt pavement. "Rubblization" is a more complete fracturing of the old, worn-out concrete, effectively converting the old pavement into an aggregate base for a new asphalt road.

The whitetopping process uses Portland cement concrete to resurface a distressed asphalt road.

== Recycling ==
An asphalt milling machine in Boise, Idaho

Distressed pavement can be reused when rehabilitating a roadway. The existing pavement is broken up and may be ground on-site through a process called milling. This pavement is commonly referred to as reclaimed asphalt pavement (RAP). RAP can be transported to an asphalt plant, where it will be stockpiled for use in new pavement mixes, or it may be recycled in-place using the techniques described below.

=== In-place recycling methods ===
- Rubblizing of pavement: Existing concrete pavement is milled into gravel-sized particles. Any steel reinforcing is removed, and the ground pavement is compacted to form the base and/or sub-base layers for new asphalt pavement. Ground pavement may also be compacted for use on gravel roads.
- Cold in-place recycling: Bituminous pavement is ground or milled into small particles. The asphalt millings are blended with asphalt emulsion, foamed bitumen, or soft bitumen to rejuvenate the aged asphalt binder. New aggregate may also be added. The resulting asphalt mix is paved and compacted. It may serve as the top pavement layer, or it may be overlaid with new asphalt after curing.
- Hot in-place recycling: Bituminous pavement is heated to 120–150 °C (250–300 °F), milled, combined with a rejuvenating agent and/or virgin asphalt binder, and compacted. It may then be overlaid with new asphalt concrete. This process typically recycles the top 50 mm (2 in) or less and may be used to correct surface defects, such as rutting or polishing. To preserve the condition of the asphalt binder and avoid excessive hydrocarbon emissions, heating is typically achieved gradually through the use of infrared or hot air heaters.
- Full depth reclamation: The full thickness of the asphalt pavement and underlying material is pulverized to provide a uniform blend of material. A binding agent or stabilizing material may be mixed in to form a base course for the new pavement, or it may be left unbound to form a sub-base course. Common binding agents include asphalt emulsion, fly ash, hydrated lime, Portland cement, and calcium chloride. Virgin aggregate, RAP, or crushed Portland cement may also be added to improve the gradation and mechanical properties of the mix. This technique is typically used to address structural failures in the pavement, such as alligator cracking, deep rutting, and shoulder drop-off.

== Bituminous surface ==
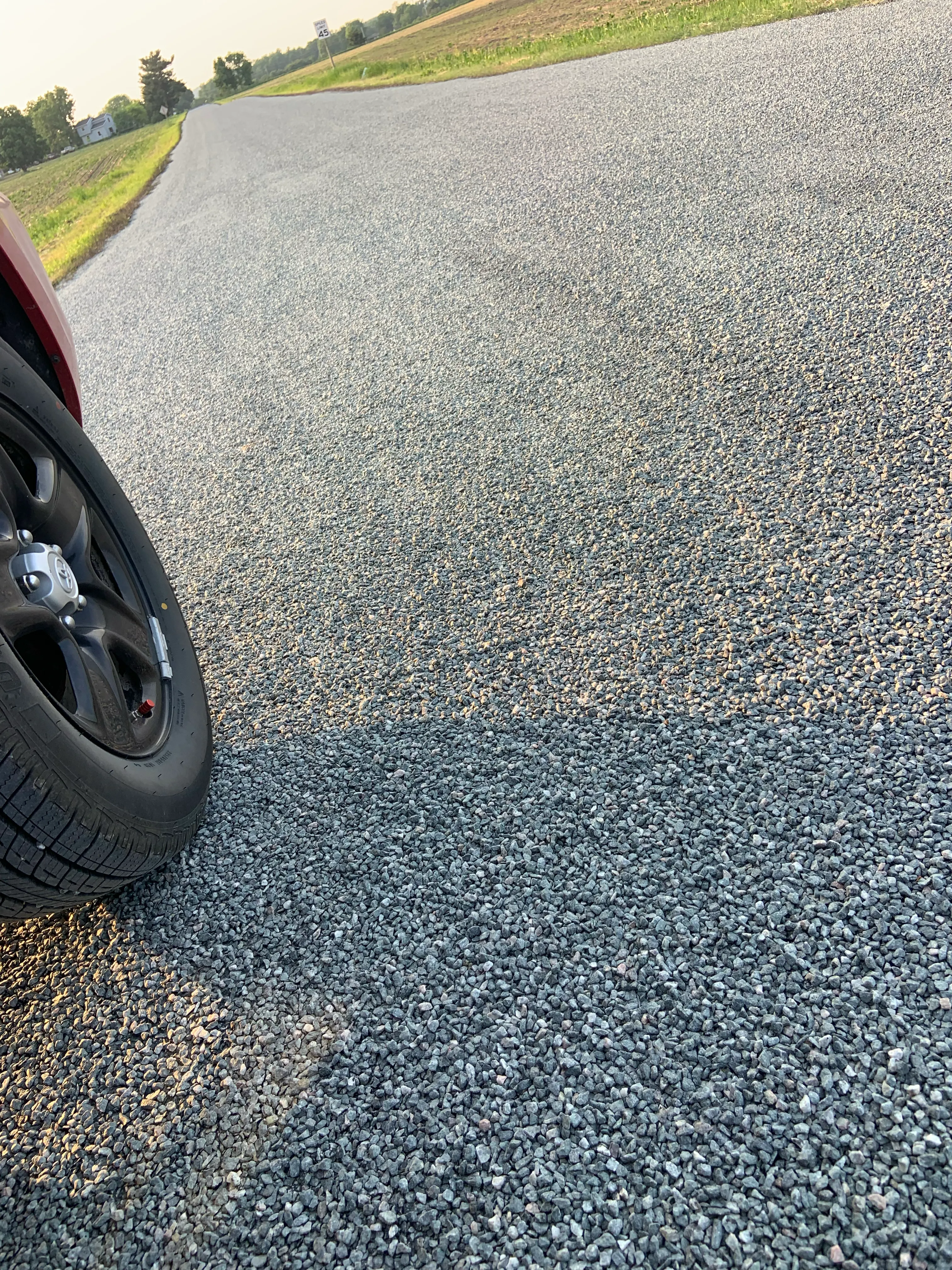
Newly installed chip seal surface on Ellsworth Road in Tomah, Wisconsin

Bituminous surface treatment (BST) or chipseal is used mainly on low-traffic roads, but also as a sealing coat to rejuvenate an asphalt concrete pavement. It generally consists of aggregate spread over a sprayed-on asphalt emulsion or cut-back asphalt cement. The aggregate is then embedded into the asphalt by rolling it, typically with a rubber-tired roller. This type of surface is described by a wide variety of regional terms including "chip seal", "tar and chip", "oil and stone", "seal coat", "sprayed seal", "surface dressing", "microsurfacing", "seal", or simply as "bitumen".

BST is used on hundreds of miles of the Alaska Highway and other similar roadways in Alaska, the Yukon Territory, and northern British Columbia. The ease of application of BST is one reason for its popularity, but another is its flexibility, which is important when roadways are laid down over unstable terrain that thaws and softens in the spring.

Other types of BSTs include micropaving, slurry seals and Novachip. These are laid down using specialized and proprietary equipment. They are most often used in urban areas where the roughness and loose stone associated with chip seals is considered undesirable.

=== Thin membrane surface ===
A thin membrane surface (TMS) is an oil-treated aggregate which is laid down upon a gravel road bed, producing a dust-free road. A TMS road reduces mud problems and provides stone-free roads for local residents where loaded truck traffic is negligible. The TMS layer adds no significant structural strength, and so is used on secondary highways with low traffic volume and minimal weight loading. Construction involves minimal subgrade preparation, following by covering with a 50-to-100-millimetre (2–4 in) cold mix asphalt aggregate. The Operation Division of the Ministry of Highways and Infrastructure in Saskatchewan has the responsibility of maintaining 6,102 kilometres (3,792 mi) of thin membrane surface (TMS) highways.

=== Otta seal ===
Otta seal is a low-cost road surface using a 16–30-millimetre-thick (5/8–1 1/8 in) mixture of bitumen and crushed rock.

== Gravel surface ==
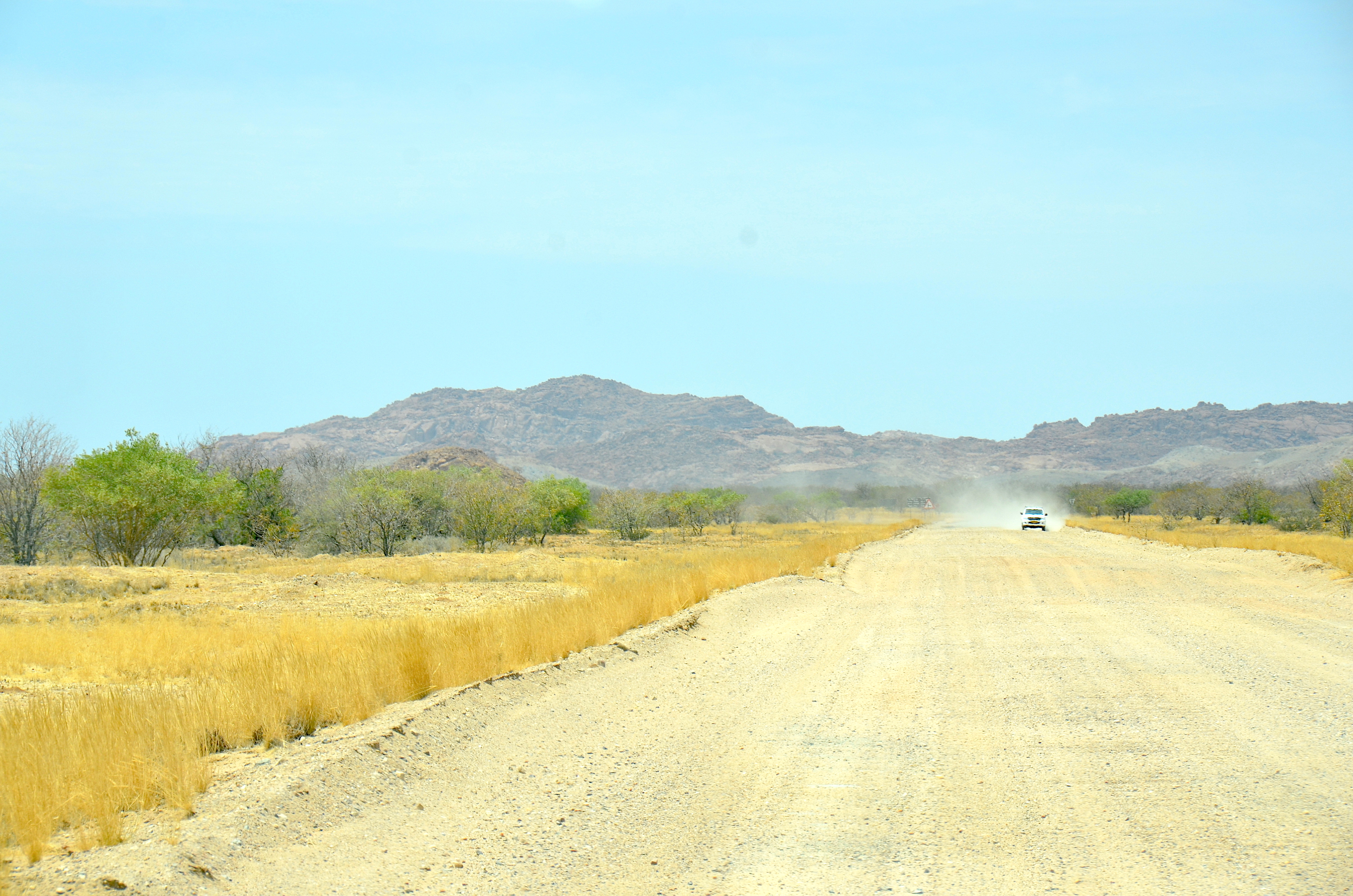
Gravel road in Namibia

Gravel is known to have been used extensively in the construction of roads by soldiers of the Roman Empire (see Roman road) but in 1998 a limestone-surfaced road, thought to date back to the Bronze Age, was found at Yarnton in Oxfordshire, Britain. Applying gravel, or "metalling", has had two distinct usages in road surfacing. The term road metal refers to the broken stone or cinders used in the construction or repair of roads or railways, and is derived from the Latin metallum, which means both "mine" and "quarry". The term originally referred to the process of creating a gravel roadway. The route of the roadway would first be dug down several feet and, depending on local conditions, French drains may or may not have been added. Next, large stones were placed and compacted, followed by successive layers of smaller stones, until the road surface was composed of small stones compacted into a hard, durable surface. "Road metal" later became the name of stone chippings mixed with tar to form the road-surfacing material tarmac. A road of such material is called a "metalled road" in Britain, a "paved road" in Canada and the US, or a "sealed road" in parts of Canada, Australia and New Zealand.

A granular surface can be used with a traffic volume where the annual average daily traffic is 1,200 vehicles per day or less. There is some structural strength if the road surface combines a sub base and base and is topped with a double-graded seal aggregate with emulsion. Besides the 4,929 kilometres (3,063 mi) of granular pavements maintained in Saskatchewan, around 40% of New Zealand roads are unbound granular pavement structures.

The decision whether to pave a gravel road or not often hinges on traffic volume. It has been found that maintenance costs for gravel roads often exceed the maintenance costs for paved or surface-treated roads when traffic volumes exceed 200 vehicles per day. Despite this, different jurisdictions set and follow different guidelines; for example, the state of Vermont recommends considering to pave a gravel road only at 500 vehicles per day.

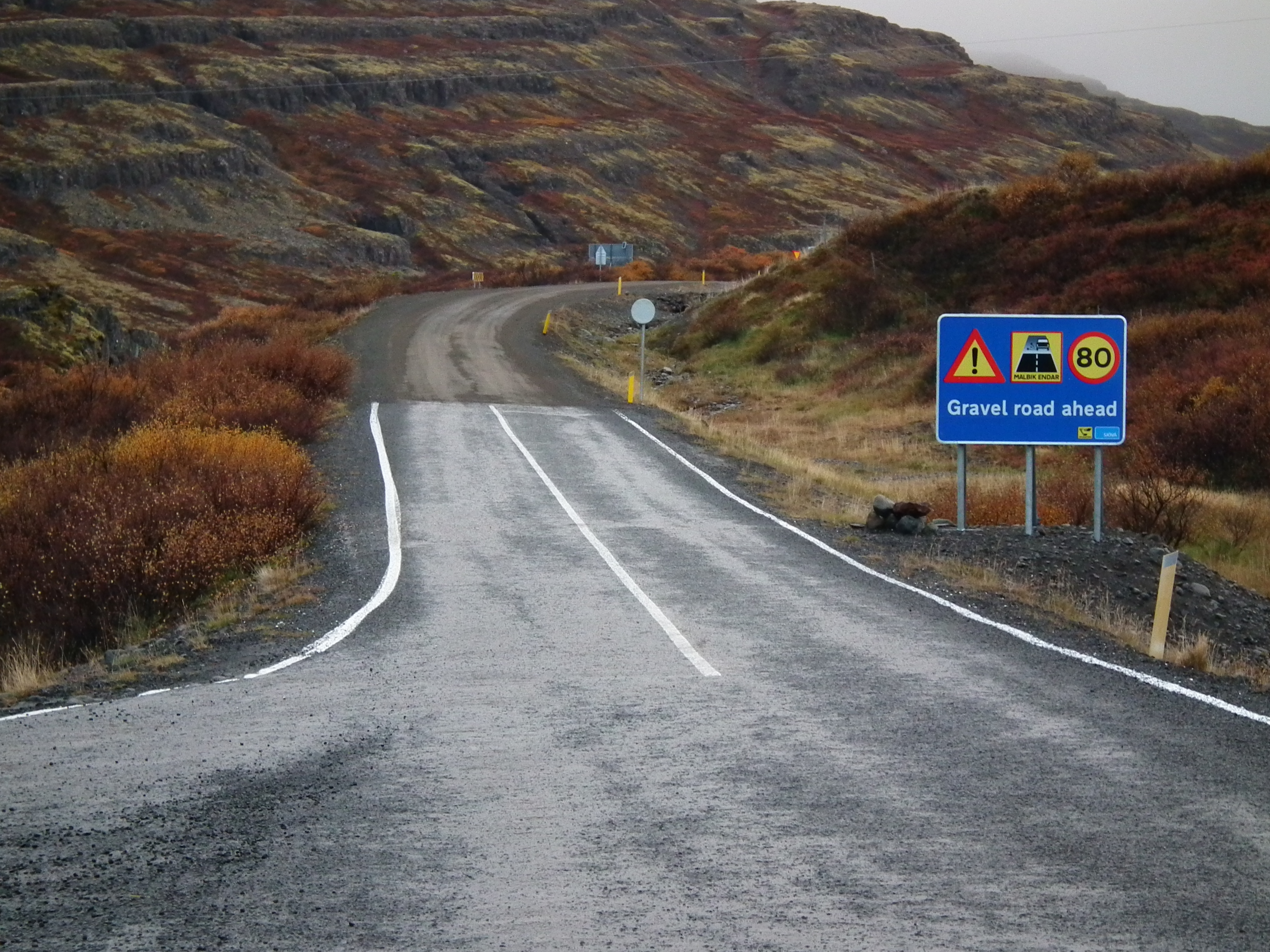
Pavement ends and turns into gravel surface road.

Some communities are finding it makes sense to convert their low-volume paved roads to aggregate surfaces.

== Other surfaces ==
Pavers (or paviours), generally in the form of pre-cast concrete blocks, are often used for aesthetic purposes, or sometimes at port facilities that see long-duration pavement loading. Pavers are rarely used in areas that see high-speed vehicle traffic.

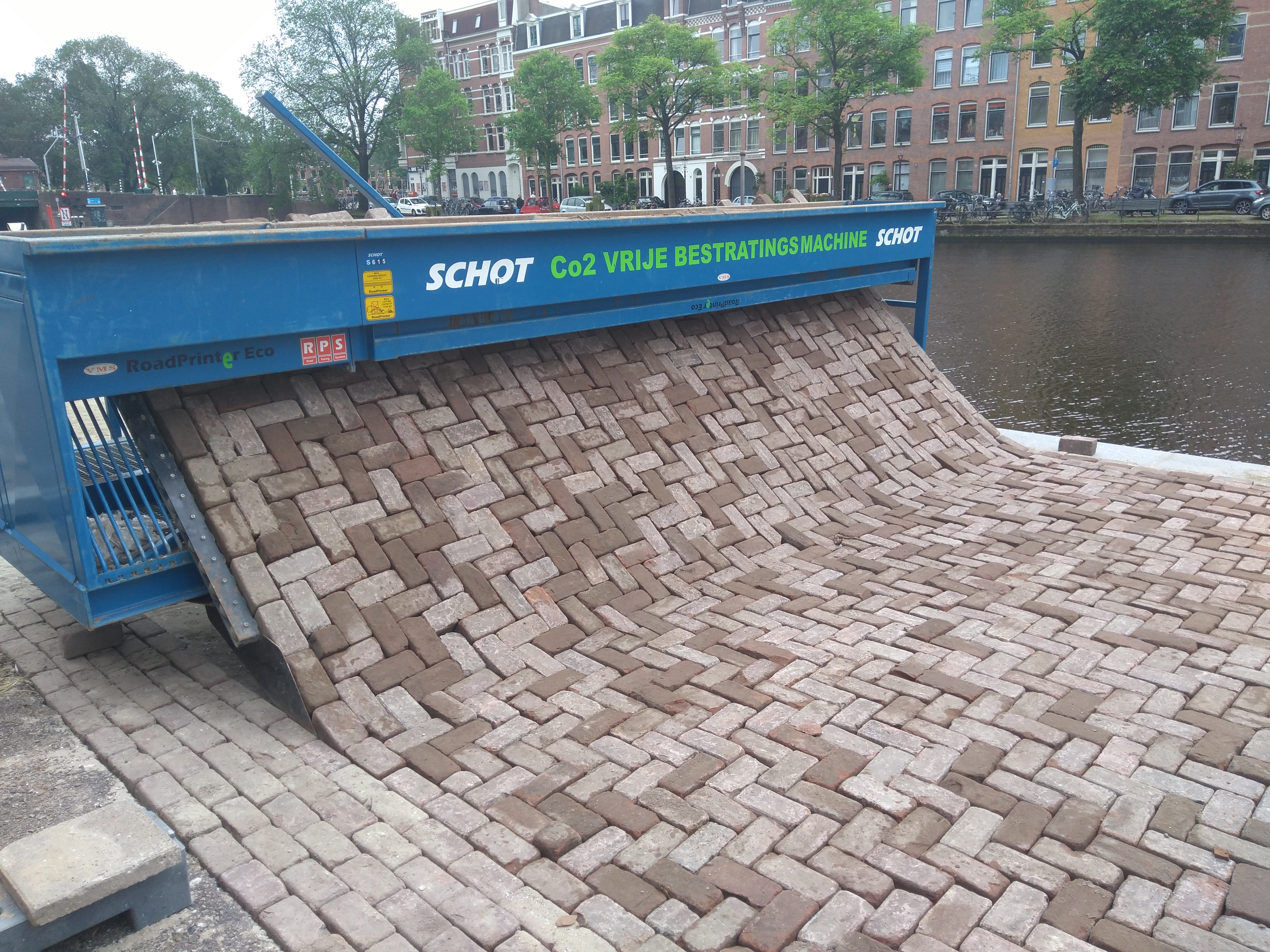
Brick paving machine

Brick, cobblestone, sett, wood plank, and wood block pavements such as Nicolson pavement, were once common in urban areas throughout the world, but fell out of fashion in most countries, due to the high cost of labor required to lay and maintain them, and are typically only kept for historical or aesthetic reasons. In some countries, however, they are still common in local streets. In the Netherlands, brick paving has made something of a comeback since the adoption of a major nationwide traffic safety program in 1997. From 1998 through 2007, more than 41,000 km of city streets were converted to local access roads with a speed limit of 30 km/h, for the purpose of traffic calming. One popular measure is to use brick paving - the noise and vibration slows motorists down. At the same time, it is not uncommon for cycle paths alongside a road to have a smoother surface than the road itself.

Although rarely constructed today, early-style macadam and tarmac pavements are sometimes found beneath modern asphalt concrete or Portland cement concrete pavements, because the cost of their removal at the time of renovation would not significantly benefit the durability and longevity of the newer surface.

There are ways to create the appearance of brick pavement, without the expense of actual bricks. The first method to create brick texture is to heat an asphalt pavement and use metal wires to imprint a brick pattern using a compactor to create stamped asphalt. A similar method is to use rubber imprinting tools to press over a thin layer of cement to create decorative concrete. Another method is to use a brick pattern stencil and apply a surfacing material over the stencil. Materials that can be applied to give the color of the brick and skid resistance can be in many forms. An example is to use colored polymer-modified concrete slurry which can be applied by screeding or spraying. Another material is aggregate-reinforced thermoplastic which can be heat applied to the top layer of the brick-pattern surface. Other coating materials over stamped asphalt are paints and two-part epoxy coating.

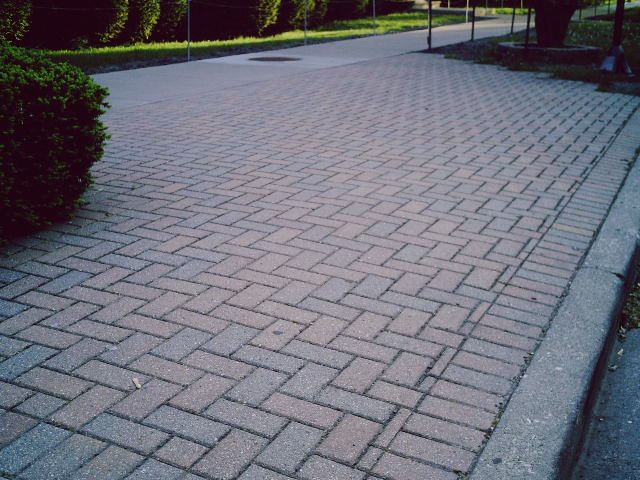
Concrete pavers

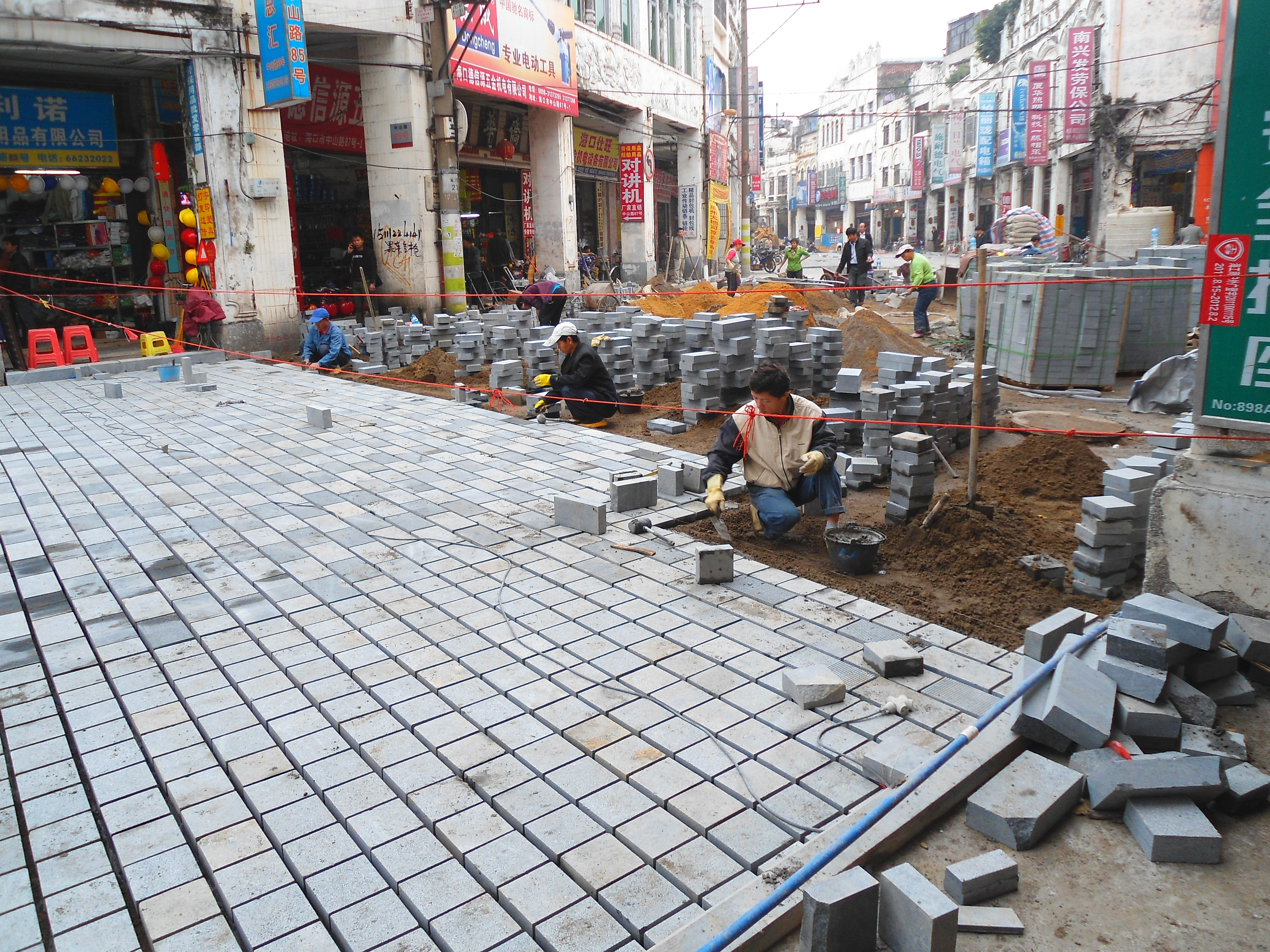
Replacing the old road with concrete blocks in Bo'ao Road area, Haikou City, Hainan, China

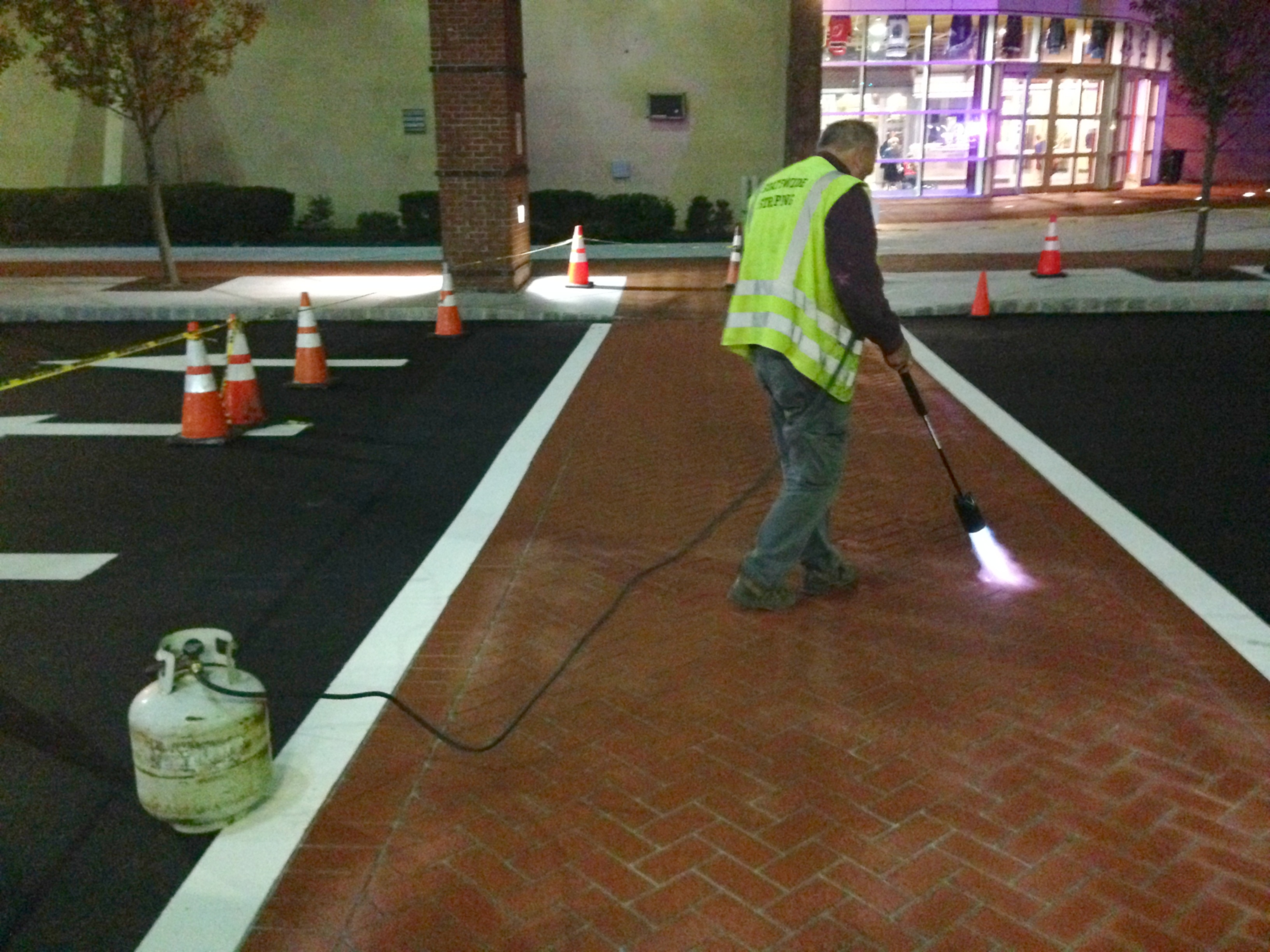
Polymer cement overlaying to change asphalt pavement to brick texture and color to create decorative crosswalk

== Acoustical implications ==
Roadway surfacing choices are known to affect the intensity and spectrum of sound emanating from the tire/surface interaction. Initial applications of noise studies occurred in the early 1970s. Noise phenomena are highly influenced by vehicle speed.

Roadway surface types contribute differential noise effects of up to 4 dB, with chip seal type and grooved roads being the loudest, and concrete surfaces without spacers being the quietest. Asphaltic surfaces perform intermediately relative to concrete and chip seal. Rubberized asphalt has been shown to give a 3–5 dB reduction in tire-pavement noise emissions, and a marginally discernible 1–3 dB reduction in total road noise emissions when compared to conventional asphalt applications.

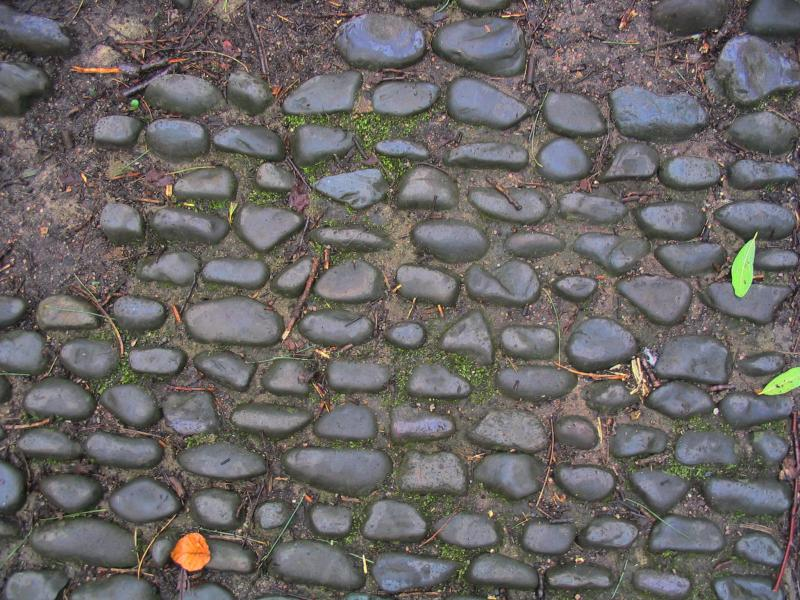
Cobbles

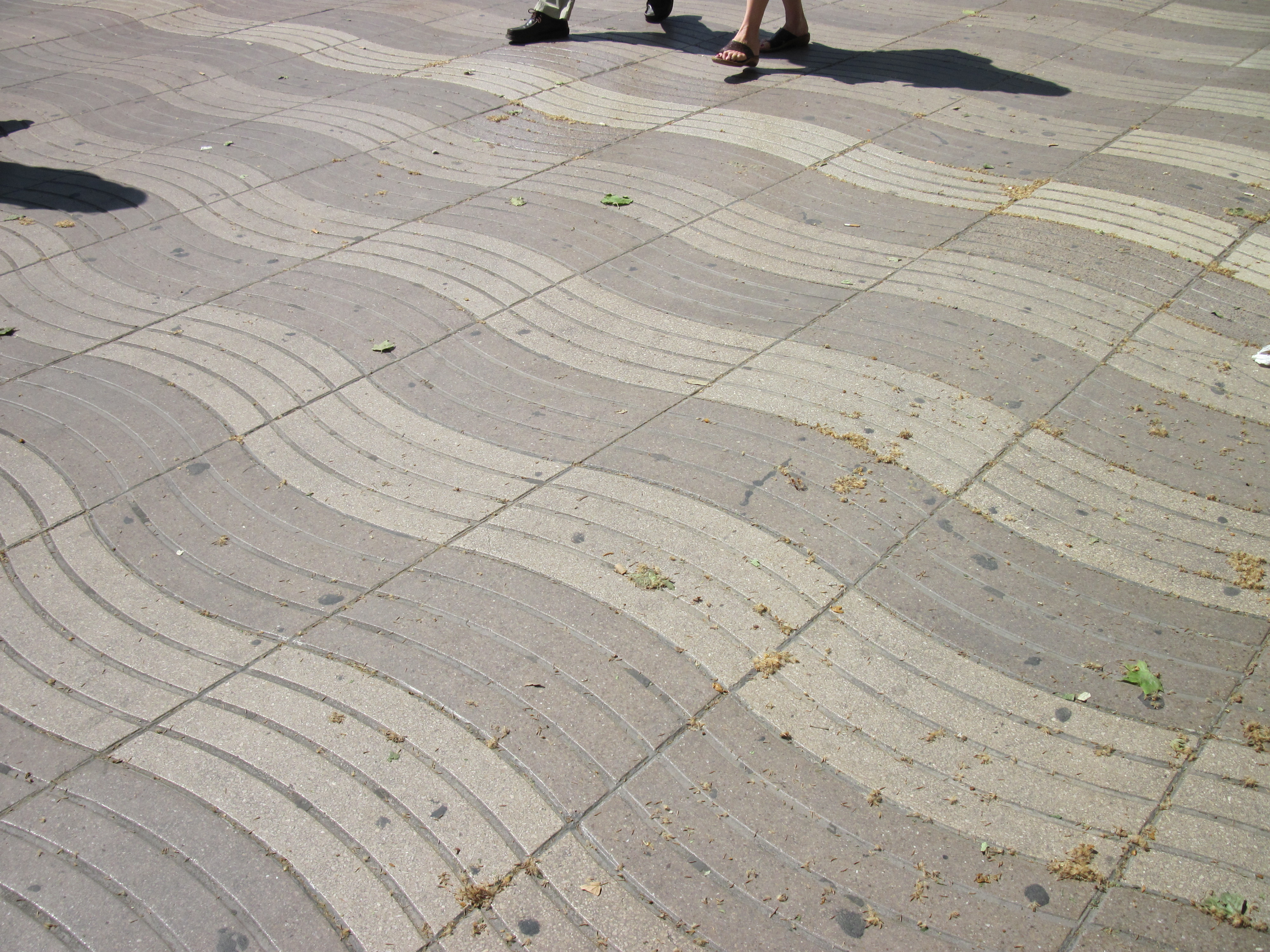
Decorative wavy pattern on La Rambla

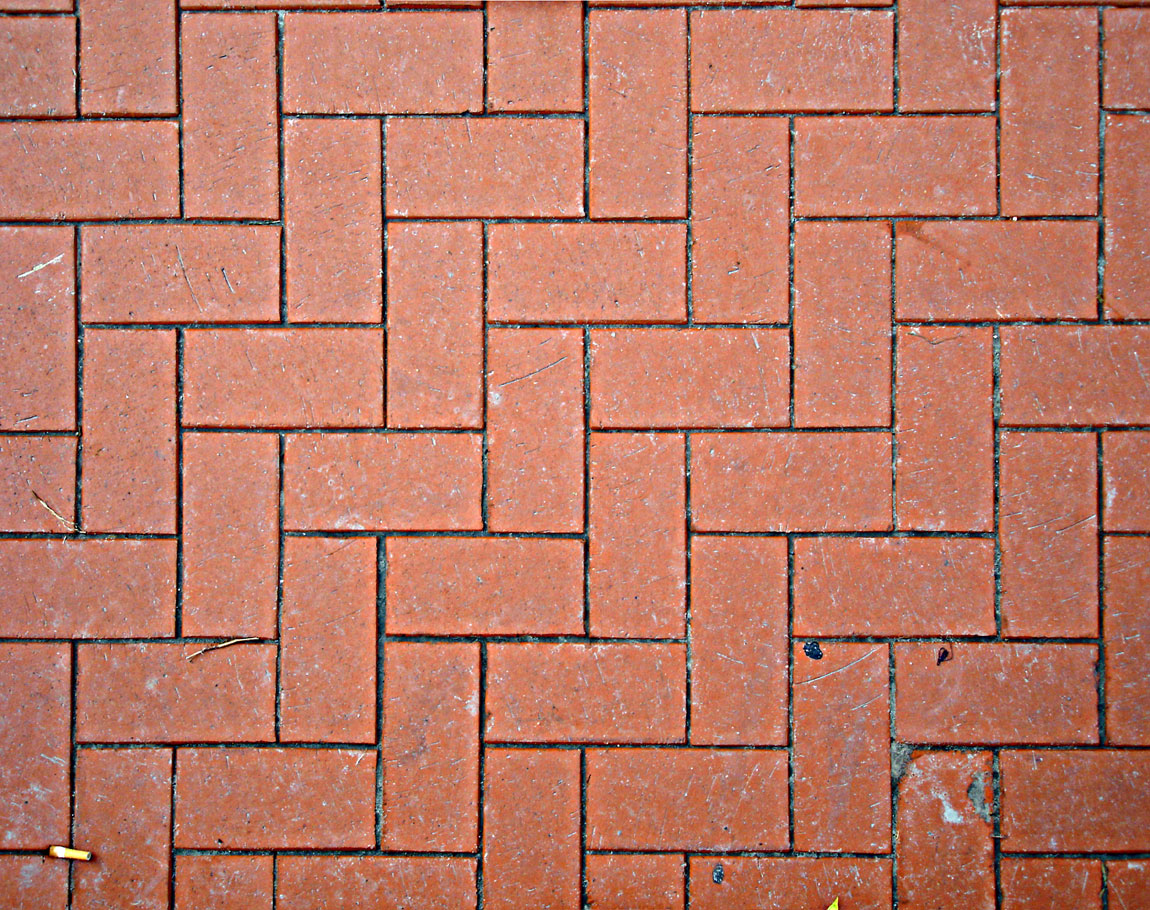
Decorative mock-brick pattern

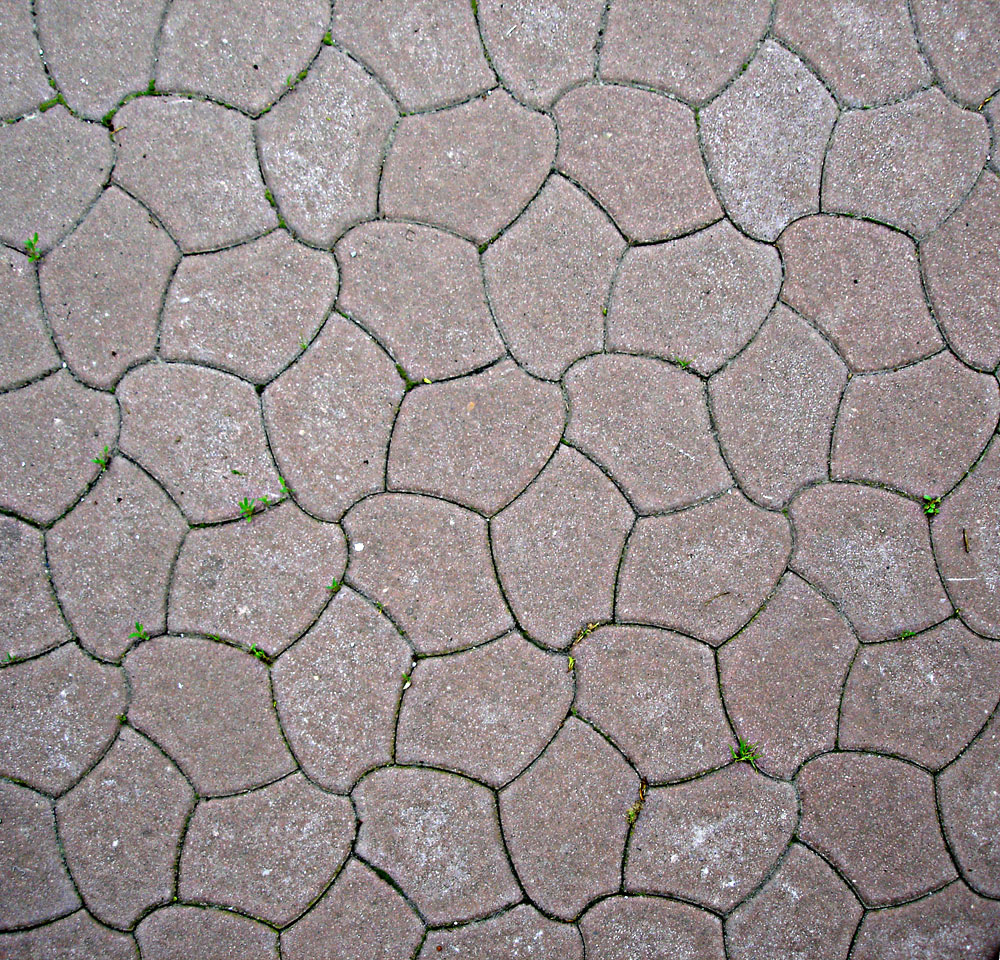
Decorative pentagonal brickwork pattern

== Surface deterioration ==
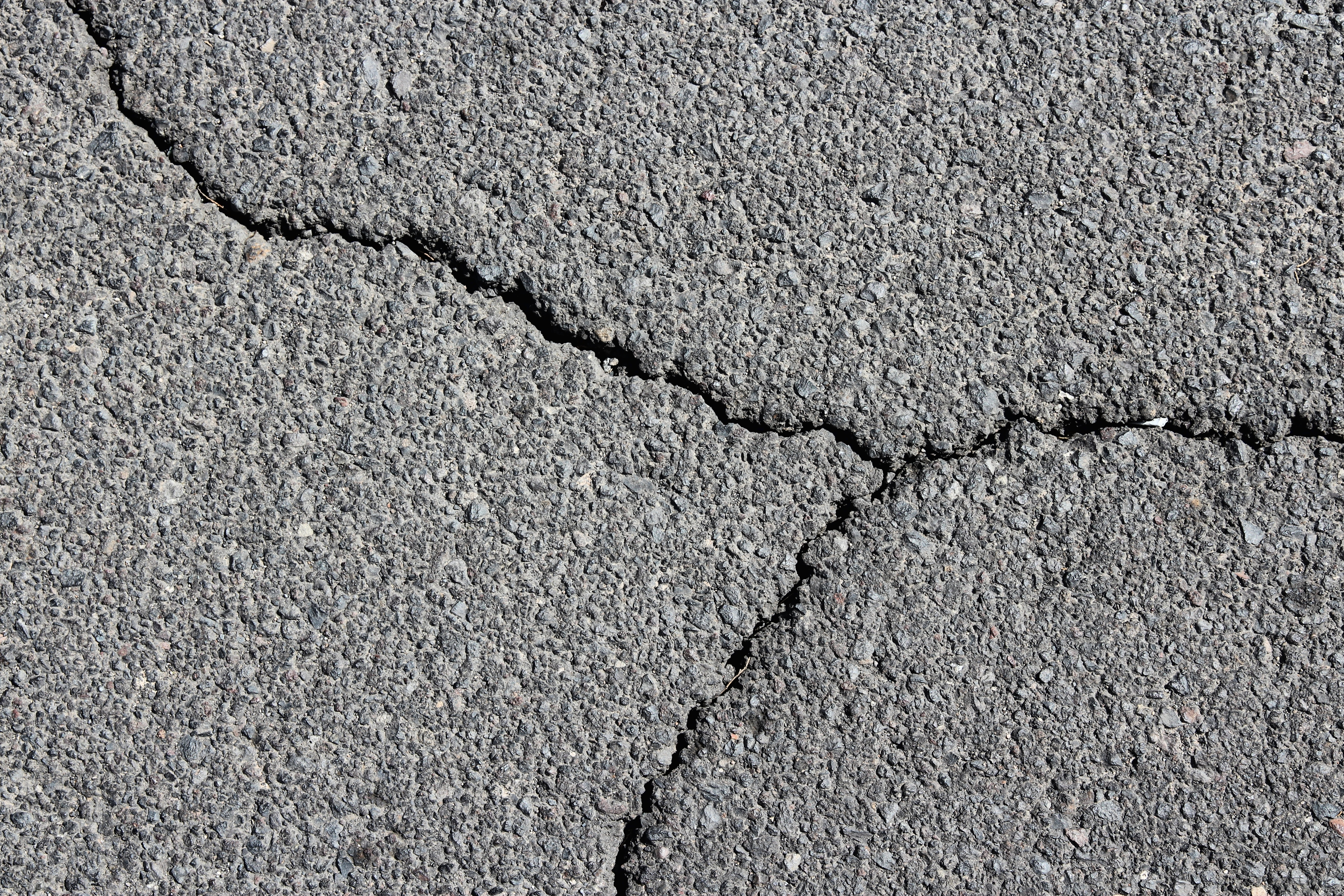
Cracked asphalt surface

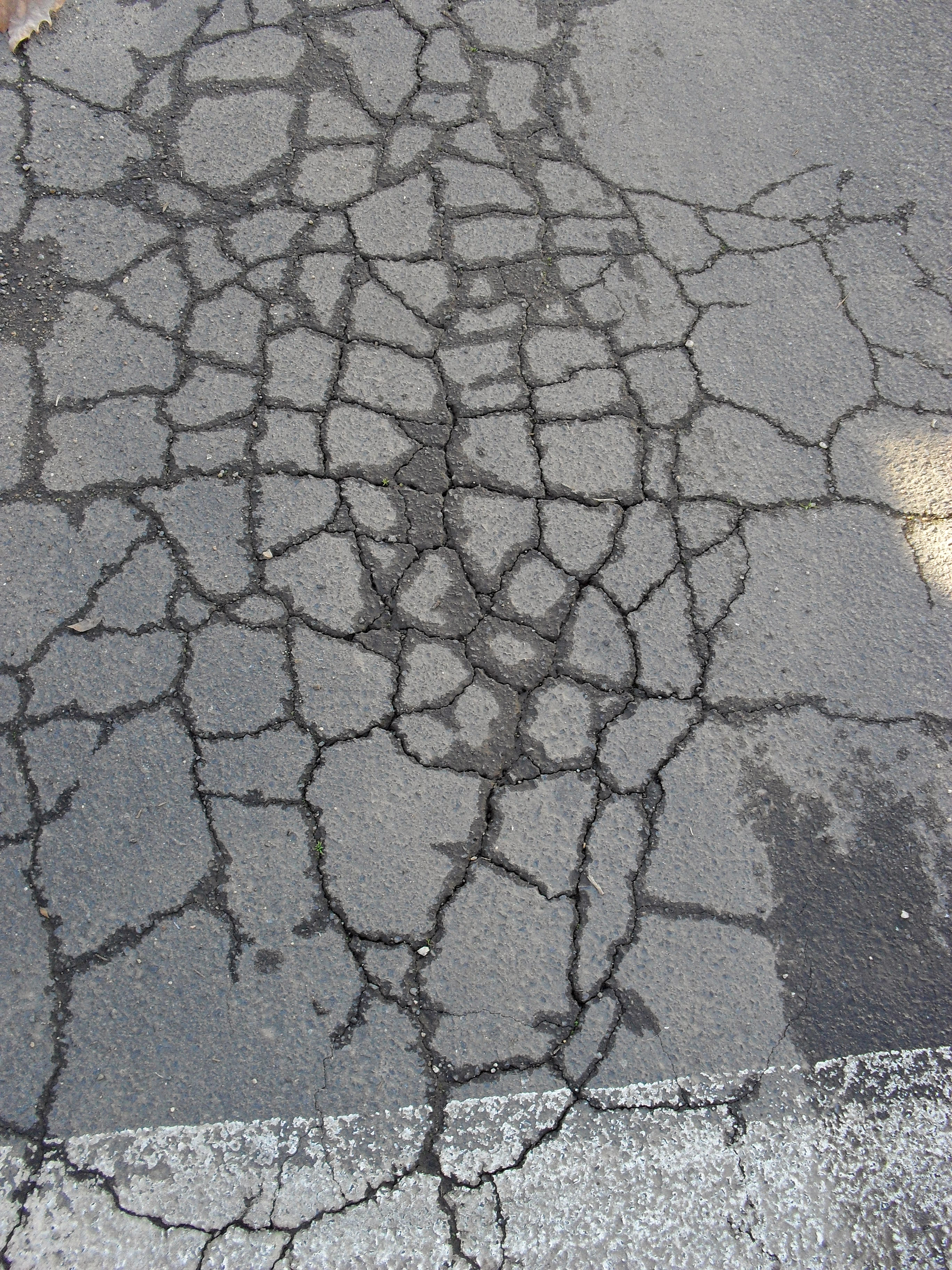
Deteriorating asphalt

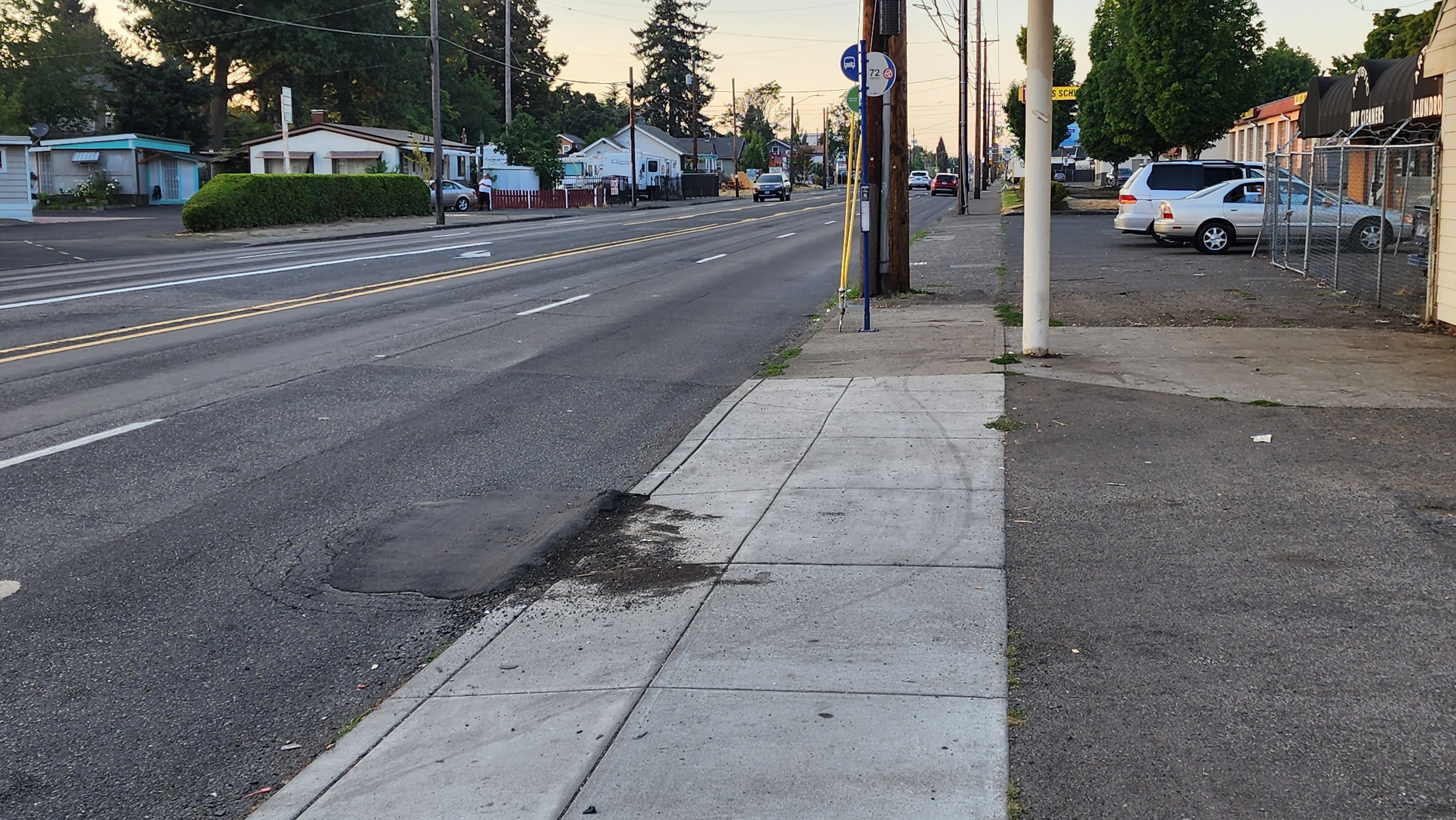
A patched road rut at a Portland Oregon bus stop. During the summer this part of the road will be hot and combined with a bus's high ground pressure will compress and deform part of the road. Due to the lower elevation from the driveway, a large portion of the buses weight leans on one wheel causing damage to the road. Despite the repairs, you can see the patch is already damaged. This happens yearly.

As pavement systems primarily fail due to fatigue (in a manner similar to metals), the damage done to pavement increases with the fourth power of the axle load of the vehicles traveling on it. According to the AASHO Road Test, heavily loaded trucks can do more than 10,000 times the damage done by a normal passenger car. Tax rates for trucks are higher than those for cars in most countries for this reason, though they are not levied in proportion to the damage done. Passenger cars are considered to have little practical effect on a pavement's service life, from a materials fatigue perspective.

Other failure modes include aging and surface abrasion. As years go by, the binder in a bituminous wearing course gets stiffer and less flexible. When it gets "old" enough, the surface will start losing aggregates, and macrotexture depth increases dramatically. If no maintenance action is done quickly on the wearing course, potholes will form. The freeze-thaw cycle in cold climates will dramatically accelerate pavement deterioration, once water can penetrate the surface. Clay and fumed silica nanoparticles may potentially be used as efficient UV-anti aging coatings in asphalt pavements.

If the road is still structurally sound, a bituminous surface treatment, such as a chipseal or surface dressing can prolong the life of the road at low cost. In areas with cold climate, studded tires may be allowed on passenger cars. In Sweden and Finland, studded passenger car tires account for a very large share of pavement rutting.

The physical properties of a stretch of pavement can be tested using a falling weight deflectometer.

Several design methods have been developed to determine the thickness and composition of road surfaces required to carry predicted traffic loads for a given period of time. Pavement design methods are continuously evolving. Among these are the Shell Pavement design method, and the American Association of State Highway and Transportation Officials (AASHTO) 1993/98 "Guide for Design of Pavement Structures". A mechanistic-empirical design guide was developed through the NCHRP process, resulting in the Mechanistic Empirical Pavement Design Guide (MEPDG), which was adopted by AASHTO in 2008, although MEPDG implementation by state departments of transportation has been slow.

Further research by University College London into pavements has led to the development of an indoor, 80-sq-metre artificial pavement at a research centre called Pedestrian Accessibility and Movement Environment Laboratory (PAMELA). It is used to simulate everyday scenarios, from different pavement users to varying pavement conditions. There also exists a research facility near Auburn University, the NCAT Pavement Test Track, that is used to test experimental asphalt pavements for durability.

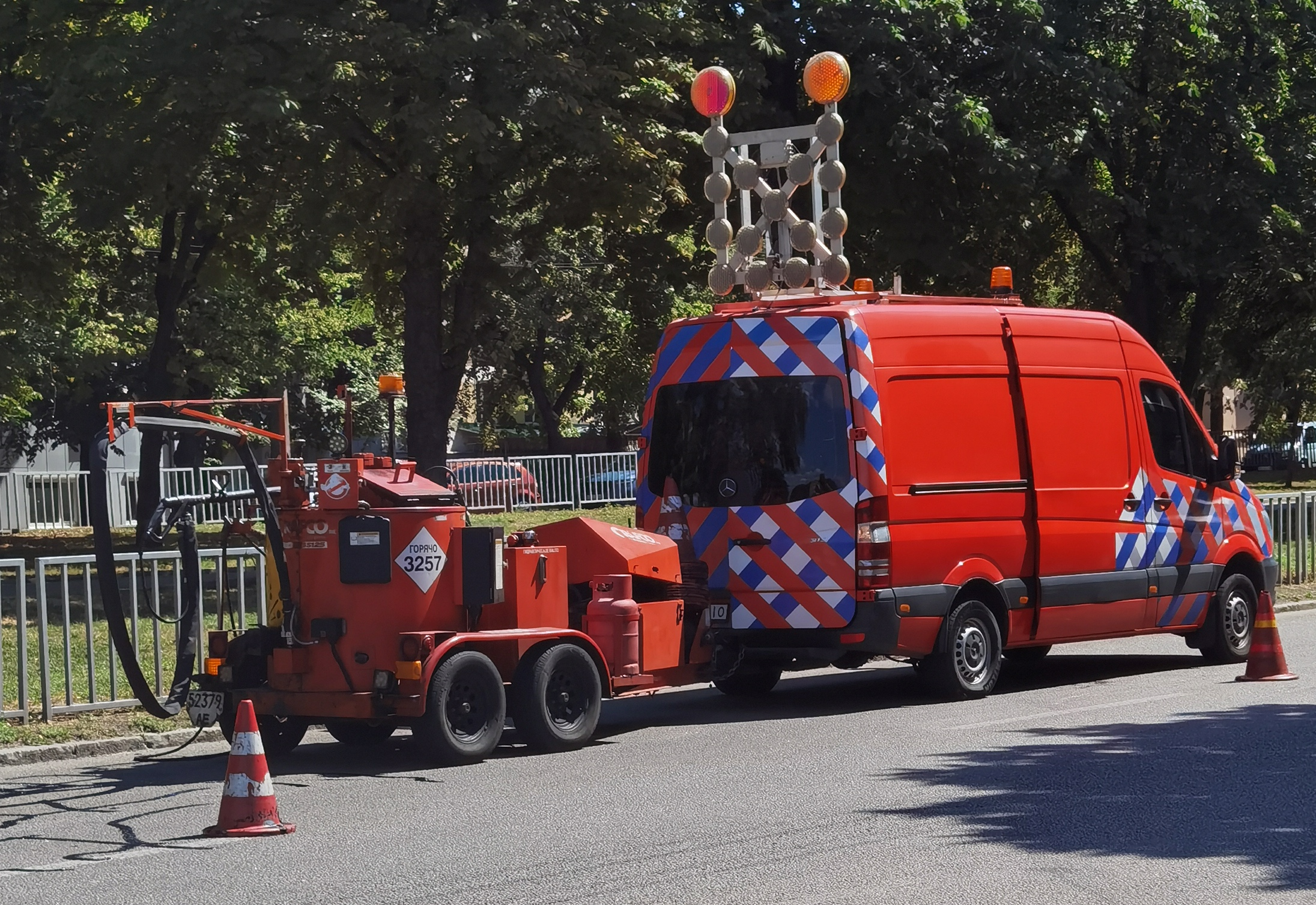
Crack sealing machine in Dnipro, Ukraine.

In addition to repair costs, the condition of a road surface has economic effects for road users. Rolling resistance increases on rough pavement, as does wear and tear of vehicle components. It has been estimated that poor road surfaces cost the average US driver $324 per year in vehicle repairs, or a total of $67 billion. Also, it has been estimated that small improvements in road surface conditions can decrease fuel consumption between 1.8 and 4.7%.

== Markings ==
Road surface markings are used on paved roadways to provide guidance and information to drivers and pedestrians. It can be in the form of mechanical markers such as cat's eyes, botts' dots and rumble strips, or non-mechanical markers such as paints, thermoplastic, plastic and epoxy.

== See also ==
- Asphalt
- Cobblestone
- Diamond grinding of pavement
- Ecogrid
- Good Roads Movement
- List of road types by features
- Pavement management
- Plastic armour
- Portuguese pavement (mosaic-like)
- Road construction
- Road slipperiness
- Sealcoat
- Sett (paving)
