= Concrete pavement restoration =

Techniques for repair of concrete pavement surfaces

Concrete pavement restoration (CPR) together with concrete pavement preservation (CPP) is a group of various techniques used to maintain concrete roadways.

== Techniques ==
CPP and CPR techniques include slab stabilization, full- and partial-depth repair, dowel bar retrofit, cross stitching longitudinal cracks or joints, diamond grinding and joint and crack resealing. CPP and CPR methods, developed over the last 40 years, are used in lieu of asphalt overlays and bituminous patches to repair roads when longer lasting solutions are desired. When installing pavers over top of an existing asphalt of concrete pad, there are three installation options: sand set, bituminous set, and mortar set. Due to rising oil prices, these methods are often less expensive than an asphalt overlay and last three times longer in addition to providing a greener, more sustainable solution.

A recent study was conducted that shows that diamond grinding is an effective means of extending the service life of concrete by imparting a smooth pavement surface with desirable surface texture. The process can also be used to address faulting at joints or cracks, roughness, polished concrete surfaces exhibiting inadequate macrotexture, wheel path rutting, unacceptable noise levels, permanent upward slab warping and inadequate transverse slopes. The California Department of Transportation (Caltrans), a pioneer in the use of diamond grinding to preserve their concrete roadways, has determined that the average age of a diamond ground surface in California is between 16 and 17 years, and a pavement can be diamond ground up to three times.

Dowel bar retrofit (DBR) is a process that re-establishes load transfer capability on joints and cracks by installing epoxy-coated, round steel dowels into existing concrete pavement across transverse joints and/or cracks. Slots are cut using diamond-tipped saw blades; the existing concrete is removed and the dowels are placed in the slots across the joints or cracks. The slots are then backfilled with a non-shrink grout and the pavement is diamond ground to restore smoothness. The diamond grinding removes excess grout and any displacement of panels. The entire road is often diamond ground to remove bumps or dips and provide a safe, quiet riding surface. In Wisconsin, researchers found that the overall accident rate for diamond ground surfaces was only 60 percent of the rate for the non-ground surfaces.

== See also ==
- International Grooving & Grinding Association
- Sealcoat
