= Diamond grinding =

Technique of grinding

Diamond grinding is a grinding process that can be applied to a variety of surfaces including floors, stones, and engineering ceramics. It takes advantage of the fact that diamond has the highest hardness of any bulk material, and uses diamond tools to smooth out bumps and other irregularities on the surface.

== See also ==
- Diamond grinding of pavement
- Diamond grinding cup wheel
