= Diamond grinding of pavement =

Technique for correcting surface defects

Diamond grinding is a pavement preservation technique that corrects a variety of surface imperfections on both concrete and asphalt concrete pavements. Most often utilized on concrete pavement, diamond grinding is typically performed in conjunction with other concrete pavement preservation (CPP) techniques such as road slab stabilization, full- and partial-depth repair, dowel bar retrofit, cross stitching longitudinal cracks or joint and crack resealing. Diamond grinding restores rideability by removing surface irregularities caused during construction or through repeated traffic loading over time. The immediate effect of diamond grinding is a significant improvement in the smoothness of a pavement. Another important effect of diamond grinding is the considerable increase in surface macrotexture and consequent improvement in skid resistance, noise reduction and safety.

== History ==
The industry can be traced back to an event where a single diamond blade mounted on a concrete saw was used to groove concrete pavement in the late 1940s. Since that early tentative step, concrete grinding, grooving and texturing with diamond blades has developed into what is today a multimillion-dollar industry that is practiced worldwide.

One of the first uses of diamond grinding of highway pavement was in 1965 on a 19-year-old section of Interstate 10 in California to eliminate excessive faulting. The pavement was ground again in 1984 and in 1997, and it is still carrying heavy traffic as of 2006, more than 60 years after it was first constructed.

== Process ==
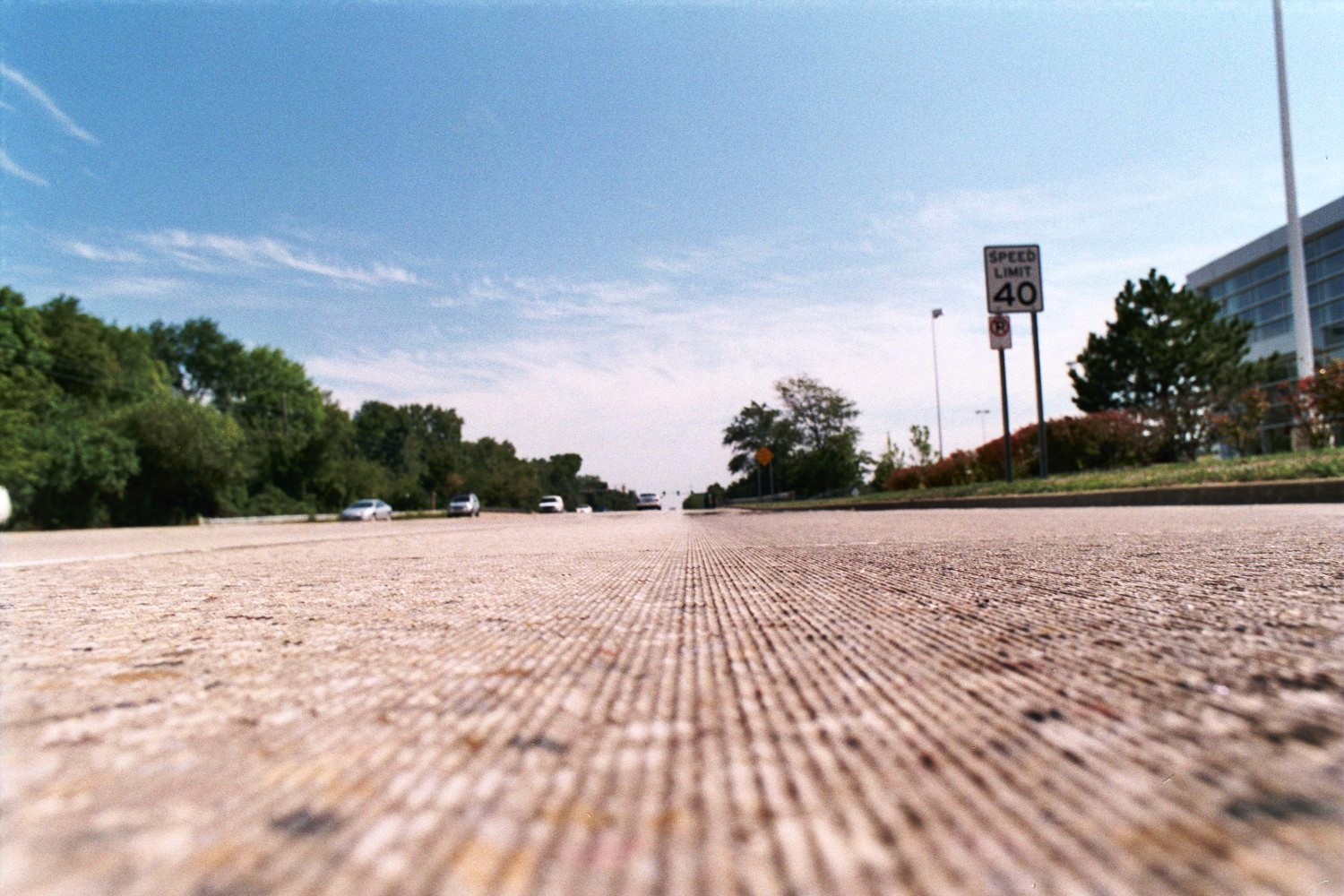
Results of diamond grinding of pavement

Diamond grinding involves removing a thin layer at the surface of hardened PCC using closely spaced diamond saw blades. The level surface is achieved by running the blade assembly at a predetermined level across the pavement surface, which produces saw cut grooves. The uncut concrete between each saw cut breaks off more or less at a constant level above the saw cut grooves, leaving a level surface (at a macroscopic level) with longitudinal texture. The result is a pavement that is smooth, safe, quiet and pleasing to travel on.

The diamond blades are composed of industrial diamonds and metallurgical powder. When grinding materials containing hard aggregate materials, a diamond blade with a soft bond is needed, which means that the metallurgical powders in the cutting segments of the blade wear fast enough to expose the diamond cutting media at the proper rate for efficient cutting. Conversely, to cut soft aggregates, a diamond blade with a hard bond is recommended.

Diamond grinding should not be confused with milling or scarifying. Milling is an impact process that chips small pieces of concrete from the pavement surface. Diamond grinding is a cutting process.

== Applications ==
There are many surface issues that diamond grinding can improve or correct. Some of the surface imperfections that can be addressed by diamond grinding include: faulting at joints and cracks, built-in or construction roughness, polished concrete surfaces exhibiting inadequate macrotexture, wheel path rutting caused by studded tires, unacceptable noise level, slab warping caused by moisture gradient and construction curling, inadequate transverse slope and splash and spray reduction.

== Cost-effectiveness ==
Diamond grinding is a cost-effective treatment, whether used alone or as part of an overall concrete pavement restoration (CPR) program. In most cases, the cost of diamond grinding is only about half the cost of bituminous overlays. This cost competitiveness, in conjunction with eliminating bituminous overlay problems (rutting, corrugation, poor skid resistance, drainage reduction, vertical clearance reduction) makes diamond grinding an alternative for many rehabilitation projects. Diamond grinding can be used as part of any preventive maintenance program for concrete pavements.

Caltrans reports that the average life of a diamond-ground surface is between 16 and 17 years. On average, more than 2,000 lane-miles of concrete pavement are diamond ground every year.

== Benefits ==
As trucks travel across bumps and dips, they bounce vertically on their suspension resulting in dynamic loading on the roadway. The increased load due to dynamic impact results in higher stresses in the pavement materials and consequently lower road life. By providing an extremely smooth surface, diamond grinding limits dynamic loading.

A potential benefit of diamond grinding may be reduced road noise, depending on the grinding technique used and the surface texture that is left. A longitudinal texture can provide a quieter surface than many transverse textures. A multi-state study on noise and texture on PCC pavements concluded that longitudinal texture concrete pavements are among the quietest pavements for interior and exterior noise. Diamond grinding can also remove faults by leveling the pavement surface, thus eliminating the thumping and slapping sound created by faulted joints.

Enhanced surface texture and skid resistance is another benefit of diamond grinding. The corrugated surface increases surface macrotexture and provides channels for water to displace beneath vehicle tires, reducing hydroplaning potential. Diamond grinding also improves cornering friction, providing directional stability by tire tread-pavement groove interlock.

Diamond grinding has been found to reduce accident rates in some scenarios. The increased macrotexture provides for improved drainage of water at the tire-pavement interface, thus improving wet-weather friction, particularly for vehicles with balding tires. The longitudinal nature of a diamond-ground texture also provides directional stability and reduces hydroplaning, thus contributing to the safety of diamond ground surfaces.

Diamond grinding should be applied to the portion of the pavement where restoration is needed. A highway agency can require grinding only on the truck lanes of a four-lane divided highway, presenting a significant cost advantage.

== See also ==
- Diamond grinding – Technique of grinding
- Diamond blade – Saw blade enhanced with diamond grit
- Diamond segment
- Diamond tool – Cutting tool with diamond grains
- Concrete grinder – Machine for polishing or grinding hardened concrete
- Dowel bar retrofit – Highway crack treatment
