= Pavement milling =

Process in construction of removing at least part of the surface of a paved area

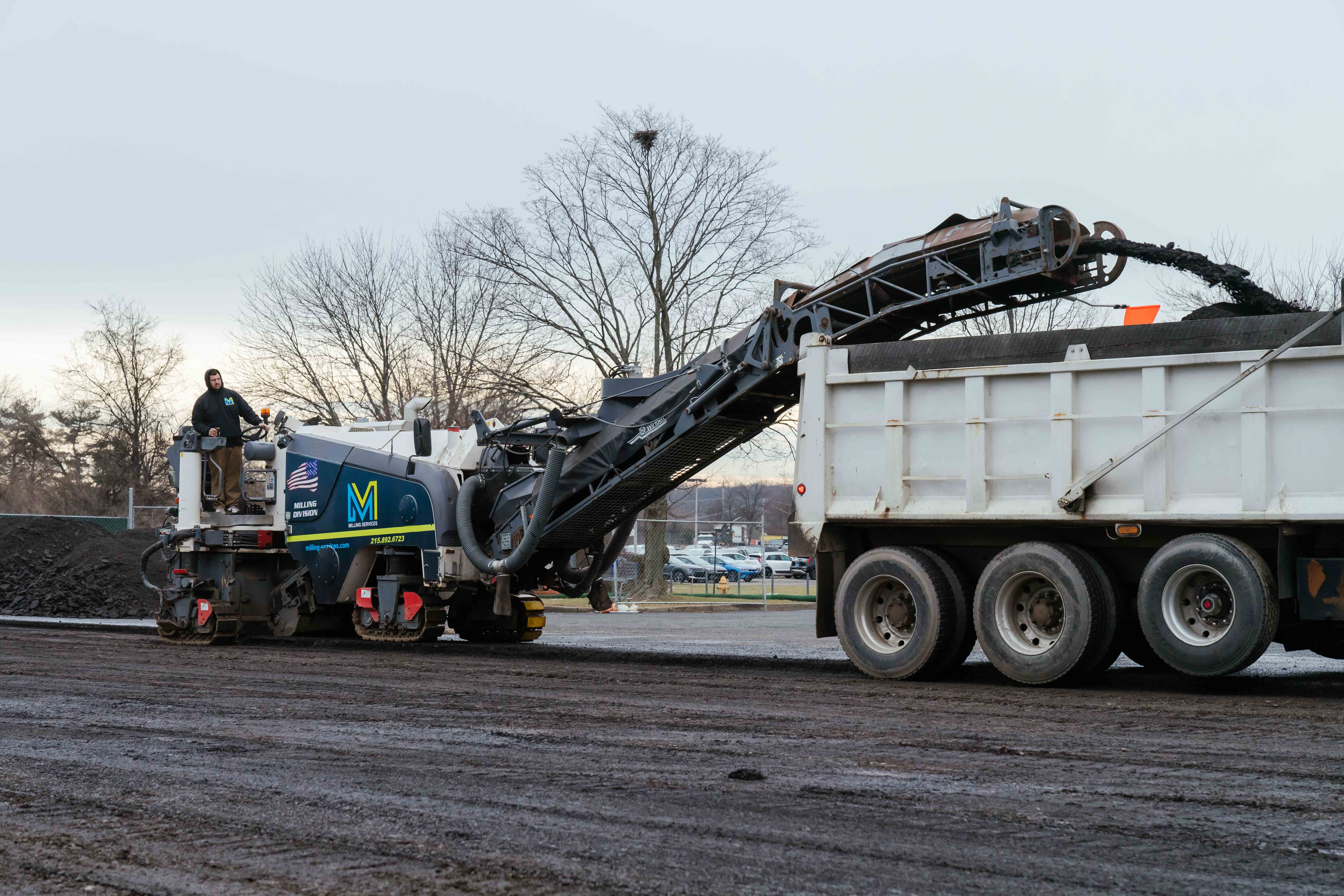
Asphalt paving being milled in preparation for repaving

Pavement milling (cold planing, asphalt milling, or profiling) is the process of removing at least part of the surface of a paved area such as a road, bridge, or parking lot. Milling removes anywhere from just enough thickness to level and smooth the surface to a full depth removal. There are a number of different reasons for milling a paved area instead of simply repaving over the existing surface.

== Purpose ==
Recycling of the road surface is one of the main reasons for milling a road surface. Milling is widely used for pavement recycling today, where the pavement is removed and ground up to be used as the aggregate in new pavement. For asphalt surfaces the product of milling is reclaimed asphalt pavement (RAP), which can be recycled in the asphalt hot mix asphalt (pavement) by combining with new aggregate and asphalt cement (binder) or a recycling agent. This reduces the impact that resurfacing has on the environment.

Milling can also remove distresses from the surface, providing a better driving experience and/or longer roadway life. Some of the issues that milling can remove include:

- Raveling: aggregate separating from the binder and becoming loose on the road
- Bleeding: the binder (asphalt) coming up to the surface of the road
- Rutting: formation of low spots in pavement along the direction of travel usually in the wheel path
- Shoving: a washboard like effect transverse to the direction of travel
- Ride quality: uneven road surface such as swells, bumps, sags, or depressions
- Damage: resulting from accidents and/or fires

It can also be used to control or change the height of part or all of the road. This can be done to control heights and clearances of other road structures such as: curb reveals, manhole and catch basin heights, shoulder and guardrail heights, and overhead clearances. It can also be done to change the slope or camber of the road or for grade adjustments which can help with drainage.

=== Specialty ===
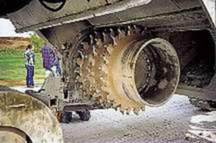
Modified roto-mill head for dowel bar retrofit

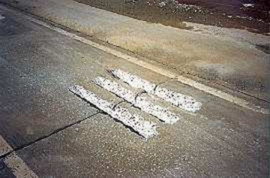
Dowel bar retrofit slots after the milling

Specialty milling can be used to form rumble strips which are often used along highways. Using milling instead of other methods, such as rolling them in, means that the rumble strips can be added at any time after the road surface has hardened.

Another example is to modify the roto-milling head to create slots in concrete slabs for the dowel bar retrofit process. The typical process is to saw cut and jackhammer out the slots for the dowels. Following dowel placement, the slots are then typically backfilled with a non-shrink concrete mixture, and the pavement is diamond-ground to restore smoothness. This special milling process shortens the time to create slots from the traditional method which is labor-intensive.

== Types ==
In the USA, the Asphalt Recycling and Reclaiming Association has defined five classes of cold planing that the Federal Highway Administration has recognized. The classes are:

- Class I – milling to remove surface irregularities
- Class II – milling to uniform depth as shown on plans and specifications
- Class III – same as class II with the addition of cross slope
- Class IV – milling to the base or subgrade (full depth)
- Class V – milling to different depths at different locations

== Process and machinery ==
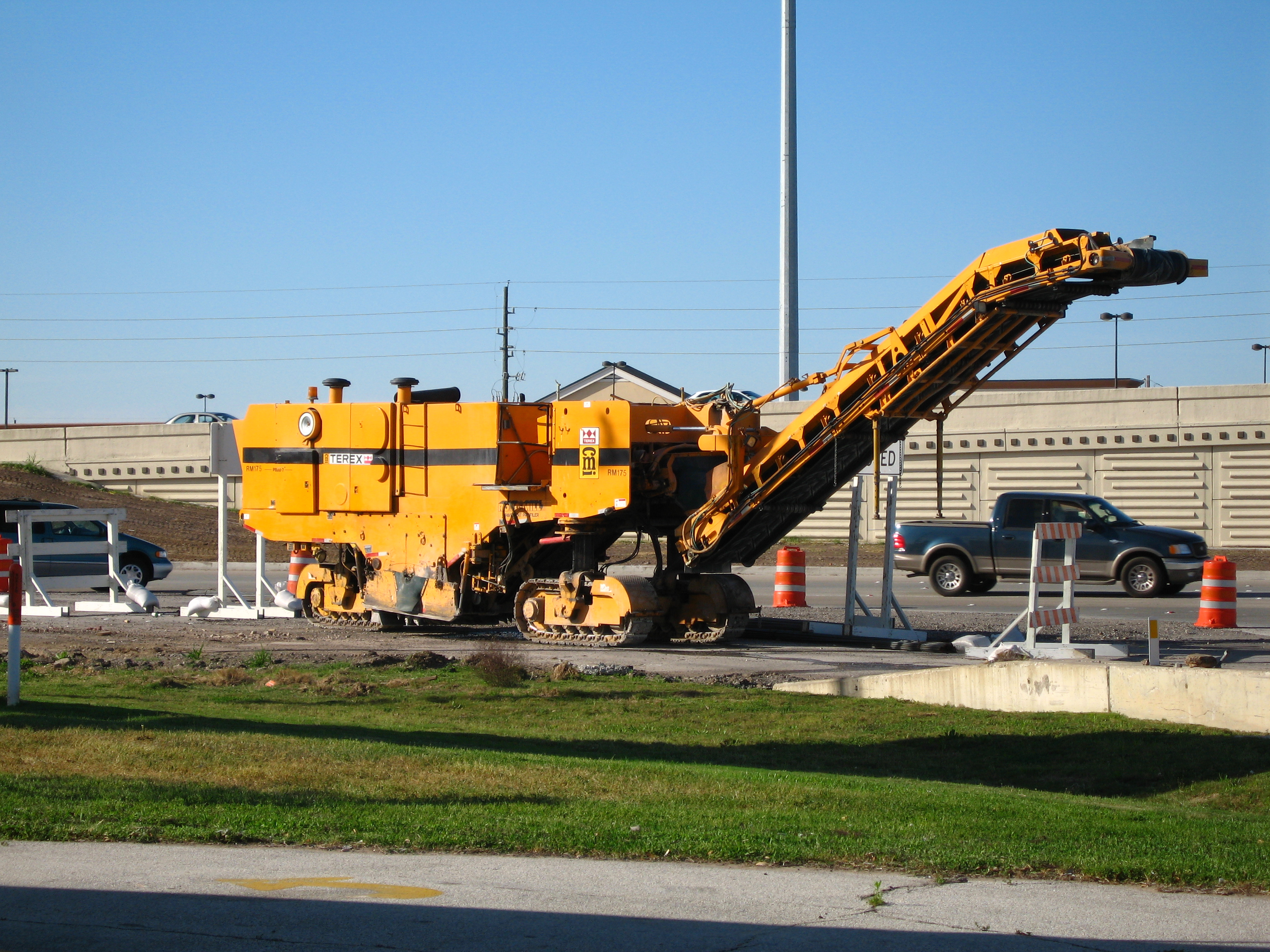
Asphalt Milling Machine

Asphalt milling is performed by construction equipment named cold planers or commonly referred to as milling machines. These machines use a large rotating drum to remove and grind the road surface. The drum consists of scrolls of tool holders. The scrolls are positioned around the drum such that the ground pavement is moved toward the center and can be loaded onto the machine's conveyor belt. The tool holders can wear out over time and can be broken if highway structures like manholes are encountered while milling.

The tool holders on the drum hold carbide cutters. The cutters can be removed and replaced as they wear out. The amount of wear (and therefore the interval between replacement) varies with the type and consistency of the material being milled; intervals can range from a few hours to several days.

The drum is enclosed in a housing/scrapper that is used to contain the milled material to be collected and deposited on the conveyor. The spacing of the tool spirals around the drum affect the end surface of the road, with micro-milling having the tightest spacing.

The majority of milling machines use an up-cut setup which means that the drum rotates in the direction opposite that of the drive wheel or tracks, (i.e. work surface feeds into the cut). The speed of the rotating drum should be slower than the forward speed of the machine for a suitable finished surface.

Modern machines generally use a front-loading conveyor system that have the advantage of picking up any material that falls off the conveyor as milling progresses. Water is generally applied to the drum as it spins, because of the heat generated during the milling process. Additionally, water helps control the dust created. In order to control the depth, slopes, and profile of the final milled surface many millers now have automatic depth control using lasers, string-lines, or other methods to maintain milled surfaces to ±5 mm (0.20 in) of the target height.

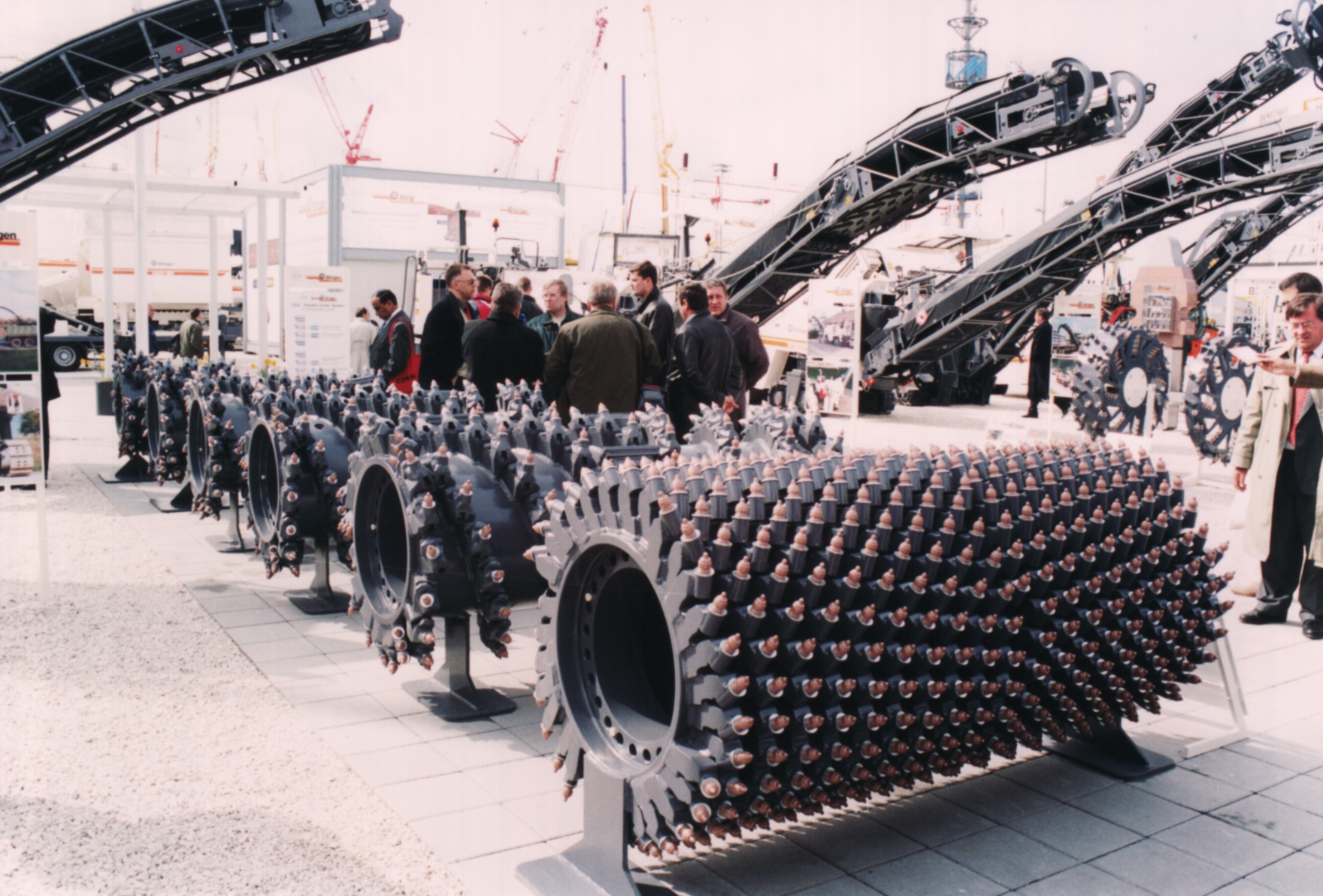
Pavement milling drums

== Micro milling ==
Micro milling is also known as carbide grinding. It is a lower cost alternative to diamond grinding of pavement. Micro milling uses a specialty drum with three to four times as many cutting teeth than a standard milling drum. Micro milling can be used either as the final surface or as a treatment before applying a thin overlay. Micro milling can be used to remove many of the same distresses that standard milling can remove, although usually to a shallower depth. A micro milled surface has a uniform finish with reduced road noise compared to standard milling.
