= Sealcoat =

Protective coating for asphalt surfaces

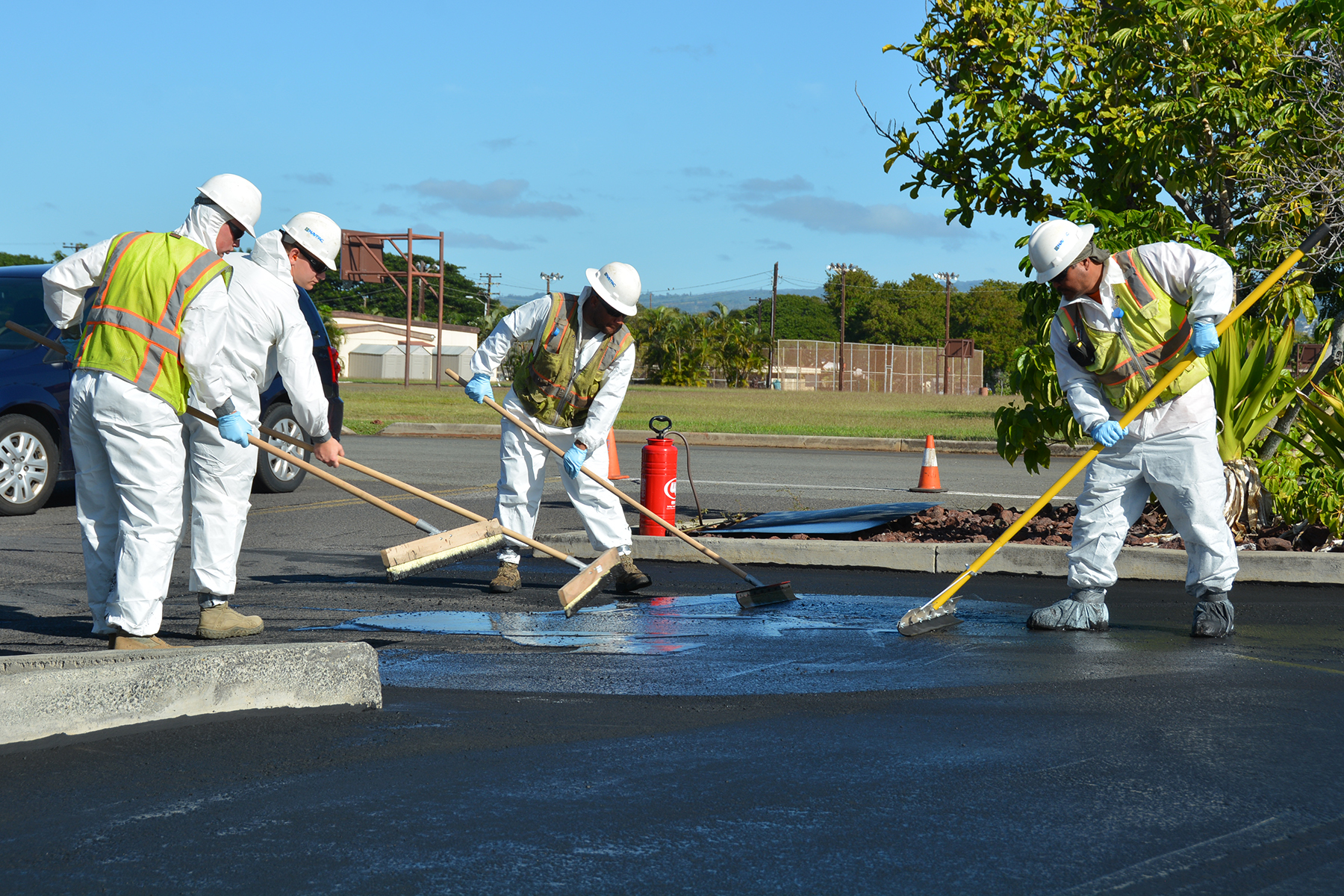
Sealcoating in Hawaii, 2017

Sealcoating, or pavement sealing, is the process of applying a protective coating to asphalt-based pavements to provide a layer of protection from the elements: water, oils, and U.V. damage.

The effects of asphalt sealers have been debated. Asphalt sealing is marketed as increasing the life of the asphalt, but there is no independent research that proves these claims. Asphalt sealing can also make the asphalt more slippery and impact the environment.

There are concerns about pavement sealer polluting the environment after it is abraded from the surface of the pavement. Some states in North America have banned the use of coal tar–based sealants primarily based on United States Geological Survey studies.

== Types ==
There are primarily five types of pavement sealers.

These are commonly known as:

1. Refined tar-based (coal tar based)
2. Asphalt-based
3. Acrylic (Paint)
4. Fast Dry
5. Oil-based

All five have their advantages and disadvantages, but are typically chosen by the preference unless otherwise specified.

== Application methods ==
Prior to application the surface must be completely clean and dry using sweeping methods and/or blowers. If the surface is not clean and dry, then poor adhesion will result. Pavement sealers are applied with either pressurized spray equipment, or self-propelled squeegee machines or by hand with a brush. Equipment must have continuous agitation to maintain consistency of the sealcoat mix. The process is typically a two-coat application which requires 24 to 48 hours of curing before vehicles can be allowed back on the surface. Once the surface is properly prepared, then properly mixed sealer will be applied at about 1.5 square meters per liter (60 sq ft per U.S. gal; 72 sq ft per Imp gal) per coat.

== Polycyclic aromatic hydrocarbons ==
Coal tar is made up primarily of polycyclic aromatic hydrocarbons. Some studies suggest that refined coal tar sealants are a significant contributor to PAH levels in streams and creek beds and that the continual application of sealcoats may be a significant factor. As a result, more than 100 units of government in the United States have banned this material. The same studies also suggest that it can be harmful if ingested before curing and ingesting soil or dust contaminated by eroded coal tar sealant. It is also known to have effects on fish and other aquatic species. From 2025, Canada has also banned sealants that contain coal tar as well as those that contain PAHs that exceed 1,000 ppm.

== See also ==
- Road surface
