= Ecogrid =

Type of plastic

Ecogrid, known as Ecoraster to most of Europe, is a type of plastic, permeable paving grid used in the construction of parking lots, walkways and other outdoor surfaces.

Ecogrid is marketed as a green technology because it is designed to reduce harmful stormwater runoff and is made with post-consumer plastic to reduce waste. Ecoraster was trade marked by Purus Plastics in 2008.

Ecogrid is made from specially selected plastics that are recycled in their Bavarian production centre. It has a locking mechanism that secures one grid to the next. There are many fill types for this kind of grid system but mainly they are:

- Grass
- Gravel
- Resin bound stone
- Resin bound rubber crumb
- Soil
