= Dowel bar retrofit =

Highway crack treatment

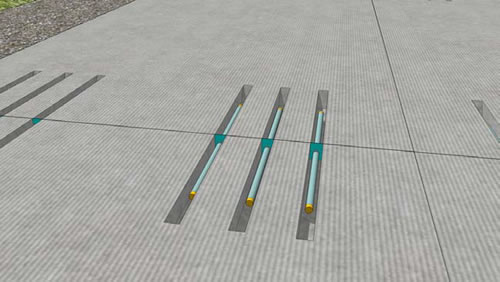
Illustration of dowel bar retrofitting used for pavement preservation

A dowel bar retrofit (DBR) is a method of reinforcing cracks in highway pavement by inserting steel dowel bars in slots cut across the cracks. It is a technique which several U.S. states' departments of transportation have successfully used in repairs to address faulting in older jointed plain concrete pavements. The typical approach is to saw cut and jackhammer out the slots for the dowels. Following dowel placement the slots are then typically backfilled with a non-shrink concrete mixture, and the pavement is diamond-ground to restore smoothness.

== History ==
As a vehicle travels on jointed concrete roads the weight of the vehicle passes from one concrete panel to the next. As the vehicle traverses the joints its weight is placed on the edge of the panel, where the panel is least able to withstand the deflection force. This can cause cracks as pavement shears off the edge of the panel. On older highways built in the early-to-mid 20th century, dowel bars (steel rods) were placed across the joints to help transfer the load from one panel to the next.

This was discontinued because the dowel bars tended to corrode and required frequent replacement. Stainless steel dowel bars are more resistant to corrosion, but stainless steel is relatively expensive compared to other materials. Instead, for several decades, the cohesion between the panels and the strength of the roadbed was relied upon to collectively distribute the load from one panel to the next, a concept known as aggregate interlock. Over time the joints and roadbed tended to break down under stress, resulting in cracks and displacement of the panels. Most highways in the United States built as part of the Interstate Highway System from the 1950s to the 1980s relied solely upon aggregate interlock and began to show problems in the 1970s and 1980s.

In contemporary highway construction since the mid-1990s, dowel bars are once again placed across joints and at intervals along the pavement. Today, dowel bars are coated with epoxy to prevent the corrosion problems seen in earlier installations.

== Overview ==
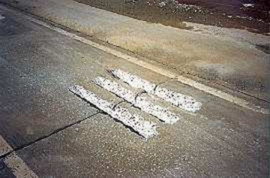
Slots for the dowel bar retrofit are milled into existing concrete with the modified roto mill head

Many states are retrofitting older highways with epoxy-coated dowel bars. The retrofit begins with cutting of six slots (three in each wheel path) across all transverse joints or cracks. The slots are cut with ganged diamond saws that make six cuts in each wheel path. The concrete between the saw cuts is then removed with lightweight jackhammers (heavy-weight jackhammers tend to damage the concrete around the cuts). The epoxy-coated dowel bars are placed in the slots, then the slots are filled with grout and the joints or cracks are filled with waterproof caulk. The final step is to diamond-grind the joint to remove both excess grout and any displacement of the panels.

The final step often involves diamond-grinding of the entire road surface to remove any bumps or dips. Without the dowel bar retrofit this grinding would have to be repeated every six to eight years, but it is predicted that the retrofit will greatly increase this interval. Dowel Bar Retrofit has been proven to outlast Asphalt Overlay by at least ten years, and significantly improves ride quality.

== Process ==
For dowel bar retrofit, dowels, bond breaker, expansion caps, dowel bar support chairs, foam core insert, caulking filler, non-shrink concrete backfill material and submittals are needed. The dowels need to be smooth, round, epoxy and made of bond breaker coated steel conforming to requirements. The bond breaker is to be applied on all surfaces of the dowel bar. The expansion caps belong at each end of the dowel bar and the dowel bar support chairs are used to firmly hold the dowels centered in the slots during backfill operations. The foam core insert is used to re-establish the joint or crack, which allows the bar within each side of the slot to expand and contract. The caulking filler is used to prevent backfill material from flowing into the joint or crack. Non-shrink concrete backfill material that is tested as rapid set concrete patching materials is recommended for use on DBR projects.

First, make two saw cuts in the pavement to outline the longitudinal sides of each dowel bar slot. Saw to a depth and length that allows the center of the dowel to be placed at mid-depth in the pavement slab. Saw slots parallel to each other and to the center line of the roadway with a maximum tolerance of 1/4-inch per 12 inches of dowel bar length. Employ saws equipped with gang-mounted diamond blades capable of cutting three or four slots simultaneously in each wheel path. Skewed joints or cracks may require slots longer than the length specified in the plans. Remove water and paste residue from the pavement surface immediately by means of a vacuum attachment on the sawing machine. For smaller projects, a slot sawing machine might not be feasible. Consider allowing the use of walk-behind saws for slot cutting when the project contains fewer than 100 retrofit bars.

Remove existing concrete from the slots followed by the cleaning out of all debris. Use maximum weight 30 pound jackhammers to remove the concrete remaining between the saw cuts. If the concrete removal operations cause damage to the pavement that is to remain, discontinue concrete removal operations and only resume after taking corrective measures. During concrete removal operations, use a small bush hammer as necessary to produce a flat, level surface within the slot so the backfill flows and consolidates under the dowel bars.

Complete installation of retrofit dowels, with dowel bars and backfill placed prior to reopening the lane to public traffic. Place silicone at all joints and cracks followed by the dowel bar assemblies in each slot. Following that, place patching material and then consolidate and finish patching material. Finally, diamond-grind the pavement surface within 30 working days of dowel bar retrofit placement.

== Problems ==
Dowel bar retrofits, if done badly, can cause serious problems. These problems are usually due to poor workmanship and can be avoided by careful following of specifications and close supervision of workers. Use of heavy jackhammers (heavier than 14 kg class) tends to cause cracking of the concrete all around the slots. Lack of caulk or voids in the caulk put in the joints or cracks leads to cracks around the joints. Voids in the grout (especially below the dowel bar) can cause failure of the grout.

== Confusion with road surface markings ==
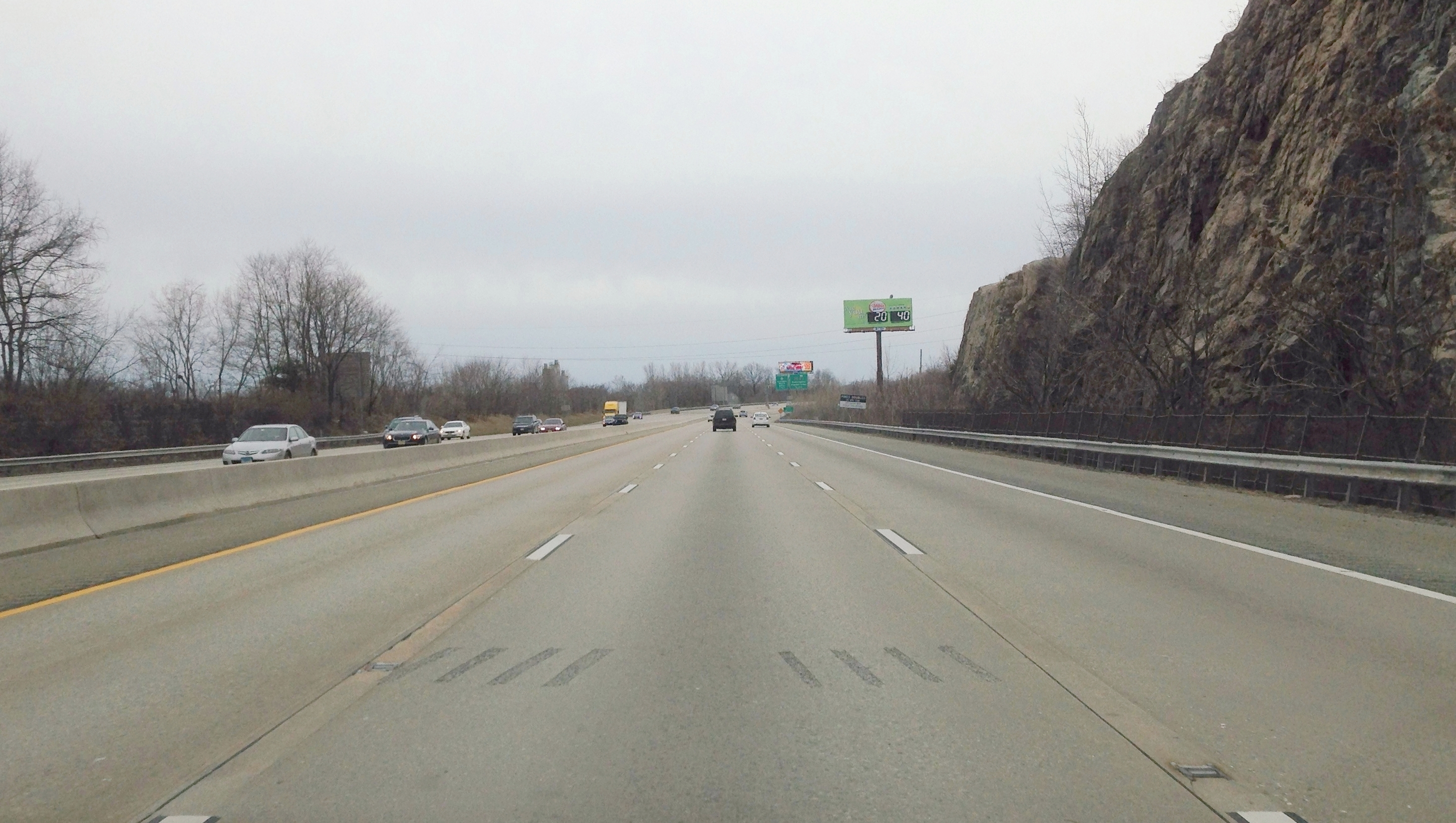
Typical marks of the completed dowel bar retrofit

The completion of the dowel bar retrofit process usually leaves marks on the concrete pavements which consist of short parallel lines in two groups, left and right, 18 inches (46 cm) inward the traveling lane from the lane markings. Each group has 3 or 4 slots that are parallel to the traffic flows. Each rectangular slot has the width of about 2.5 inches (6.4 cm) and the length of about 2 feet (61 cm) or more. The backfilled slots may sometime give an impression that the highway pavements have been milled into grooves especially after the wear of patching material caused by studded tires.

The visible marks may appear to be a symmetrical pattern of dash marks on the roadway, as if there were an associated meaning to the pattern. When there are many of them along the roadway, motorists on the interstate highways may interpret the grind marks as an unknown form of mechanical markers, such as ground-in strips, or strange road surface markings. In some cases, these marks are confusing for motorists. When roads are under construction and lanes are laterally shifted, such marks may interfere with temporary lane markings. As the marks from the dowel bar retrofit are not intended to be any form of road surface markings, the responsible agencies try to make these marks smooth and hope to make them less visible to the motorists.

== See also ==
- Concrete grinder
