= Road =

Land route

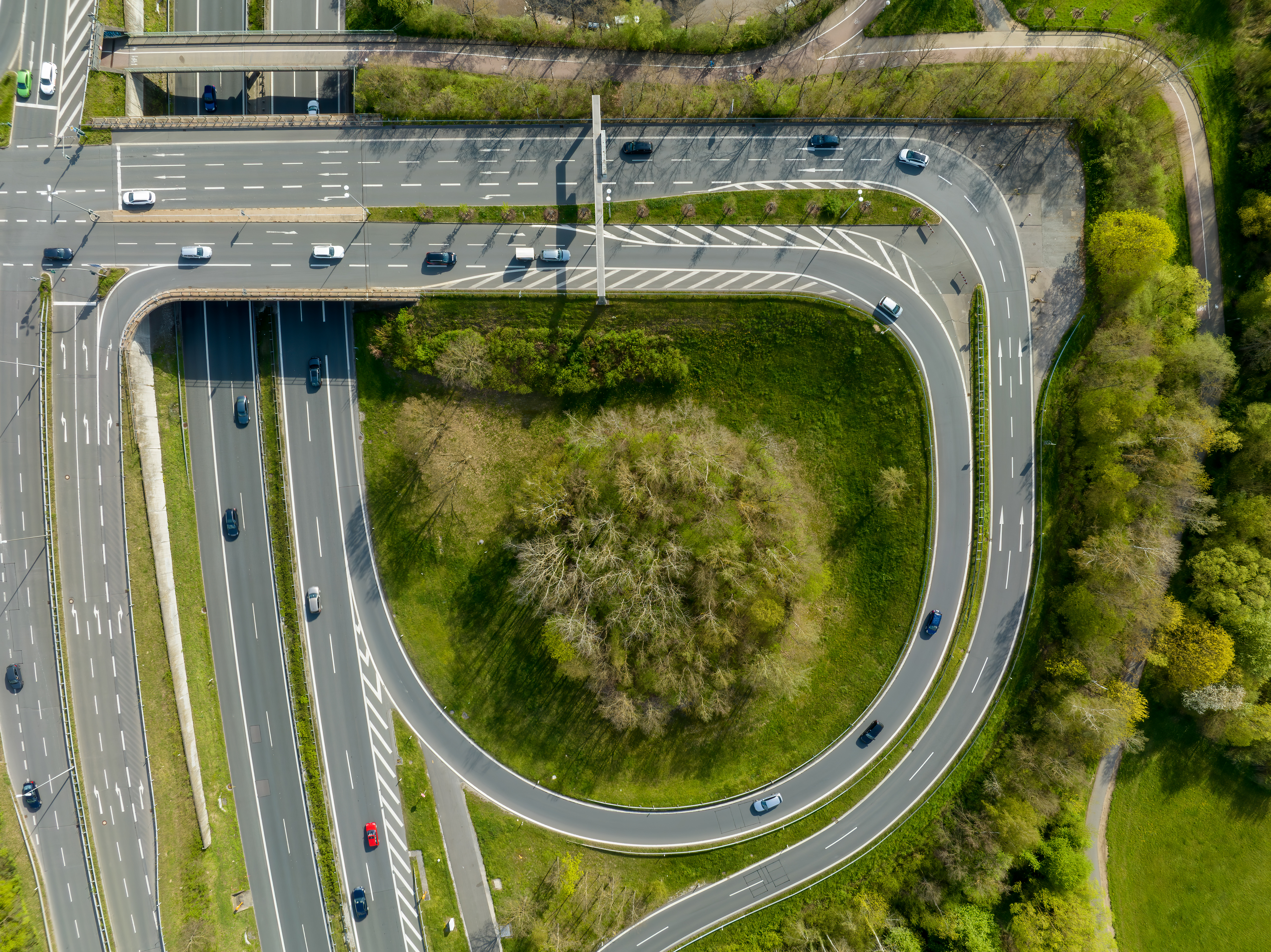
Bundesautobahn 73 and its slip road leading to Erlangen, in Germany

A road is a thoroughfare from one place to another, primarily used for movement of traffic. Many roads are paved.

The words "road" and "street" are commonly considered to be interchangeable, but the distinction is important in urban design. Roads differ from streets, whose primary use is local access. Roads also differ from stroads, which combine the features of streets and roads.

There are many types of roads, including parkways, avenues, controlled-access highways (freeways, motorways, and expressways), tollways, highways, local roads, public roads and private roads.

The primary features of roads include lanes, sidewalks (pavement), roadways (carriageways), medians, shoulders, verges, bike paths (cycle paths), and shared-use paths.

== Definitions ==
Historically, many roads were simply recognizable routes without any formal construction or some maintenance.

The Organization for Economic Co-operation and Development (OECD) defines a road as "a line of communication (travelled way) using a stabilized base other than rails or air strips open to public traffic, primarily for the use of road motor vehicles running on their own wheels", which includes "bridges, tunnels, supporting structures, junctions, crossings, interchanges, and toll roads, but not cycle paths".

The Eurostat, ITF and UNECE Glossary for Transport Statistics Illustrated defines a road as a "Line of communication (traveled way) open to public traffic, primarily for the use of road motor vehicles, using a stabilized base other than rails or air strips. [...] Included are paved roads and other roads with a stabilized base, e.g. gravel roads. Roads also cover streets, bridges, tunnels, supporting structures, junctions, crossings and interchanges. Toll roads are also included. Excluded are dedicated cycle lanes."

The 1968 Vienna Convention on Road Traffic defines a road as the entire surface of any way or street open to public traffic.

In urban areas roads may diverge through a city or village and be named as streets, serving a dual function as urban space easement and route. Modern roads are normally smoothed, paved, or otherwise prepared to allow easy travel.

=== Australia ===
Part 2, Division 1, clauses 11–13 of the National Transport Commission Regulations 2006 defines a road in Australia as 'an area that is open to or used by the public and is developed for, or has as one of its main uses, the driving or riding of motor vehicles.'

Further, it defines a shoulder (typical an area of the road outside the edge line, or the curb) and a road-related area which includes green areas separating roads, areas designated for cyclists and areas generally accessible to the public for driving, riding or parking vehicles.

=== New Zealand ===
In New Zealand, the definition of a road is broad in common law where the statutory definition includes areas the public has access to, by right or not. Beaches, publicly accessible car parks and yards (even if privately owned), river beds, road shoulders (verges), wharves and bridges are included. However, the definition of a road for insurance purposes may be restricted to reduce risk.

=== United Kingdom ===
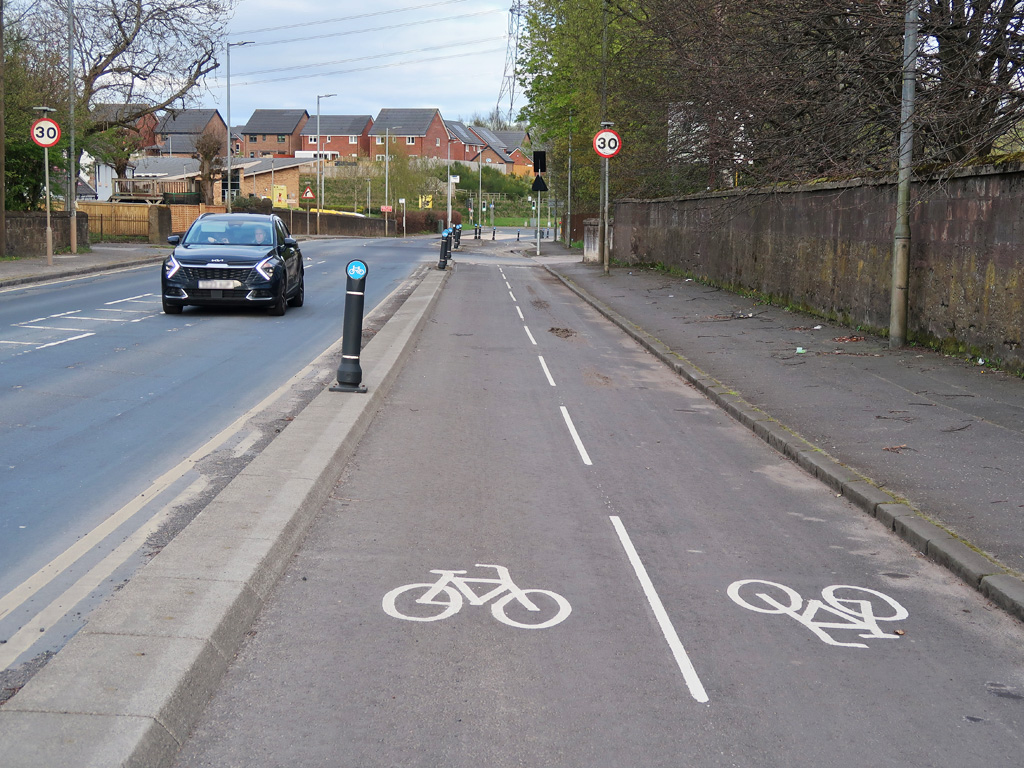
Pavements and cycle lanes form part of the road.

In the United Kingdom The Highway Code details rules for "road users", but there is some ambiguity between the terms highway and road. For the purposes of the English law, Highways Act 1980, which covers England and Wales but not Scotland or Northern Ireland, road is "any length of highway or of any other road to which the public has access, and includes bridges over which a road passes". This includes footpaths, bridleways and cycle tracks, and also road and driveways on private land and many car parks. Vehicle Excise Duty, a road use tax, is payable on some vehicles used on the public road.

The definition of a road depends on the definition of a highway; there is no formal definition for a highway in the relevant Act. A 1984 ruling said "the land over which a public right of way exists is known as a highway; and although most highways have been made up into roads, and most easements of way exist over footpaths, the presence or absence of a made road has nothing to do with the distinction. Another legal view is that while a highway historically included footpaths, bridleways, driftways, etc., it can now be used to mean those ways that allow the movement of motor vehicles, and the term rights of way can be used to cover the wider usage.

=== United States ===
In the United States, laws distinguish between public roads, which are open to public use, and private roads, which are privately controlled.

== History ==
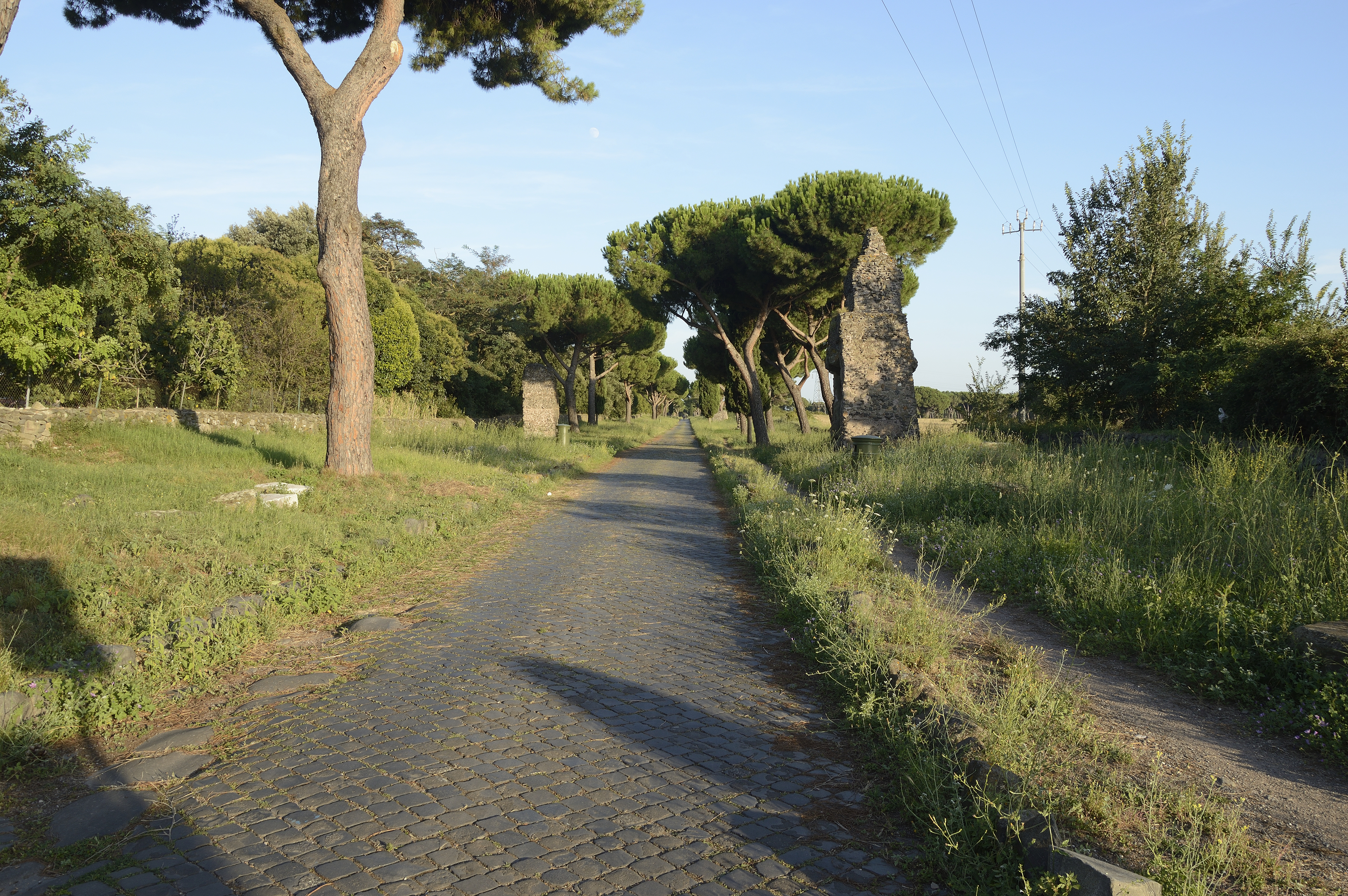
The Appian Way, an important Roman road

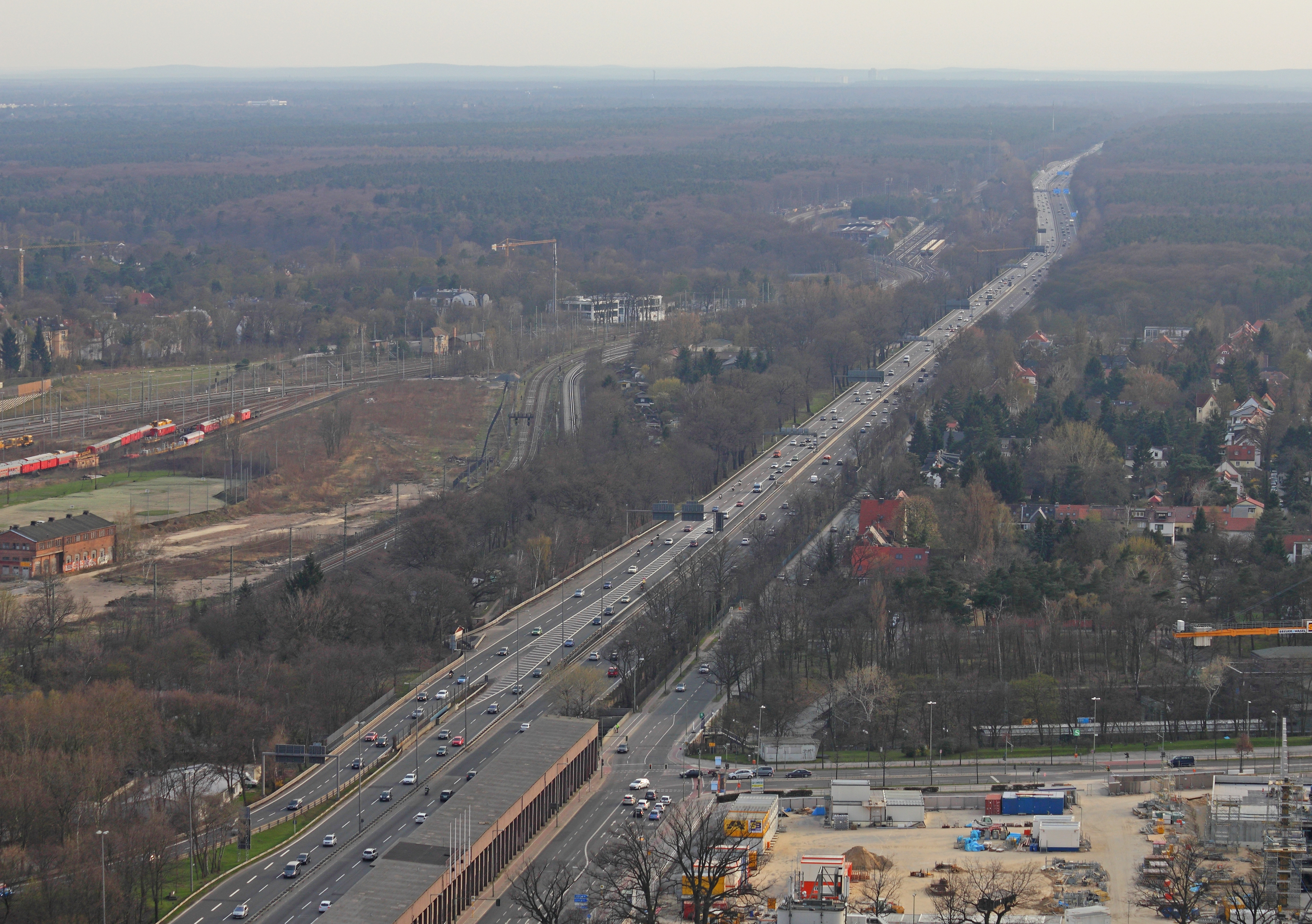
Part of the AVUS road in Berlin, the first automobile-only road.

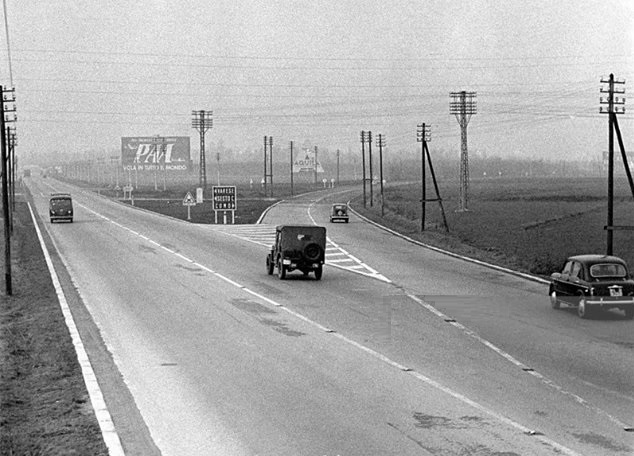
The Italian Autostrada dei Laghi ("Lakes Highway" in the 1950s; now parts of the Autostrada A8 and the Autostrada A9), the first controlled-access highway ever built in the world

The assertion that the first pathways were the trails made by animals has not been universally accepted; in many cases animals do not follow constant paths. Some believe that some roads originated from following animal trails. The Icknield Way may exemplify this type of road origination, where human and animal both selected the same natural line. By about 10,000 BC human travelers used rough roads/pathways.

- The world's oldest known paved road was constructed in Egypt some time between 2600 and 2200 BC.
- Corduroy roads (log roads) are found dating to 4000 BC in Glastonbury, England.
- The Sweet Track, a timber track causeway in England, is one of the oldest engineered roads discovered and the oldest timber trackway discovered in Northern Europe. Built in winter 3807 BC or spring 3806 BC, (tree-ring dating – dendrochronology – enabled very precise dating). It was claimed to be the oldest road in the world until the 2009 discovery of a 6,000-year-old trackway in Plumstead, London.
- In 500 BC, Darius I the Great started an extensive road system for the Achaemenid Empire (Persia), including the Royal Road, which was one of the finest highways of its time, connecting Sardis (the westernmost major city of the empire) to Susa. The road remained in use after Roman times. These road systems reached as far east as Bactria and India.
- In ancient times, transport by river was far easier and faster than transport by road, especially considering the cost of road construction and the difference in carrying capacity between carts and river barges. A hybrid of road transport and ship transport beginning in about 1740 is the horse-drawn boat in which the horse follows a cleared path along the river bank.
- From about 312 BC, the Roman Empire built straight strong stone Roman roads throughout Europe and North Africa, in support of its military campaigns. At its peak the Roman Empire was connected by 29 major roads moving out from Rome and covering 78,000 kilometers or 52,964 Roman miles of paved roads.
- In the 8th century AD, many roads were built throughout the Arab Empire. The most sophisticated roads were those in Baghdad, which were paved with tar. Tar was derived from petroleum, accessed from oil fields in the region, through the chemical process of destructive distillation.
- The Highways Act 1555 in Britain transferred responsibility for maintaining roads from government to local parishes. This resulted in a poor and variable state of roads. To remedy this, the first of the turnpike trusts was established around 1706, to build good roads and collect tolls from passing vehicles. Eventually there were approximately 1,100 trusts in Britain and some 36,800 km (22,900 mi) of engineered roads. The Rebecca Riots in Carmarthenshire and Rhayader from 1839 to 1844 contributed to a Royal Commission that led to the demise of the system in 1844, which coincided with the development of the UK railway system.
- In the late-19th century roading engineers began to cater for cyclists by building separate lanes alongside roadways.
- From the beginning of the 20th century, roads were increasingly built for tourism and also to create jobs. A typical example of the stimulation of tourism is the Great Dolomite Road, while the creation of the panoramic coastal road Strada Costiera between Duino and Barcola, Italy, in 1928 was very much focused on creating jobs.
- The Autostrada dei Laghi ("Lakes Motorway") in Italy, the first controlled-access highway built in the world, connecting Milan to Lake Como and Lake Maggiore, and now parts of the A8 and A9 motorways, was devised by Piero Puricelli and was inaugurated in 1924. This motorway, called autostrada, contained only one lane in each direction and no interchanges.

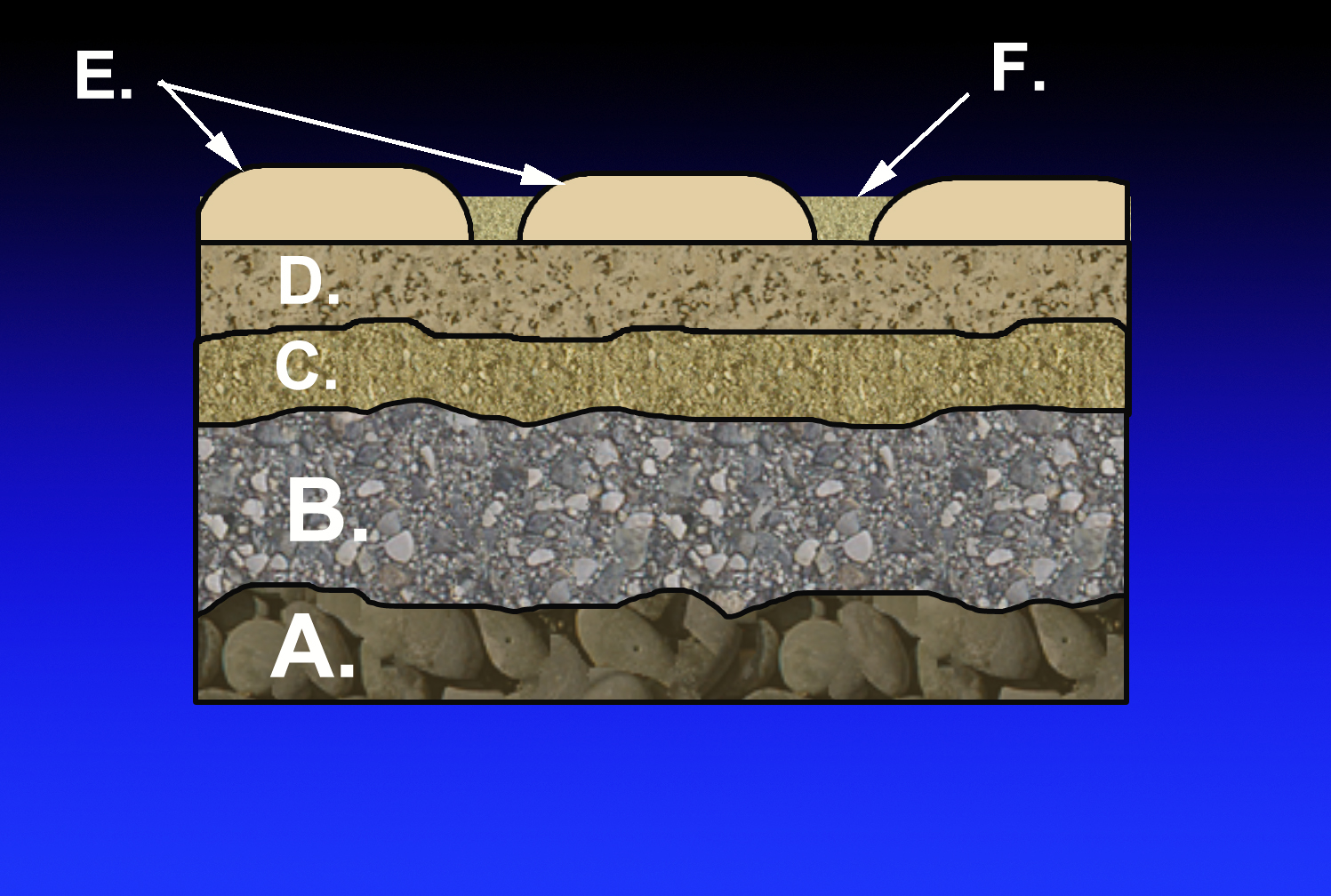
Layers in the construction of a mortarless pavement: A) Subgrade B) Subbase C) Base course D) Paver base E) Pavers F) Fine-grained sand

In transport engineering, subgrade is the native material underneath a constructed road.

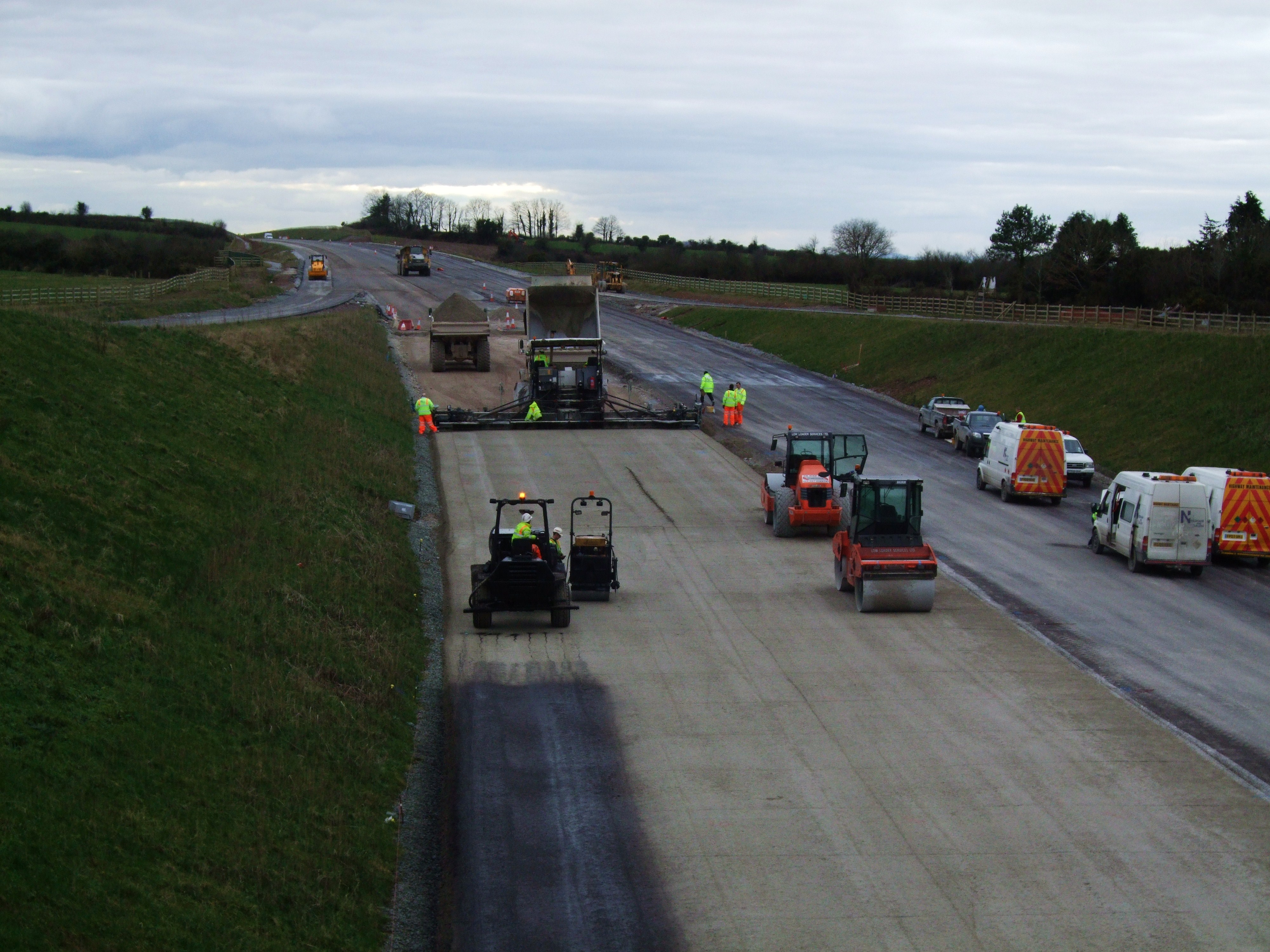
Sub-base layer composed of cement-based material being applied during construction of the M8 motorway in Ireland

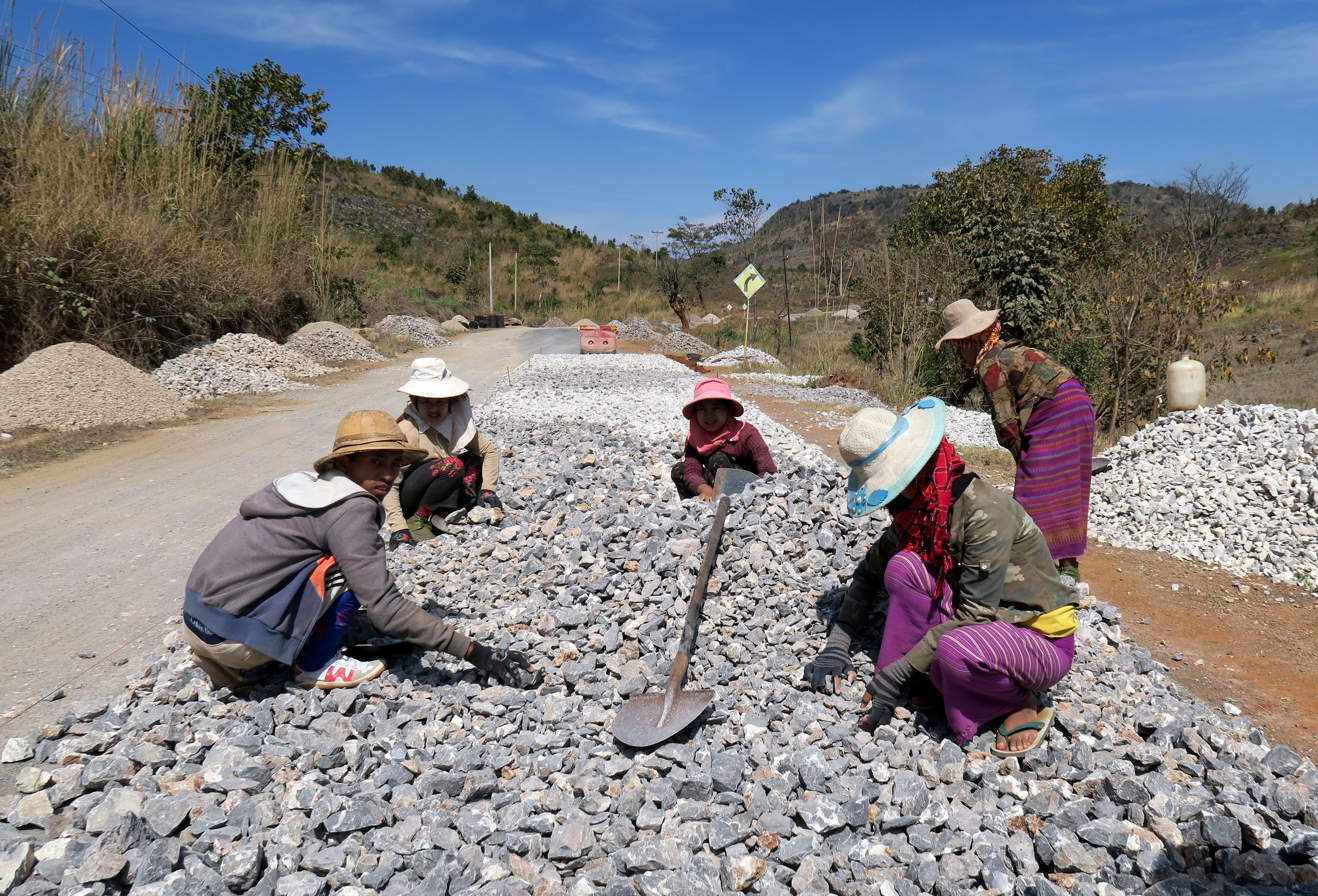
Road construction in Myanmar

Road construction requires the creation of an engineered continuous right-of-way or roadbed, overcoming geographic obstacles and having grades low enough to permit vehicle or foot travel, and may be required to meet standards set by law or official guidelines. The process is often begun with the removal of earth and rock by digging or blasting, construction of embankments, bridges and tunnels, and removal of vegetation (this may involve deforestation) and followed by the laying of pavement material. A variety of road building equipment is employed in road building.

After design, approval, planning, legal, and environmental considerations have been addressed alignment of the road is set out by a surveyor. The radii and gradient are designed and staked out to best suit the natural ground levels and minimize the amount of cut and fill. Great care is taken to preserve reference benchmarks.

Roads are designed and built for primary use by vehicular and pedestrian traffic. Storm drainage and environmental considerations are a major concern. Erosion and sediment controls are constructed to prevent detrimental effects. Drainage lines are laid with sealed joints in the road easement with runoff coefficients and characteristics adequate for the land zoning and storm water system. Drainage systems must be capable of carrying the ultimate design flow from the upstream catchment with approval for the outfall from the appropriate authority to a watercourse, creek, river or the sea for drainage discharge.

A borrow pit (source for obtaining fill, gravel, and rock) and a water source should be located near or in reasonable distance to the road construction site. Approval from local authorities may be required to draw water or for working (crushing and screening) of materials for construction needs. The topsoil and vegetation is removed from the borrow pit and stockpiled for subsequent rehabilitation of the extraction area. Side slopes in the excavation area are not steeper than one vertical to two horizontal for safety reasons.

Old road surfaces, fences, and buildings may need to be removed before construction can begin. Trees in the road construction area may be marked for retention. These protected trees should not have the topsoil within the area of the tree's drip line removed and the area should be kept clear of construction material and equipment. Compensation or replacement may be required if a protected tree is damaged. Much of the vegetation may be mulched and put aside for use during reinstatement. The topsoil is usually stripped and stockpiled nearby for rehabilitation of newly constructed embankments along the road. Stumps and roots are removed and holes filled as required before the earthwork begins. Final rehabilitation after road construction is completed will include seeding, planting, watering and other activities to reinstate the area to be consistent with the untouched surrounding areas.

Processes during earthwork include excavation, removal of material to spoil, filling, compacting, construction and trimming. If rock or other unsuitable material is discovered it is removed, moisture content is managed and replaced with standard fill compacted to meet the design requirements (generally 90–95% relative compaction). Blasting is not frequently used to excavate the roadbed as the intact rock structure forms an ideal road base. When a depression must be filled to come up to the road grade the native bed is compacted after the topsoil has been removed. The fill is made by the "compacted layer method" where a layer of fill is spread then compacted to specifications, under saturated conditions. The process is repeated until the desired grade is reached.

General fill material should be free of organics, meet minimum California bearing ratio (CBR) results and have a low plasticity index. The lower fill generally comprises sand or a sand-rich mixture with fine gravel, which acts as an inhibitor to the growth of plants or other vegetable matter. The compacted fill also serves as lower-stratum drainage. Select second fill (sieved) should be composed of gravel, decomposed rock or broken rock below a specified particle size and be free of large lumps of clay. Sand clay fill may also be used. The roadbed must be "proof rolled" after each layer of fill is compacted. If a roller passes over an area without creating visible deformation or spring the section is deemed to comply.

Geosynthetics such as geotextiles, geogrids, and geocells are frequently used in the various pavement layers to improve road quality. These materials and methods are used in low-traffic private roadways as well as public roads and highways. Geosynthetics perform four main functions in roads: separation, reinforcement, filtration, and drainage; which increase the pavement performance, reduce construction costs and decrease maintenance.

The completed roadway is finished by paving or left with a gravel or other natural surface. The type of road surface is dependent on economic factors and expected usage. Safety improvements such as traffic signs, crash barriers, raised pavement markers and other forms of road surface marking are installed.

According to a May 2009 report by the American Association of State Highway and Transportation Officials (AASHTO) and TRIP – a national transportation research organization – driving on rough roads costs the average American motorist approximately $400 a year in extra vehicle operating costs. Drivers living in urban areas with populations more than 250,000 are paying upwards of $750 more annually because of accelerated vehicle deterioration, increased maintenance, additional fuel consumption, and tire wear caused by poor road conditions.

When a single carriageway road is converted into dual carriageway by building a second separate carriageway alongside the first, it is usually referred to as duplication, twinning or doubling. The original carriageway is changed from two-way to become one-way, while the new carriageway is one-way in the opposite direction. In the same way as converting railway lines from single track to double track, the new carriageway is not always constructed directly alongside the existing carriageway.

== Reallocation ==
Roads that are intended for use by a particular mode of transport can be reallocated for another mode of transport, i.e. by using traffic signs. For instance, in the ongoing road space reallocation effort, some roads (particularly in city centers) which are intended for use by cars are increasingly being repurposed for cycling and/or walking.

== Maintenance ==
"Road works ahead" sign, typically used in Europe

Like all structures, roads deteriorate over time. Deterioration is primarily due to environmental effects such as frost heaves, thermal cracking and oxidation often contribute, however accumulated damage from vehicles also contributes. According to a series of experiments carried out in the late 1950s, called the AASHO Road Test, it was empirically determined that the effective damage done to the road is roughly proportional to the fourth power of axle weight. A typical tractor-trailer weighing 80,000 pounds (36.287 t) with 8,000 pounds (3.629 t) on the steer axle and 36,000 pounds (16.329 t) on both of the tandem axle groups is expected to do 7,800 times more damage than a passenger vehicle with 2,000 pounds (0.907 t) on each axle. Potholes on roads are caused by rain damage and vehicle braking or related construction work.

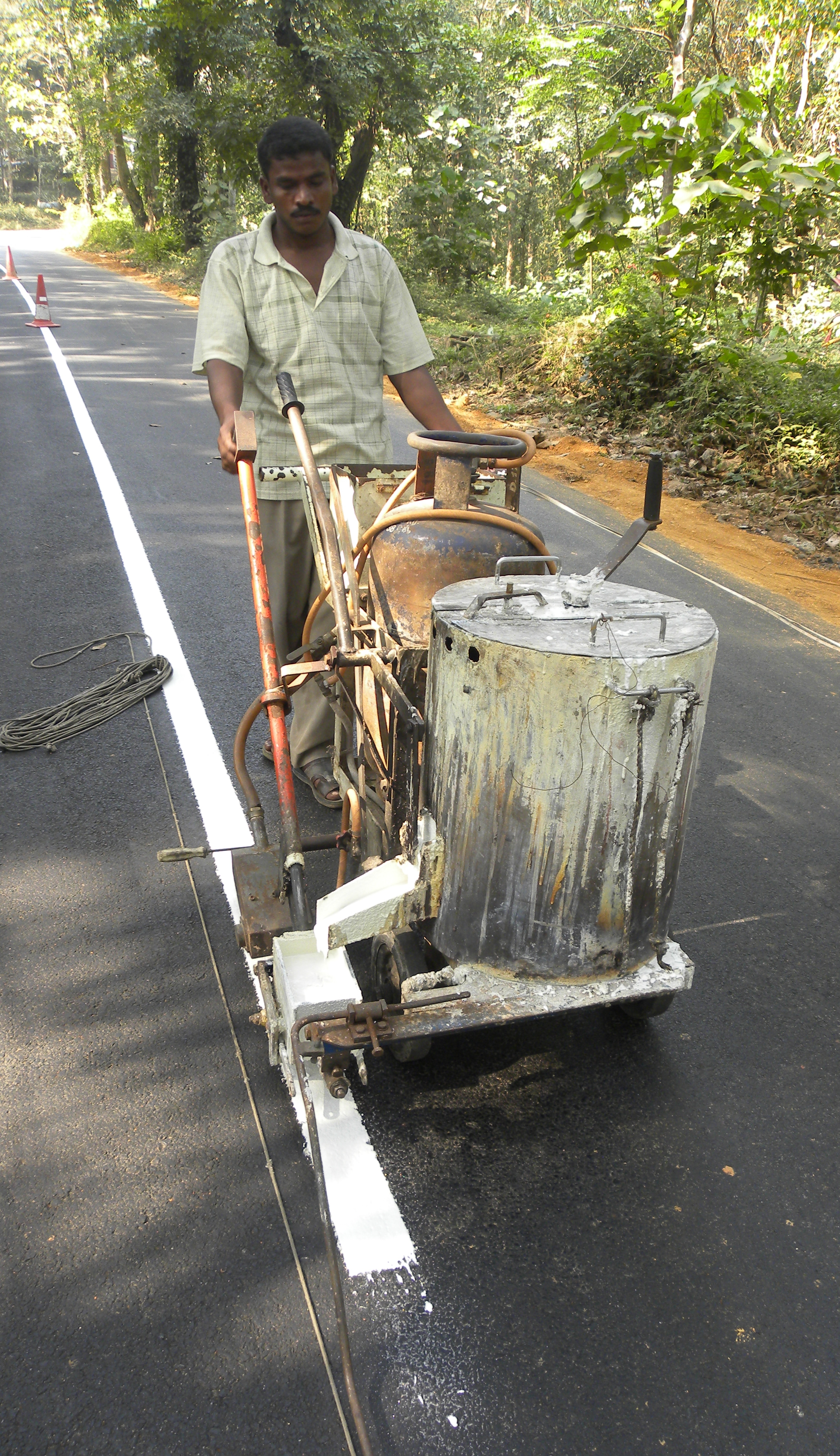
Line marking in rural India

Pavements are designed for an expected service life or design life. In some parts of the United Kingdom the standard design life is 40 years for new bitumen and concrete pavement. Maintenance is considered in the whole life cost of the road with service at 10, 20 and 30-year milestones. Roads can be and are designed for a variety of lives (8-, 15-, 30-, and 60-year designs). When pavement lasts longer than its intended life, it may have been overbuilt, and the original costs may have been too high. When a pavement fails before its intended design life, the owner may have excessive repair and rehabilitation costs. Some asphalt pavements are designed as perpetual pavements with an expected structural life in excess of 50 years.

Many asphalt pavements built over 35 years ago, despite not being specifically designed as a perpetual pavement, have remained in good condition long past their design life. Many concrete pavements built since the 1950s have significantly outlived their intended design lives. Some roads like Chicago's Wacker Drive, a major two-level (and at one point, three-level) roadway in the downtown area, are being rebuilt with a designed service life of 100 years.

Virtually all roads require some form of maintenance before they come to the end of their service life. Pro-active agencies use pavement management techniques to continually monitor road conditions and schedule preventive maintenance treatments as needed to prolong the lifespan of their roads. Technically advanced agencies monitor the road network surface condition with sophisticated equipment such as laser/inertial profilometers. These measurements include road curvature, cross slope, asperity, roughness, rutting and texture. Software algorithms use this data to recommend maintenance or new construction.

Maintenance treatments for asphalt concrete generally include thin asphalt overlays, crack sealing, surface rejuvenating, fog sealing, micro milling or diamond grinding and surface treatments. Waterblasting can also be part of the maintenance. It increases the friction of the surface through a slight removal of the top bitumen layer as well as brigheting the surface which leads to less wear through temperature in the bottom layers of the surface.

Thin surfacing preserves, protects and improves the functional condition of the road while reducing the need for routing maintenance, leading to extended service life without increasing structural capacity.

Older concrete pavements that develop faults can be repaired with a dowel bar retrofit, in which slots are cut in the pavement at each joint, and dowel bars are placed in the slots, which are then filled with concrete patching material. This can extend the life of the concrete pavement for 15 years.

Responsibility for road maintenance lies with public authorities at various levels of government including state and local government in the United States, supported by the Federal Highway Administration, National Highways and local authorities in England, Transport Scotland in Scotland. Some roads are constructed and maintained by a private-sector consortium established under a public-private partnership such as those in England funded by the Private Finance Initiative.

Failure to maintain roads properly can create significant costs to society. A 2009 report released by the American Association of State Highway and Transportation Officials estimated that about 50% of the roads in the US are in bad condition, with urban areas worse. The report estimates that urban drivers pay an average of $746/year on vehicle repairs while the average US motorist pays about $335/year. In contrast, the average motorist pays about $171/year in road maintenance taxes (based on 600 gallons/year and $0.285/gallon tax).

=== Slab stabilization ===
Distress and serviceability loss on concrete roads can be caused by loss of support due to voids beneath the concrete pavement slabs. The voids usually occur near cracks or joints due to surface water infiltration. The most common causes of voids are pumping, consolidation, subgrade failure and bridge approach failure. Slab stabilization is a non-destructive method of solving this problem and is usually employed with other concrete pavement restoration methods including patching and diamond grinding. The technique restores support to concrete slabs by filing small voids that develop underneath the concrete slab at joints, cracks or the pavement edge.

The process consists of pumping a cementitious grout or polyurethane mixture through holes drilled through the slab. The grout can fill small voids beneath the slab and/or sub-base. The grout also displaces free water and helps keep water from saturating and weakening support under the joints and slab edge after stabilization is complete. The three steps for this method after finding the voids are locating and drilling holes, grout injection and post-testing the stabilized slabs.

Slab stabilization does not correct depressions, increase the design structural capacity, stop erosion or eliminate faulting. It does, however, restore the slab support, therefore, decreasing deflections under the load. Stabilization should only be performed at joints and cracks where the loss of support exists. Visual inspection is the simplest manner to find voids. Signs that repair is needed are transverse joint faulting, corner breaks and shoulder drop off and lines at or near joints and cracks. Deflection testing is another common procedure used to locate voids. It is recommended to do this testing at night as during cooler temperatures, joints open, aggregate interlock diminishes and load deflections are at their highest.

=== Testing ===
Ground penetrating radar pulses electromagnetic waves into the pavement and measures and graphically displays the reflected signal. This can reveal voids and other defects.

The epoxy/core test, detects voids by visual and mechanical methods. It consists of drilling a 25 to 50 millimeter hole through the pavement into the sub-base with a dry-bit roto-hammer. Next, a two-part epoxy is poured into the hole – dyed for visual clarity. Once the epoxy hardens, technicians drill through the hole. If a void is present, the epoxy will stick to the core and provide physical evidence.

Common stabilization materials include pozzolan-cement grout and polyurethane. The requirements for slab stabilization are strength and the ability to flow into or expand to fill small voids. Colloidal mixing equipment is necessary to use the pozzolan-cement grouts. The contractor must place the grout using a positive-displacement injection pump or a non-pulsing progressive cavity pump. A drill is also necessary but it must produce a clean hole with no surface spalling or breakouts. The injection devices must include a grout packer capable of sealing the hole. The injection device must also have a return hose or a fast-control reverse switch, in case workers detect slab movement on the uplift gauge. The uplift beam helps to monitor the slab deflection and has to have sensitive dial gauges.

=== Joint sealing ===
Also called joint and crack repair, this method's purpose is to minimize infiltration of surface water and incompressible material into the joint system. Joint sealants are also used to reduce dowel bar corrosion in concrete pavement restoration techniques. Successful resealing consists of old sealant removal, shaping and cleaning the reservoir, installing the backer rod and installing the sealant. Sawing, manual removal, plowing and cutting are methods used to remove the old sealant. Saws are used to shape the reservoir. When cleaning the reservoir, no dust, dirt or traces of old sealant should remain. Thus, it is recommended to water wash, sand-blast and then air blow to remove any sand, dirt or dust. The backer rod installation requires a double-wheeled, steel roller to insert the rod to the desired depth. After inserting the backer rod, the sealant is placed into the joint. There are various materials to choose for this method including hot pour bituminous liquid, silicone and preformed compression seals.

== Safety considerations ==
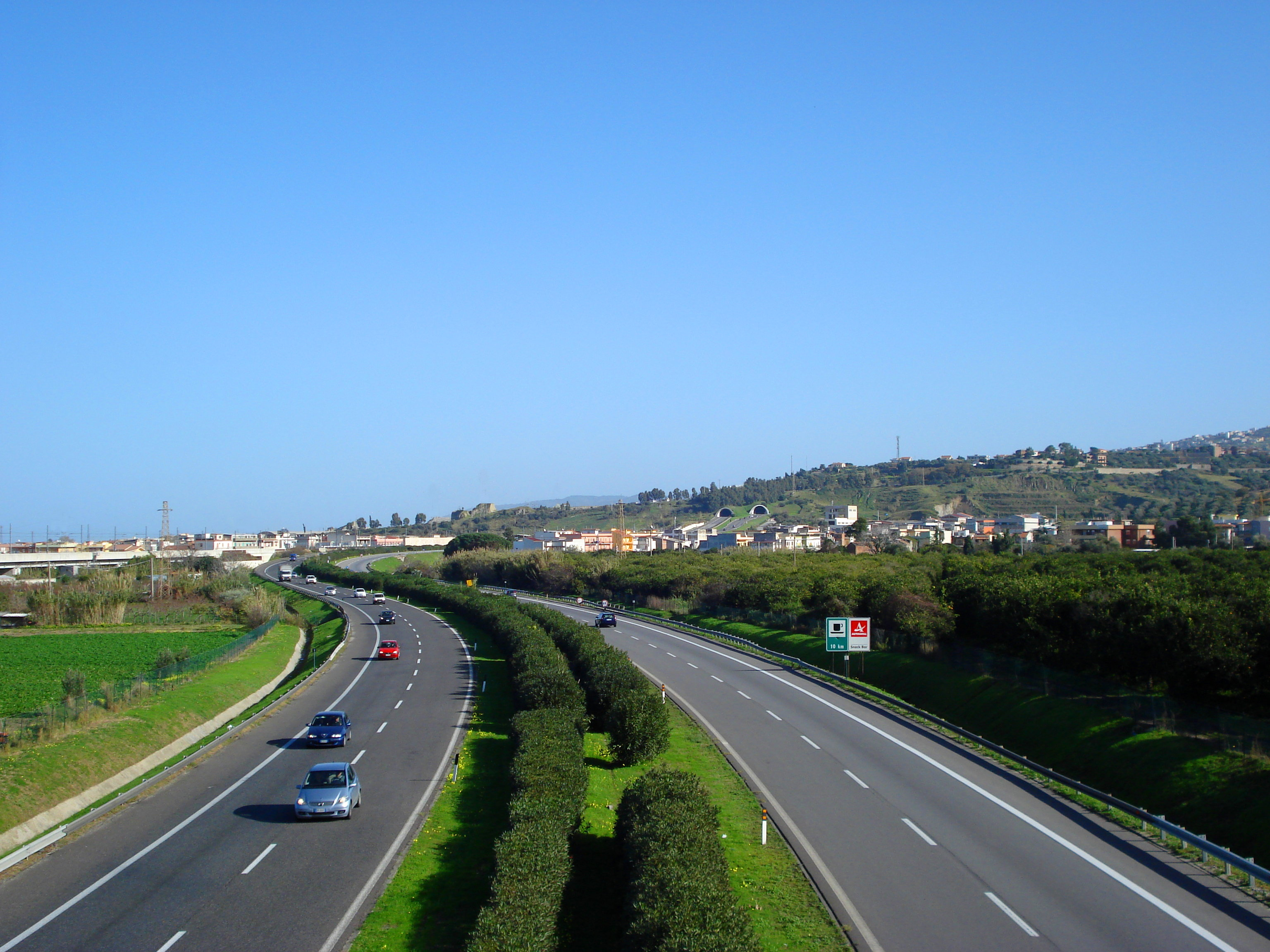
The Autostrada A20 (Italy) with large central median

Careful design and construction of roads can increase road traffic safety and reduce the harm (deaths, injuries, and property damage) on the highway system from traffic collisions.

On neighborhood roads traffic calming, safety barriers, pedestrian crossings and cycle lanes can help protect pedestrians, cyclists, and drivers.

Lane markers in some countries and states are marked with Cat's eyes or Botts dots. Botts dots are not used where it is icy in the winter, because frost and snowplows can break the glue that holds them to the road, although they can be embedded in short, shallow trenches carved in the roadway, as is done in the mountainous regions of California.

For major roads risk can be reduced by providing limited access from properties and local roads, grade separated junctions and median dividers between opposite-direction traffic to reduce the likelihood of head-on collisions.

The placement of energy attenuation devices (e.g. guardrails, wide grassy areas, sand barrels) is also common. Some road fixtures such as road signs and fire hydrants are designed to collapse on impact. Light poles are designed to break at the base rather than violently stop a car that hits them. Highway authorities may also remove larger trees from the immediate vicinity of the road. During heavy rains, if the elevation of the road surface is not higher than the surrounding landscape, it may result in flooding.

Speed limits can improve road traffic safety and reduce the number of road traffic casualties from traffic collisions. In their World report on road traffic injury prevention report, the World Health Organization (WHO) identify speed control as one of various interventions likely to contribute to a reduction in road casualties.

== Road conditions ==
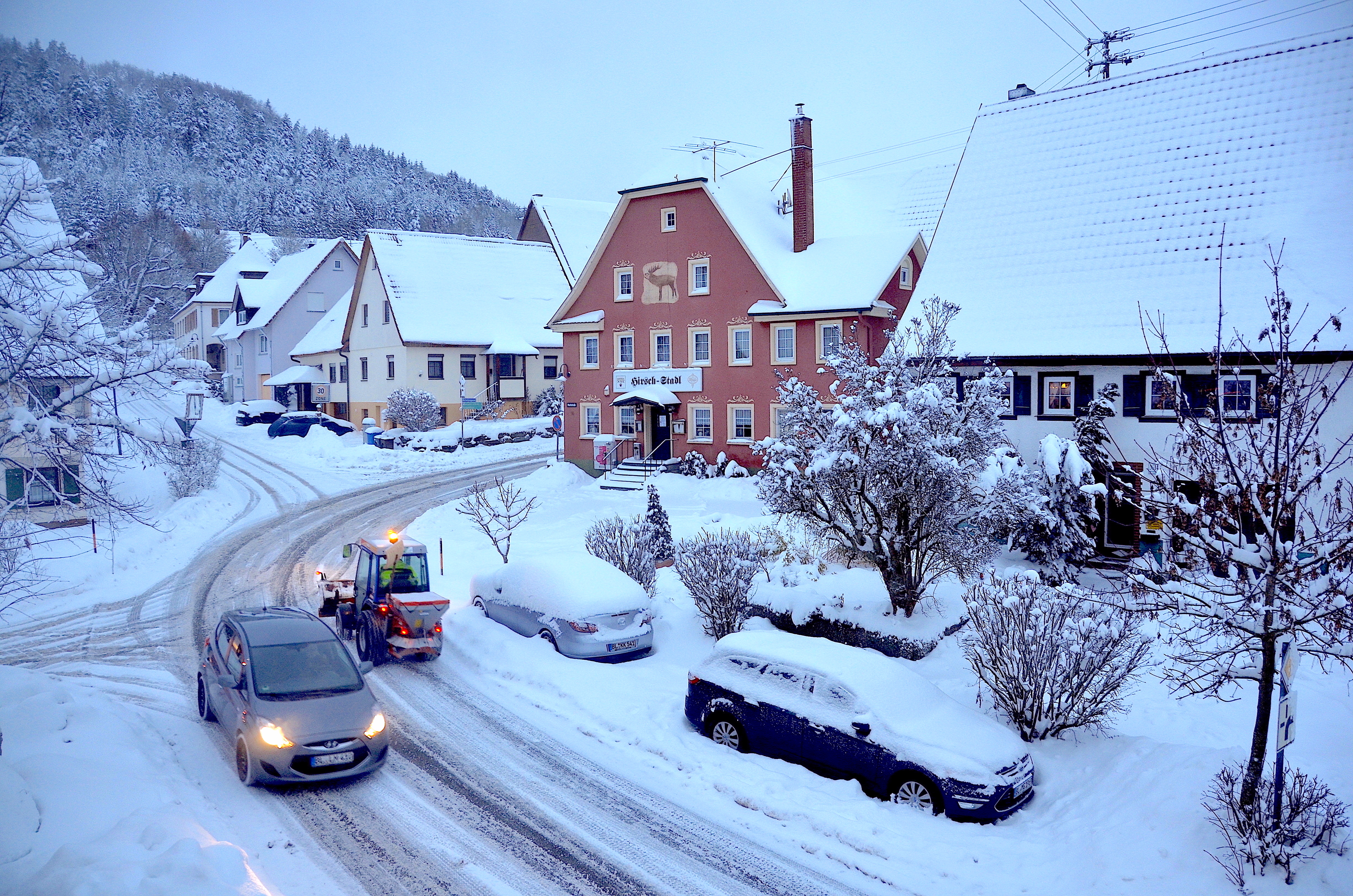
Snow causing bad road conditions

Road conditions are the collection of factors describing the ease of driving on a particular stretch of road, or on the roads of a particular locality, including the quality of the pavement surface, potholes, road markings, and weather. It has been reported that "[p]roblems of transportation participants and road conditions are the main factors that lead to road traffic accidents". It has further been specifically noted that "weather conditions and road conditions are interlinked as weather conditions affect the road conditions". Specific aspects of road conditions can be of particular importance for particular purposes. For example, for autonomous vehicles such as self-driving cars, significant road conditions can include "shadowing and lighting changes, road surface texture changes, and road markings consisting of circular reflectors, dashed lines, and solid lines".

Various government agencies and private entities, including local news services, track and report on road conditions to the public so that drivers going through a particular area can be aware of hazards that may exist in that area. News agencies, in turn, rely on tips from area residents with respect to certain aspects of road conditions in their coverage area.

== Environmental performance ==
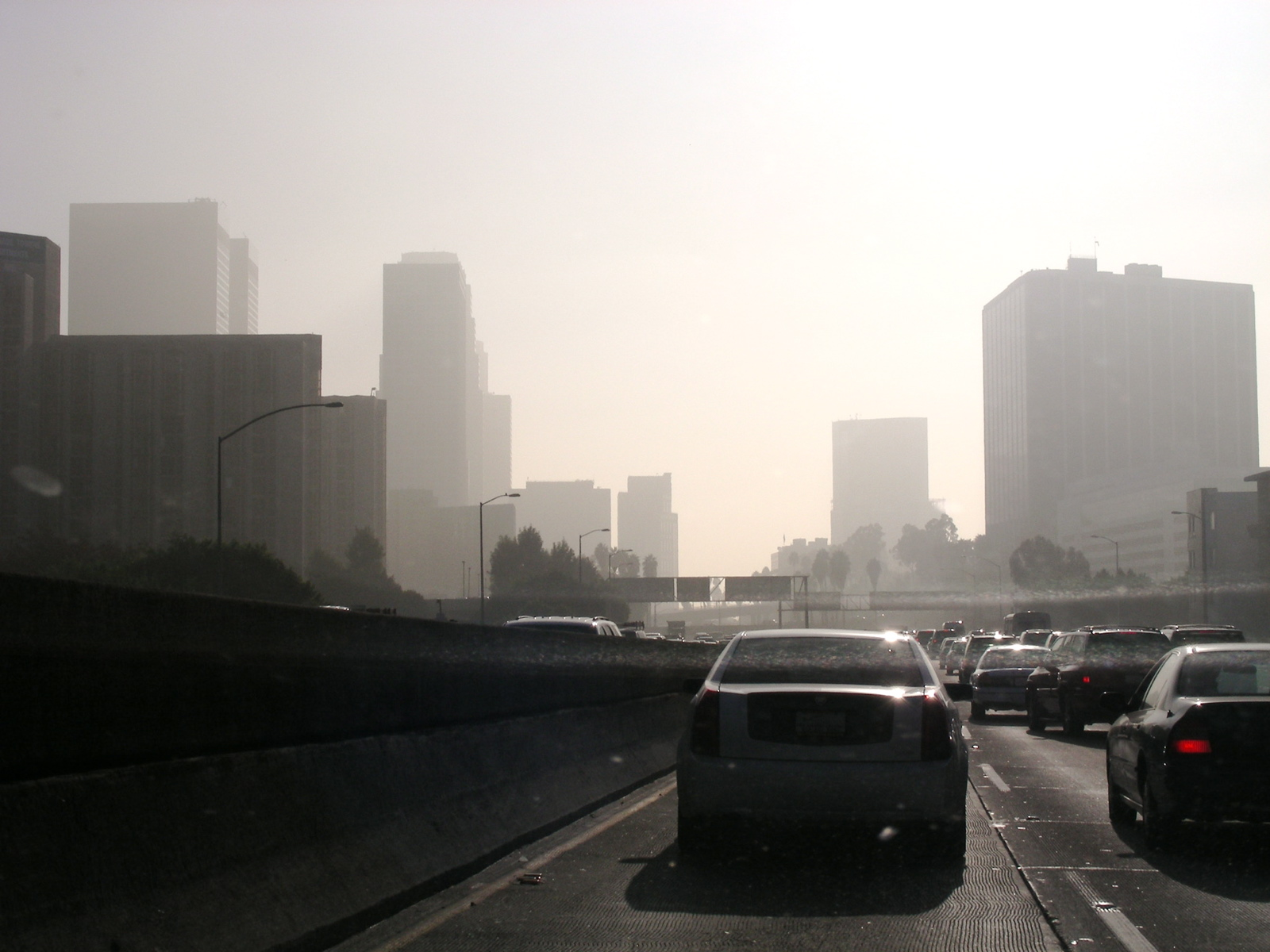
Air pollution along Pasadena Highway in Los Angeles

Careful design and construction of a road can reduce any negative environmental impacts. Water management systems can be used to reduce the effect of pollutants from roads. Rainwater and snowmelt running off of roads tends to pick up gasoline, motor oil, heavy metals, trash and other pollutants and result in water pollution. Road runoff is a major source of nickel, copper, zinc, cadmium, lead and polycyclic aromatic hydrocarbons (PAHs), which are created as combustion byproducts of gasoline and other fossil fuels.

De-icing chemicals and sand can run off into roadsides, contaminate groundwater and pollute surface waters; and road salts can be toxic to sensitive plants and animals. Sand applied to icy roads can be ground up by traffic into fine particulates and contribute to air pollution.

Roads are a chief source of noise pollution. In the early 1970s, it was recognized that design of roads can be conducted to influence and minimize noise generation. Noise barriers can reduce noise pollution near built-up areas. Regulations can restrict the use of engine braking.

Motor vehicle emissions contribute air pollution. Concentrations of air pollutants and adverse respiratory health effects are greater near the road than at some distance away from the road. Road dust kicked up by vehicles may trigger allergic reactions. In addition, on-road transportation greenhouse gas emissions are the largest single cause of climate change, scientists say.

== Regulation ==
=== Right- and left-hand traffic ===
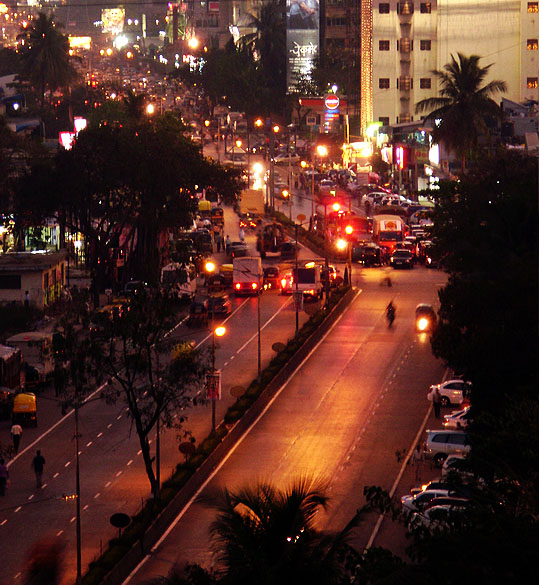
A city street in Mumbai, India with left-hand traffic

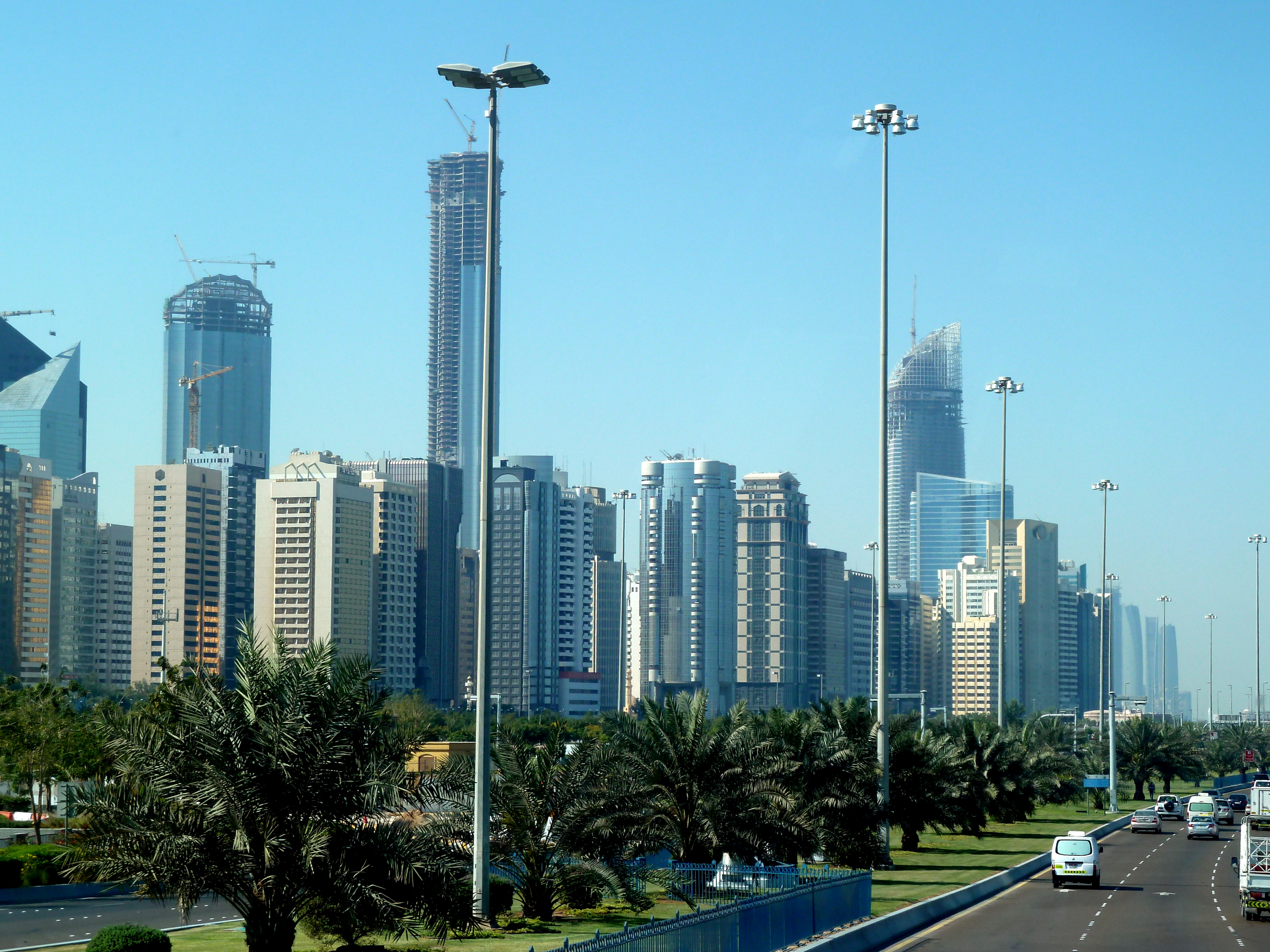
Right-hand traffic in nearby Abu Dhabi, Middle East

Traffic flows on the right or on the left side of the road depending on the country. In countries where traffic flows on the right, traffic signs are mostly on the right side of the road, roundabouts and traffic circles go counter-clockwise/anti-clockwise, and pedestrians crossing a two-way road should watch out for traffic from the left first. In countries where traffic flows on the left, the reverse is true.

About 33% of the world by population drive on the left, and 67% keep right. By road distances, about 28% drive on the left, and 72% on the right, even though originally most traffic drove on the left worldwide.

== Economics ==
Transport economics is used to understand both the relationship between the transport system and the wider economy and the complex effects of the road network structure when there are multiple paths and competing modes for both personal and freight (road/rail/air/ferry) and where induced demand can result in increased on decreased transport levels when road provision is increased by building new roads or decreased (for example California State Route 480). Roads are generally built and maintained by the public sector using taxation although implementation may be through private contractors). or occasionally using road tolls.

Public-private partnerships are a way for communities to address the rising cost by injecting private funds into the infrastructure. There are four main ones:

- design/build
- design/build/operate/maintain
- design/build/finance/operate
- build/own/operate

Society depends heavily on efficient roads. In the European Union (EU) 44% of all goods are moved by trucks over roads and 85% of all people are transported by cars, buses or coaches on roads. The term was also commonly used to refer to roadsteads, waterways that lent themselves to use by shipping.

=== Construction costs ===
According to the New York State Thruway Authority, some sample per-mile costs to construct multi-lane roads in several US northeastern states were:

- Connecticut Turnpike – $3,449,000 per mile
- New Jersey Turnpike – $2,200,000 per mile
- Pennsylvania Turnpike (Delaware Extension) – $1,970,000 per mile
- Northern Indiana Toll Road – $1,790,000 per mile
- Garden State Parkway – $1,720,000 per mile
- Massachusetts Turnpike – $1,600,000 per mile
- Thruway, New York to Pennsylvania Line – $1,547,000 per mile
- Ohio Turnpike – $1,352,000 per mile
- Pennsylvania Turnpike (early construction) – $736,000 per mile

== Statistics ==
The United States has the largest network of roads of any country with 4,050,717 miles (6,518,997 km) as of 2009. The Republic of India has the second-largest road system globally with 4,689,842 kilometres (2,914,133 miles) of road (2013). The People's Republic of China is third with 3,583,715 kilometres (2,226,817 mi) of road (2007). The Federative Republic of Brazil has the fourth-largest road system in the world with 1,751,868 kilometres (1,088,560 mi) (2002). See List of countries by road network size. When looking only at expressways, the National Trunk Highway System (NTHS) in China has a total length of 45,000 kilometres (28,000 mi) at the end of 2006, and 60,300 km at the end of 2008, second only to the United States with 90,000 kilometres (56,000 mi) in 2005. However, as of 2017, China has 130,000 km of Expressways.

== Global connectivity ==
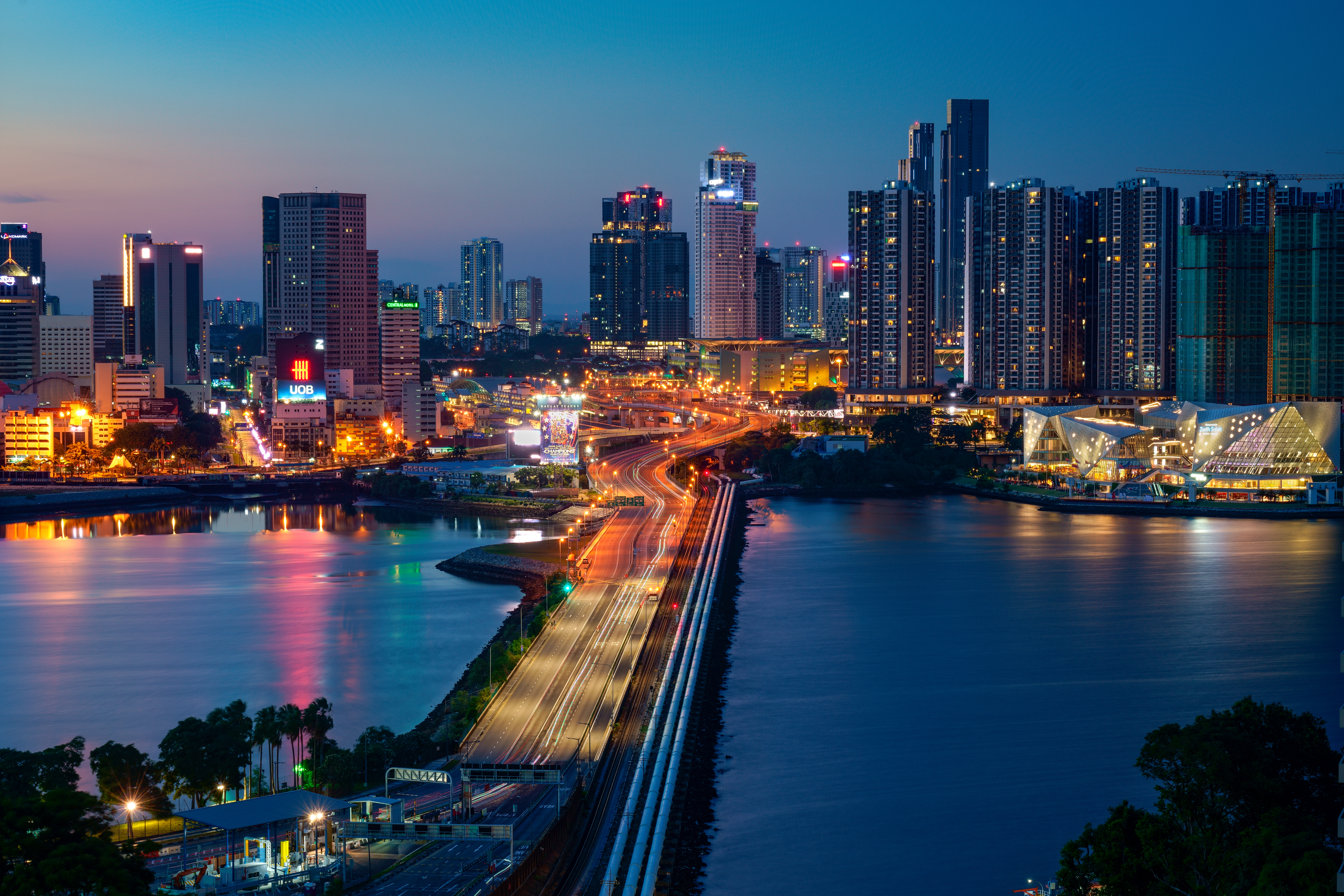
The Johor–Singapore Causeway traversing the Strait of Johor is one of the world's busiest international border crossings. Johor Bahru is in the background.

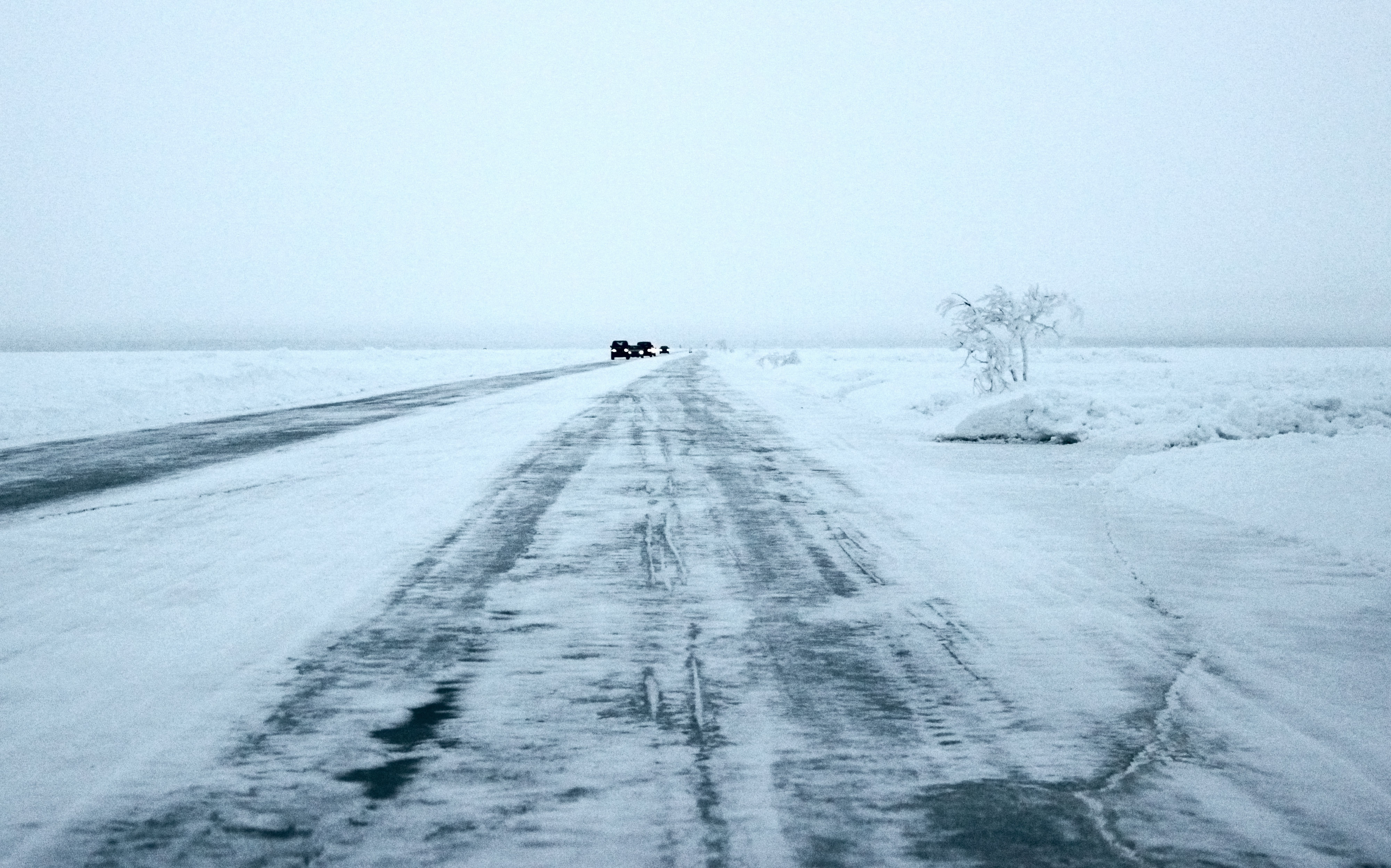
Ice road between Oulunsalo and Hailuoto in North Ostrobothnia, Finland

Eurasia, Africa, North America, South America, and Australia each have an extensive road network that connects most cities. The North and South American road networks are separated by the Darién Gap, the only interruption in the Pan-American Highway. Eurasia and Africa are connected by roads on the Sinai Peninsula. The European Peninsula is connected to the Scandinavian Peninsula by the Øresund Bridge, and both have many connections to the mainland of Eurasia, including the bridges over the Bosphorus. Antarctica has very few roads and no continent-bridging network, though there are a few ice roads between bases, such as the South Pole Traverse. Bahrain is the only island country to be connected to a continental network by road (the King Fahd Causeway to Saudi Arabia).

Even well-connected road networks are controlled by many different legal jurisdictions, and laws such as which side of the road to drive on vary accordingly.

Many populated domestic islands are connected to the mainland by bridges. A very long example is the 113 mi (182 km) Overseas Highway connecting many of the Florida Keys with the continental United States.

Even on mainlands, some settlements have no roads connecting with the primary continental network, due to natural obstacles like mountains or wetlands, or high cost compared to the population served. Unpaved roads or lack of roads are more common in developing countries, and these can become impassible in wet conditions. As of 2014, only 43% of rural Africans have access to an all-season road. Due to steepness, mud, snow, or fords, roads can sometimes be passable only to four-wheel drive vehicles, those with snow chains or snow tires, or those capable of deep wading or amphibious operation.

Most disconnected settlements have local road networks connecting ports, buildings, and other points of interest.

Where demand for travel by road vehicle to a disconnected island or mainland settlement is high, roll-on/roll-off ferries are commonly available if the journey is relatively short. For long-distance trips, passengers usually travel by air and rent a car upon arrival. If facilities are available, vehicles and cargo can also be shipped to many disconnected settlements by boat, or air transport at much greater expense. The island of Great Britain is connected to the European road network by Eurotunnel Shuttle – an example of a car shuttle train which is a service used in other parts of Europe to travel under mountains and over wetlands.

In polar areas, disconnected settlements are often more easily reached by snowmobile or dogsled in cold weather, which can produce sea ice that blocks ports, and bad weather that prevents flying. For example, resupply aircraft are only flown to Amundsen–Scott South Pole Station October to February, and many residents of coastal Alaska have bulk cargo shipped in only during the warmer months. Permanent darkness during the winter can also make long-distance travel more dangerous in polar areas. Continental road networks do reach into these areas, such as the Dalton Highway to the North Slope of Alaska, the R21 highway to Murmansk in Russia, and many roads in Scandinavia (though due to fjords water transport is sometimes faster). Large areas of Alaska, Canada, Greenland, and Siberia are sparsely connected. For example, all 25 communities of Nunavut are disconnected from each other and the main North American road network.

Road transport of people and cargo by may also be obstructed by border controls and travel restrictions. For example, travel from other parts of Asia to South Korea would require passage through the hostile country of North Korea. Moving between most countries in Africa and Eurasia would require passing through Egypt and Israel, which is a politically sensitive area.

Some places are intentionally car-free, and roads (if present) might be used by bicycles or pedestrians.

Roads are under construction to many remote places, such as the villages of the Annapurna Circuit, and a road was completed in 2013 to Mêdog County. However, in some remote mountain areas, road (or transport) development can be devastating to communities, causing tourism to be cut off and settlements to be abandoned. Additional intercontinental and transoceanic fixed links have been proposed, including a Bering Strait crossing that would connect Eurasia-Africa and North America, a Malacca Strait Bridge to the largest island of Indonesia from Asia, and a Strait of Gibraltar crossing to connect Europe and Africa directly.

== See also ==
- Glossary of road transport terms
- Highway engineering
- Issue tracking systems for reporting road defects
- List of countries by road network size
- List of roads and highways
- Road transport
- Trade route
