= List of car-free islands =

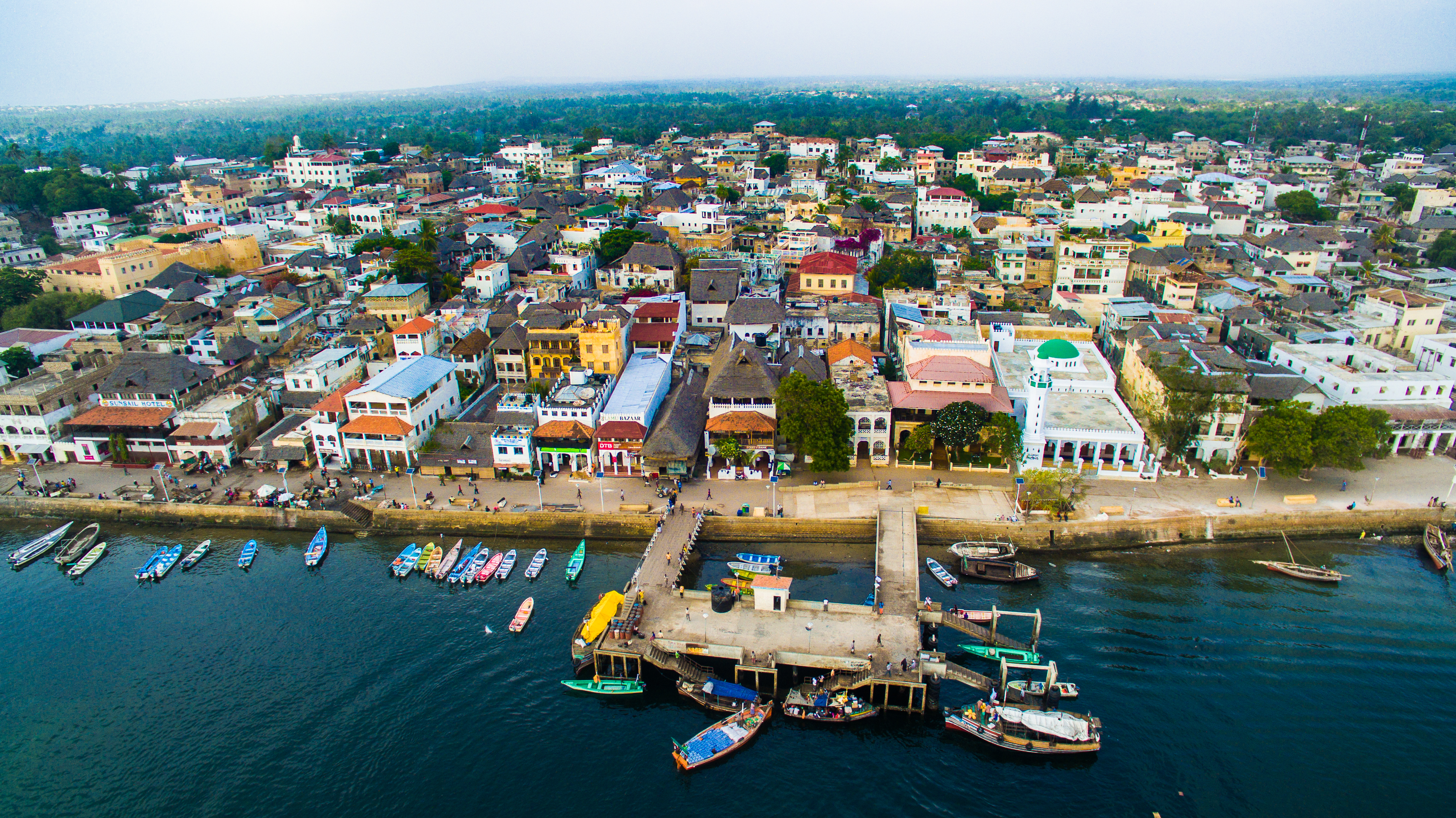
Lamu Island, Kenya

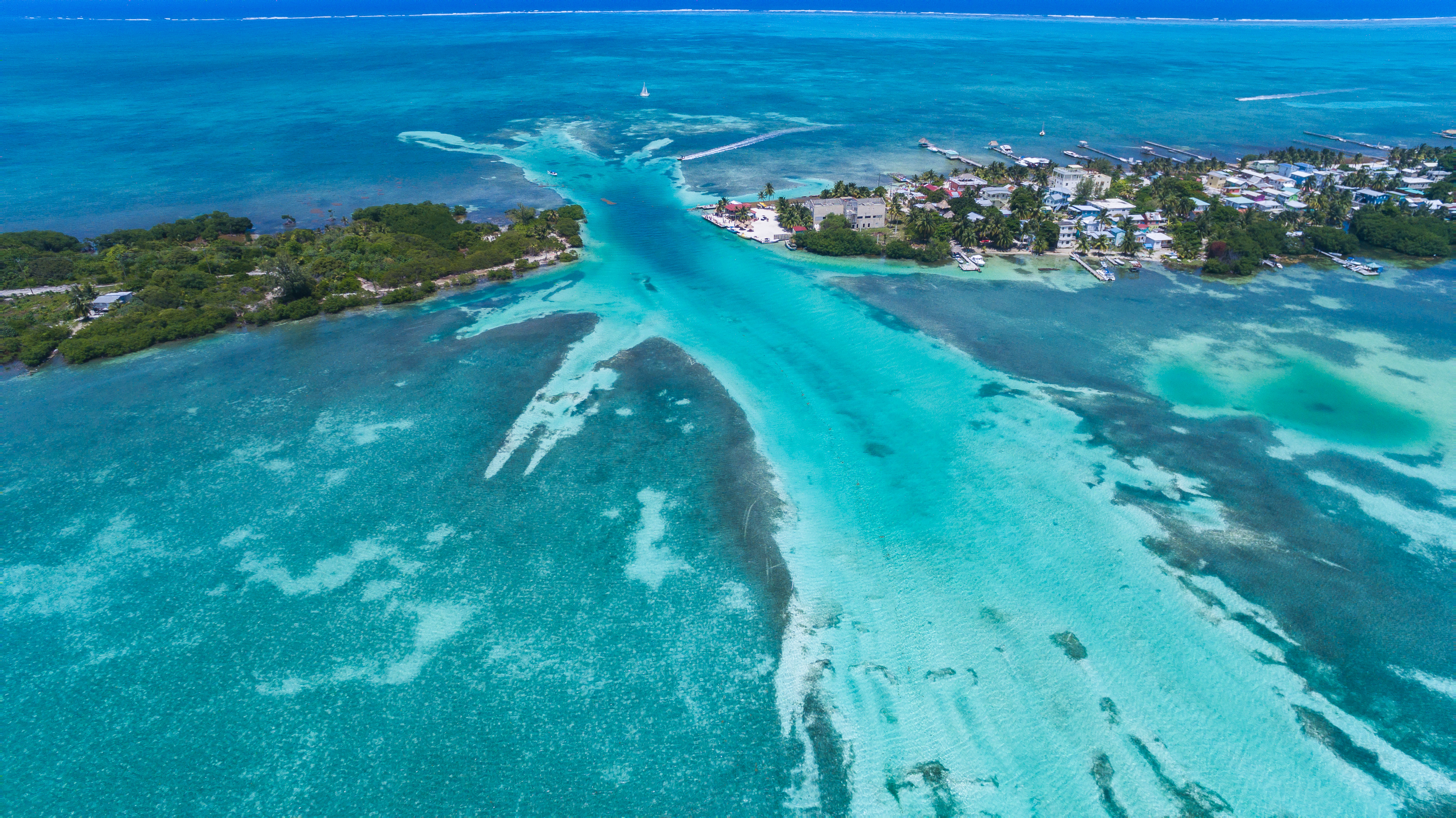
Caye Caulker, Belize

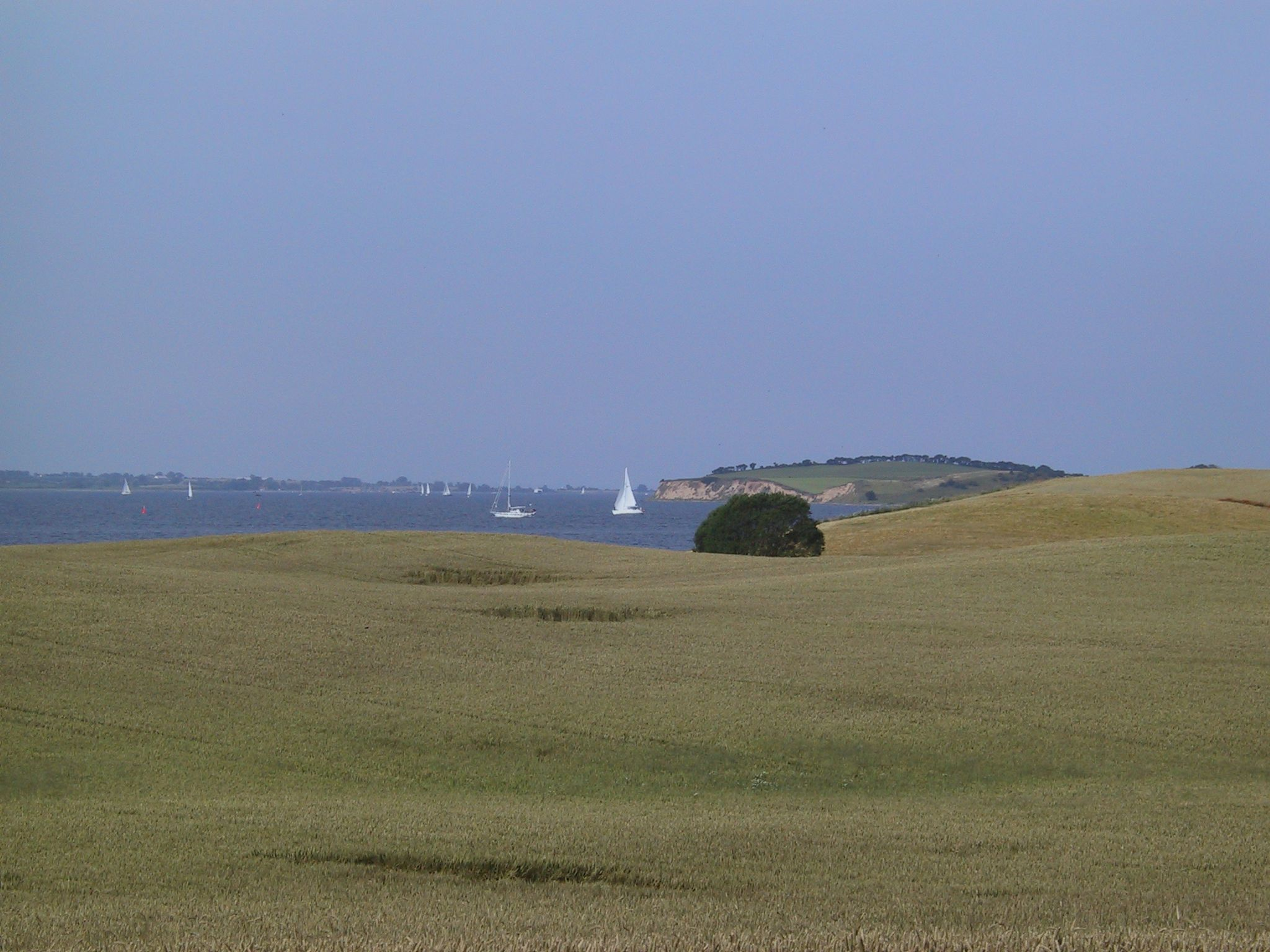
Bjørnø, Denmark

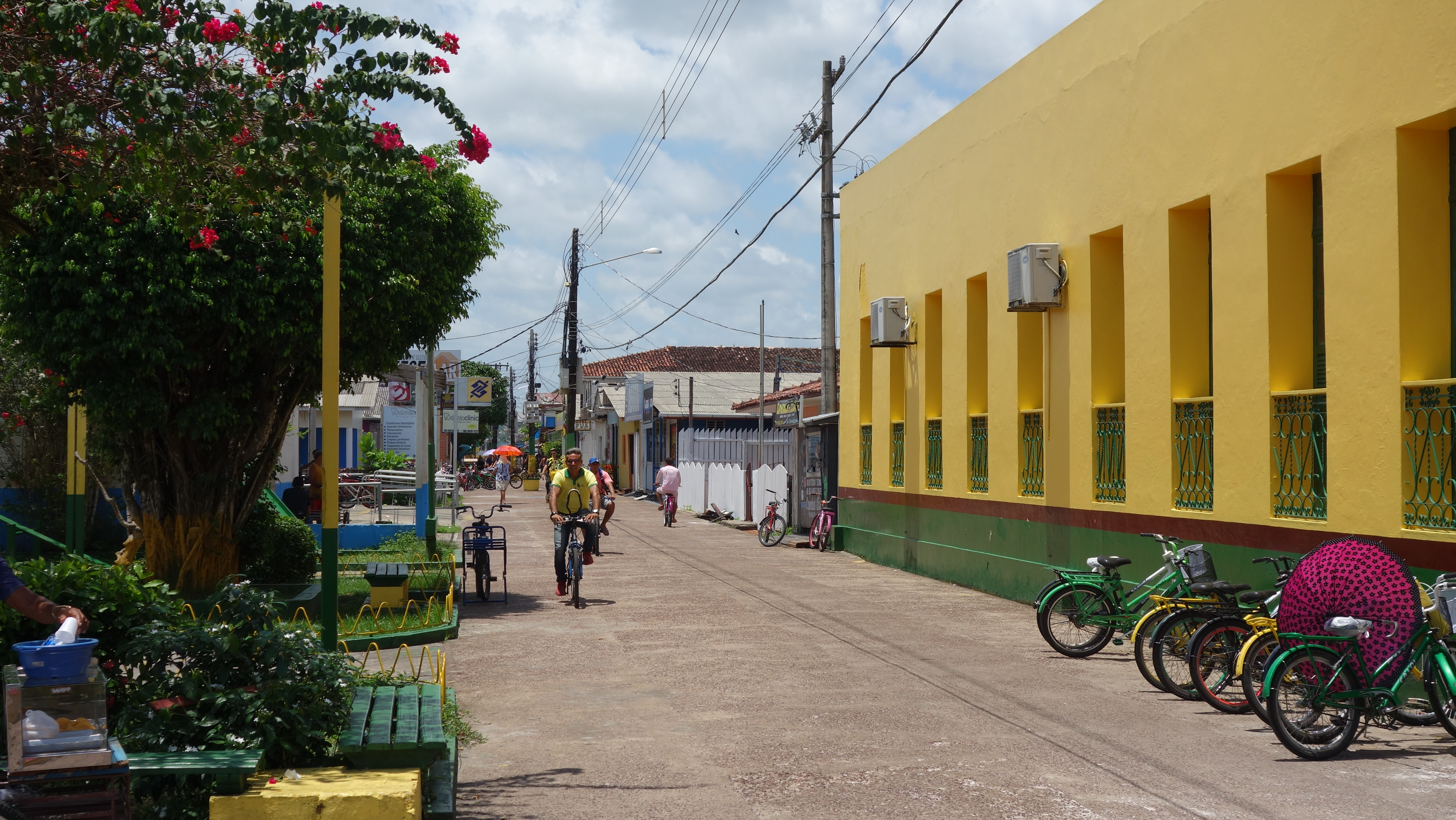
Afuá, Brazil

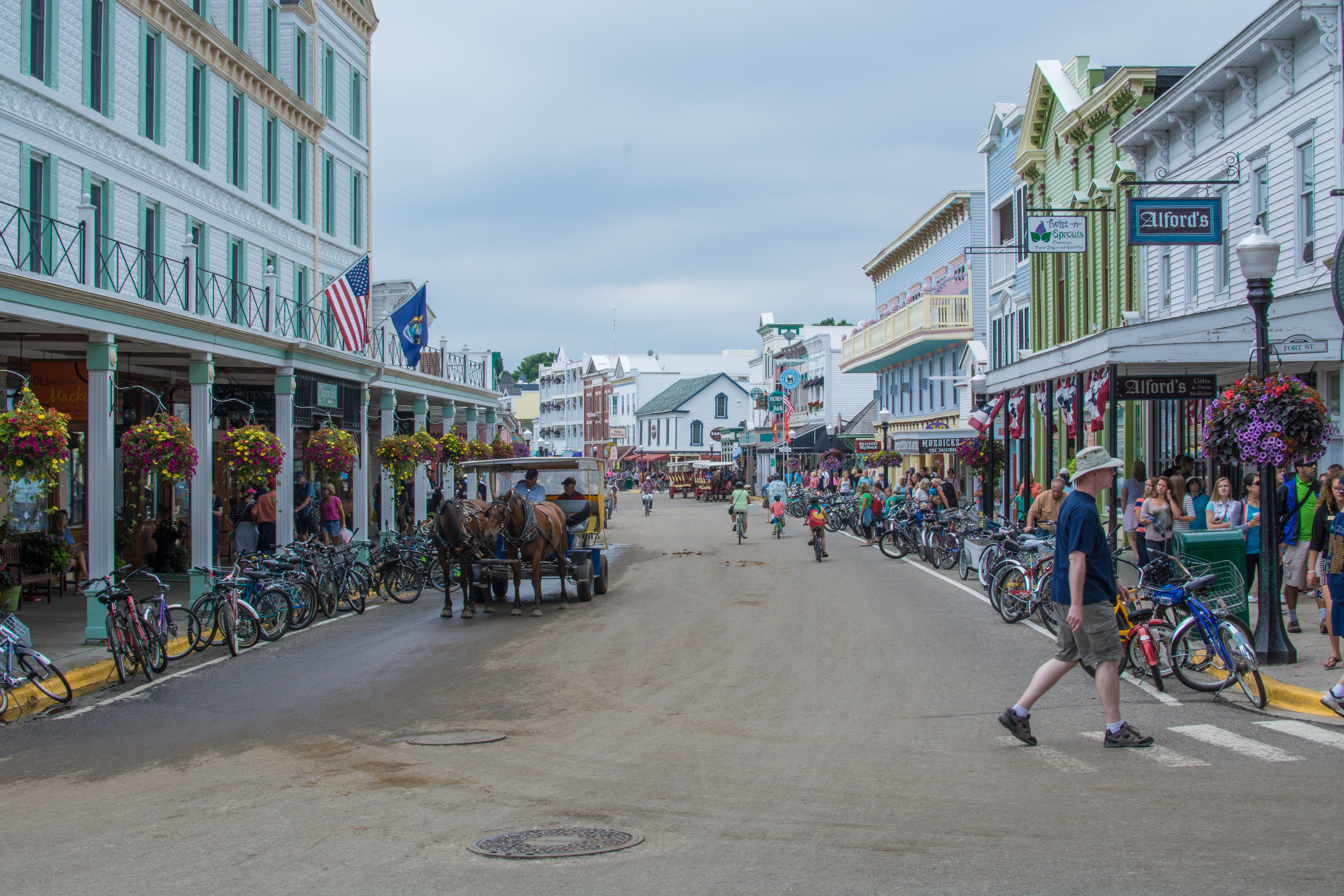
Mackinac Island, Michigan, USA

This is a list of car-free islands: islands inhabited by humans, in built environment settlements that are developed, which have legally restricted or eliminated vehicle traffic from their territories.

Country	Island
Australia	Cockatoo Island
Australia	Dangar Island
Australia	Hamilton Island
Australia	Rottnest Island
Bangladesh	St. Martin's Island
Belize	Caye Caulker
Bolivia	Isla del Sol
Brazil	Afuá
Brazil	Boipeba
Brazil	Costa da Lagoa
Brazil	Ilha do Algodoal
Brazil	Ilha do Cardoso
Brazil	Ilha de Cotijuba
Brazil	Ilha do Mel
Brazil	Ilha Grande
Brazil	Ilha de Tinharé
Brazil	Paquetá Island
Cambodia	Koh Rong Sanloem
Canada	Gaultois
Canada	Harrington Island
Canada	Toronto Islands (Ward's Island, Algonquin Island)
China	Gulangyu Island
Croatia	Koločep
Croatia	Kornat
Croatia	Lopud
Croatia	Prvić
Croatia	Silba
Croatia	Susak
Croatia	Sveti Klement
Croatia	Unije
Croatia	Zlarin
Denmark	Bjørnø
Denmark	Endelave
Denmark	Ertholmene (Christiansø, Frederiksø)
Denmark	Tunø
Faroe Islands	Mykines
Finland	Suomenlinna
France	Frioul archipelago (Pomègues, Ratonneau, If, Îlot Tiboulen)
France	Grande-Île
France	Houat
France	Hœdic
France	Île-d'Aix
France	Île de Batz
France	Île-de-Bréhat
France	Île Saint-Honorat
France	Île Sainte-Marguerite
France	Île de Sein
France	Molène
France	Porquerolles
France	Port-Cros
France	Quémènès
Germany	Baltrum
Germany	Frauenchiemsee
Germany	Gröde
Germany	Heligoland
Germany	Herreninsel
Germany	Hiddensee
Germany	Juist
Germany	Langeoog
Germany	Neuwerk
Germany	Spiekeroog
Germany	Wangerooge
Greece	Hydra
Greece	Spetses
Guernsey	Herm
Guernsey	Sark
Hong Kong, China	Cheung Chau, Crooked Island, Lamma Island, Peng Chau, Tap Mun, Yim Tin Tsai
Iceland	Flatey
Indonesia	Gili Islands (Gili Trawangan, Gili Meno, Gili Air)
Indonesia	Siberut
Italy	Alicudi
Italy	Isola dei Pescatori
Italy	Marettimo
Italy	Venetian Islands (Burano, Giudecca, Murano, Torcello)
Japan	Aoshima
Kenya	Lamu Island
Malawi	Chizumulu Island
Malaysia	Perhentian Islands (Perhentian Besar, Perhentian Kecil)
Malaysia	Tioman Island
Maldives	Ukulhas
Mexico	Isla Holbox
Nicaragua	Little Corn Island
Netherlands	Giethoorn
Netherlands	Schiermonnikoog
Netherlands	Vlieland
Norway	Borøya
Norway	Brønnøya
Norway	Fleinvær
Norway	Hernar
Norway	Røvær
Norway	Sandøya
Norway	Søndre Sandøy
Norway	Veierland
Norway	Ågerøya
Portugal	Culatra Island
Seychelles	La Digue
Sweden	Brännö
Sweden	Donsö
Sweden	Marstrand
Sweden	Styrsö
Sweden	Sydkoster
Sweden	Vrångö
Tanzania	Chole Island
Thailand	Ko Mak
Thailand	Ko Phayam
Thailand	Phi Phi Islands (Ko Phi Phi Don)
Turkey	Princes' Islands (Büyükada, Kınalıada, Burgazada, Heybeliada)
United Kingdom	Easdale
United Kingdom	Isles of Scilly (St Martin's, St Agnes, Tresco)
United Kingdom	Lundy
United Kingdom	Sark
United Kingdom	Shuna Island
United Kingdom	South Rona
United Kingdom	Tanera Mòr
United States	Bald Head Island
United States	Dewees Island
United States	Halibut Cove
United States	Mackinac Island
United States	Russell Island
United States	Tangier
United States	Fire Island

== See also ==
- Carfree city
- Car-free movement
- List of mainland settlements that are inaccessible by road
- Low Traffic Neighbourhood
- Autoluw (Literally "car-low", Dutch virtually car-free policies)
- Pedestrian zone
  - List of pedestrian zones – List of urban areas designed for human movement by walking
