= List of mainland settlements that are inaccessible by road =

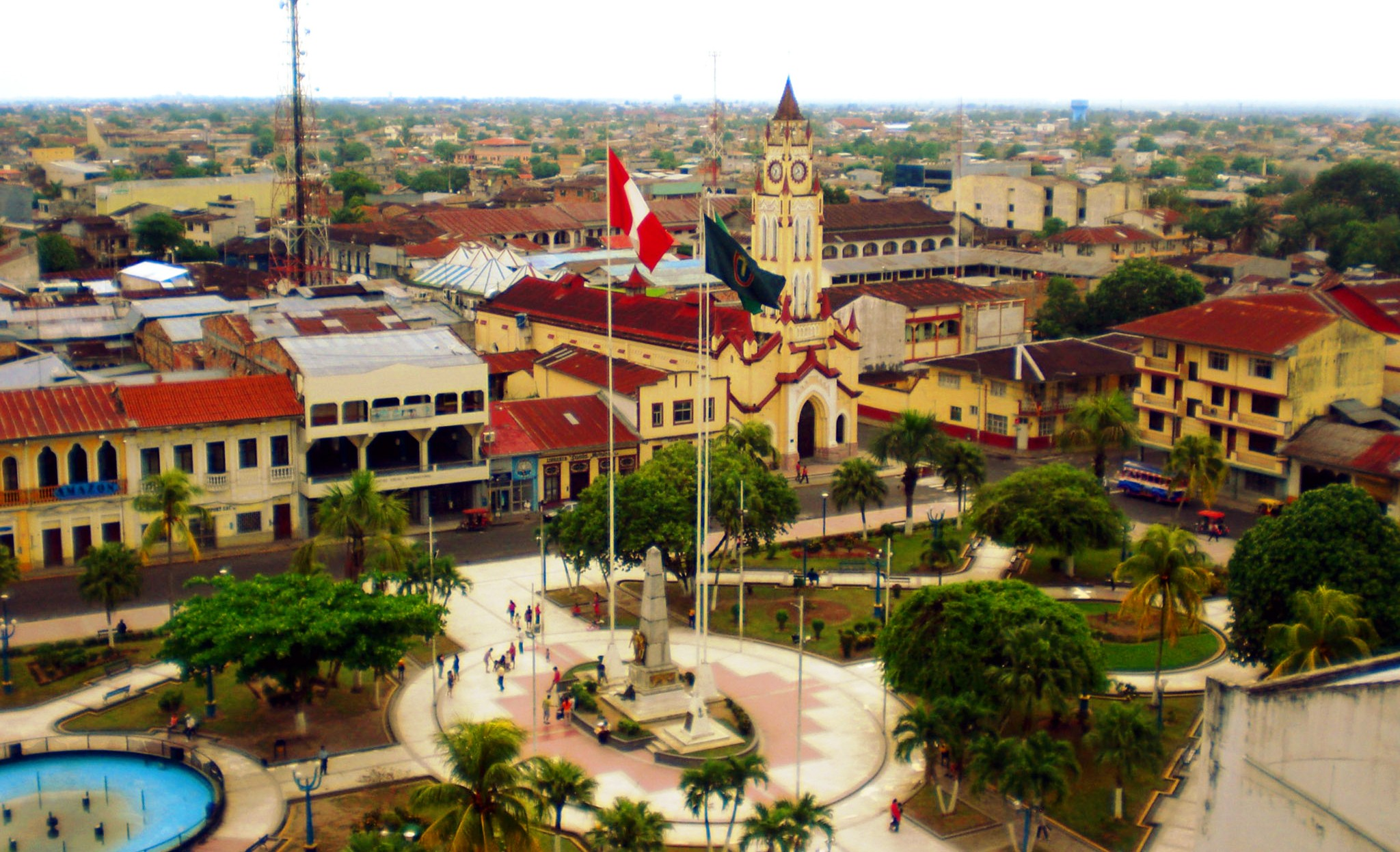
Iquitos, Peru, the largest mainland settlement in the world inaccessible by road

This is a list of notable mainland settlements that are inaccessible from the outside by automotive roads (roads built to carry civilian passenger motor vehicles). These settlements may have internal roads or paths but they lack roads connecting them to other places.

Many road-inaccessible settlements are on islands or are very remote from other settlements. The largest is Iquitos, Peru.

== Asia ==
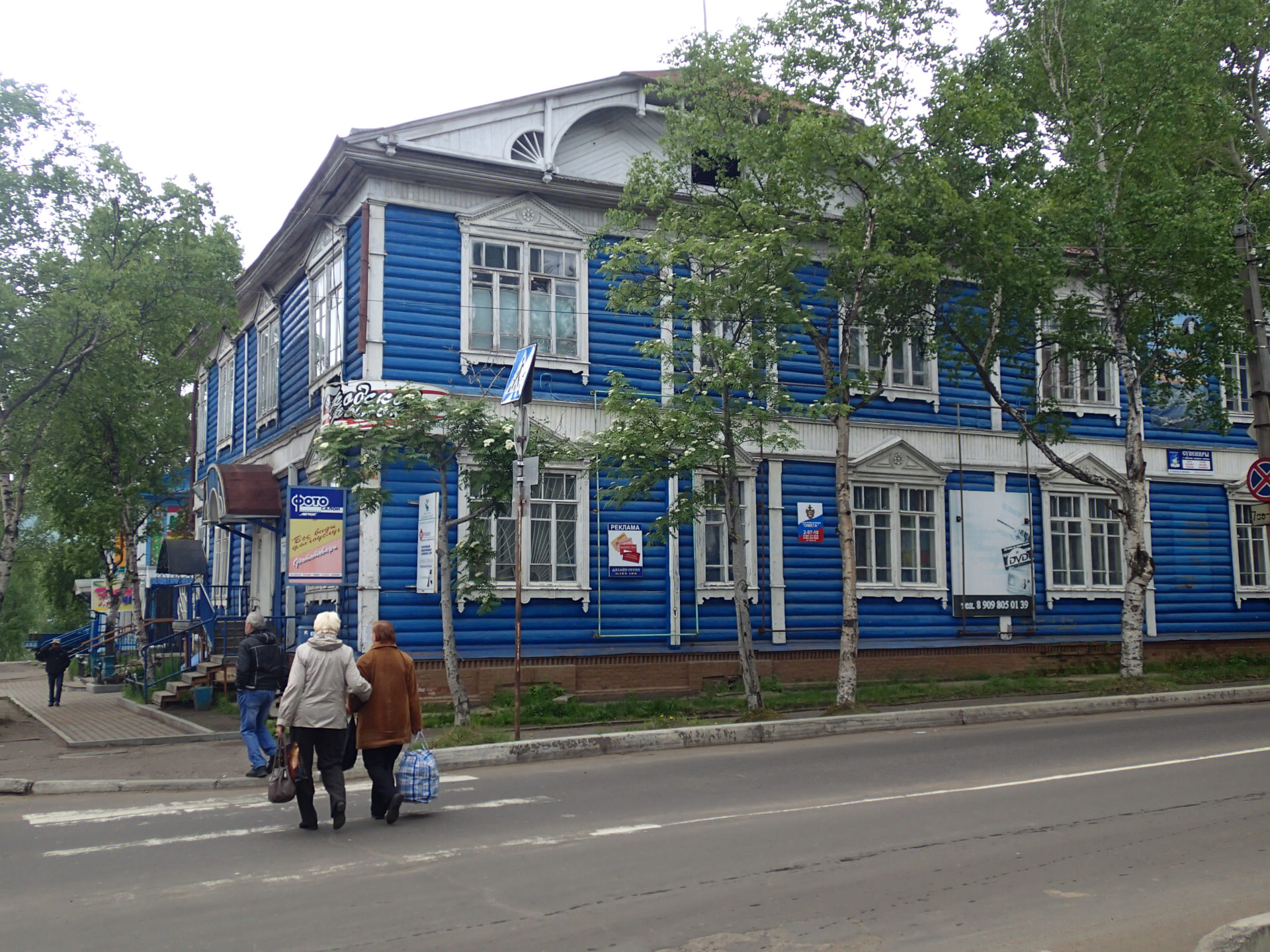
Nikolaevsk town centre

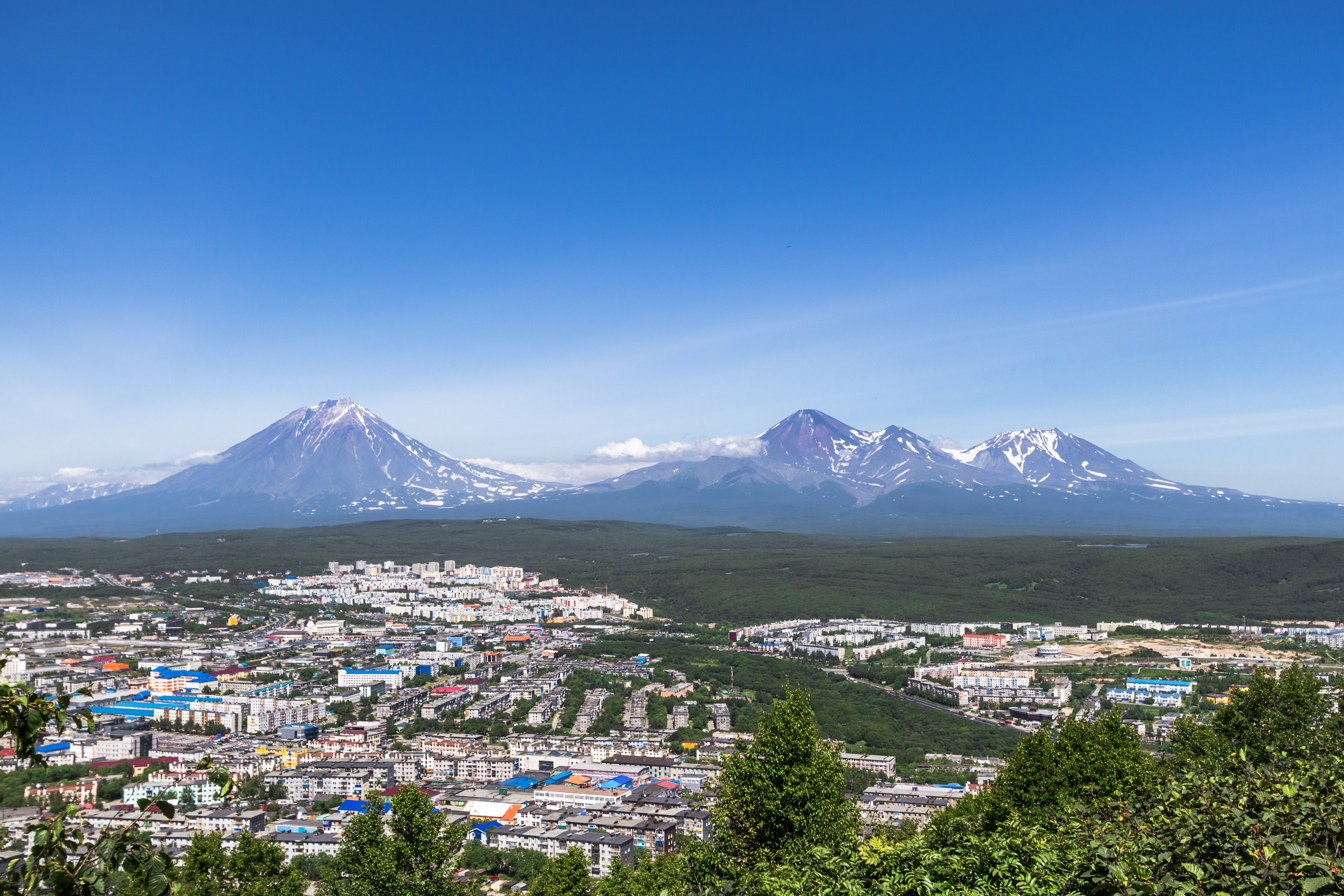
Petropavlovsk-Kamchatsky, Russia

- Andryushkino, Russia
- Anadyr, Russia
- Batagay, Russia
- Batagay-Alyta, Russia
- Belaya Gora, Russia
- Chersky, Russia
- Chokurdakh, Russia
- Egvekinot, Russia
- Khonuu, Russia
- Kyusyur, Russia
- Lavrentiya, Russia
- Nikolayevsk-on-Amur, Russia
- Norilsk, Russia
- Olenyok, Russia
- Olyokminsk, Russia
- Petropavlovsk-Kamchatsky, Russia
- Saskylakh, Russia
- Tiksi, Russia
- Uelen, Russia
- Zhigansk, Russia
- Zyryanka, Russia

== Europe ==
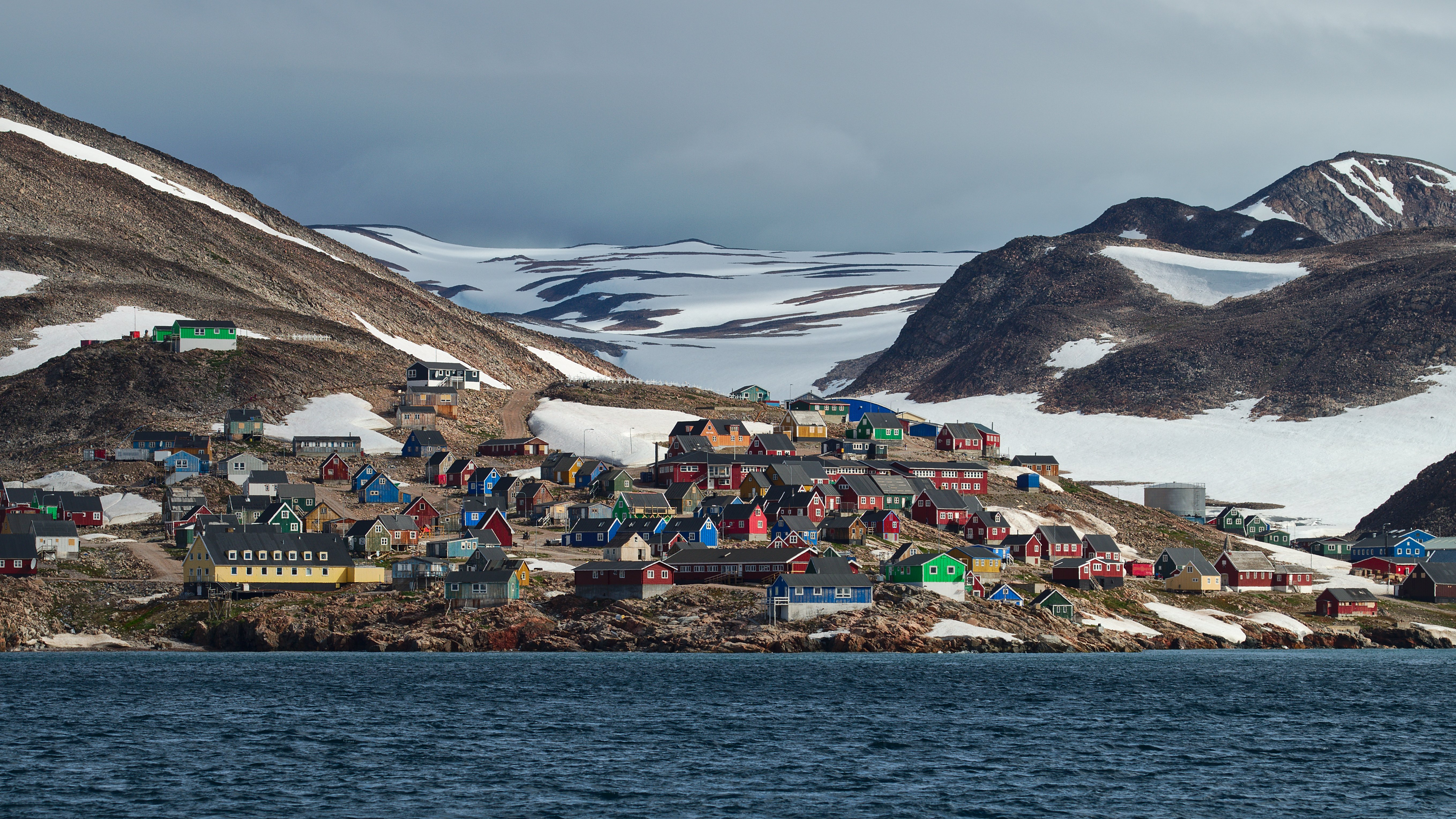
Ittoqqortoormiit, Greenland in 2018

- Cinque Terre, Italy
- Civita di Bagnoregio, Italy
- Chamois, Italy
- Finse, Norway
- Inverie, Scotland
- Ittoqqortoormiit, Greenland
- Scoraig and Carnach, Scotland (linked only to each other)
- Vorkuta, Russia
- Wengen, Switzerland
- Braunwald, Switzerland

== North America ==
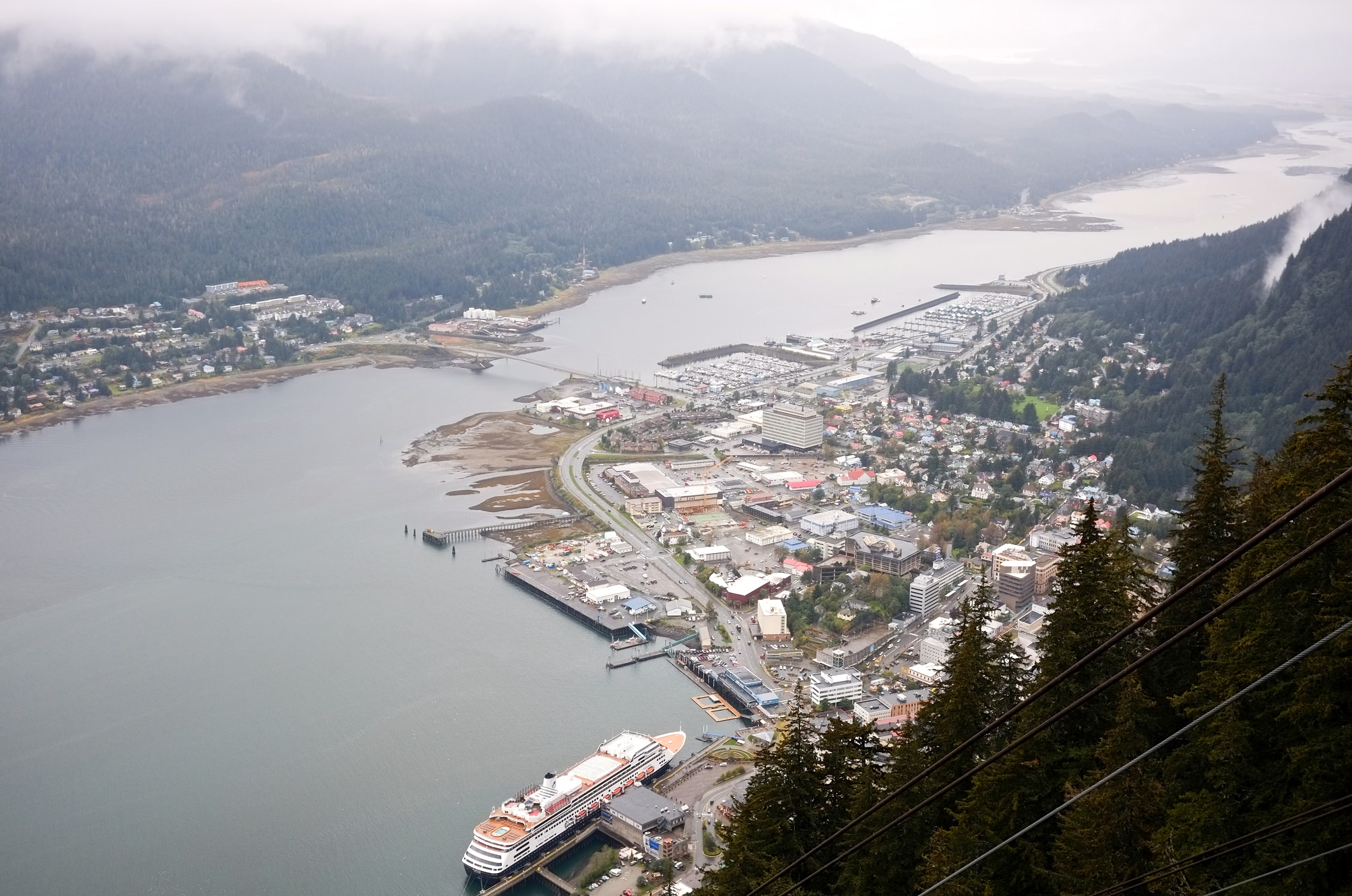
Juneau, Alaska

- Aklavik, Northwest Territories, Canada
- Arctic Village, Alaska, United States
- Arviat, Nunavut, Canada
- Attawapiskat, Ontario, Canada
- Baker Lake, Nunavut, Canada
- Bethel, Alaska, United States
- Bettles, Alaska, United States
- Chesterfield Inlet, Nunavut, Canada
- Churchill, Manitoba, Canada
- Colville Lake, Northwest Territories, Canada
- Cordova, Alaska, United States
- Deline, Northwest Territories, Canada
- Dillingham, Alaska, United States
- Fort Albany, Ontario, Canada
- Fort Severn, Ontario, Canada
- Gameti, Northwest Territories, Canada
- Gibsons, British Columbia, Canada
- Gustavus, Alaska, United States
- Halibut Cove, Alaska, United States
- Hartley Bay, British Columbia, Canada
- Inukjuak, Quebec, Canada
- Juneau, Alaska, United States
- King Salmon, Alaska, United States
- Koyukuk, Alaska, United States
- Kugaaruk, Nunavut, Canada
- Kugluktuk, Nunavut, Canada
- Kuujjuarapik, Quebec, Canada
- Kuujjuaq, Quebec, Canada
- Lac Brochet, Manitoba, Canada
- Livingston, Guatemala
- Lutselk'e, Northwest Territories, Canada
- Metlakatla, British Columbia, Canada
- Moosonee, Ontario, Canada
- Nahanni Butte, Northwest Territories, Canada
- Nain, Newfoundland and Labrador, Canada
- Neskantaga, Ontario, Canada
- Nome, Alaska, United States
- Ocean Falls, British Columbia, Canada
- Old Crow, Yukon, Canada
- Paulatuk, Northwest Territories, Canada
- Point Hope, Alaska, United States
- Port Simpson, British Columbia, Canada
- Powell River, British Columbia, Canada
- Pukatawagan, Manitoba, Canada
- Rankin Inlet, Nunavut, Canada
- Repulse Bay, Nunavut, Canada
- Sambaa K'e, Northwest Territories, Canada
- San Dionisio Pueblo Viejo, Mexico
- Schefferville, Quebec, Canada
- Sechelt, British Columbia, Canada
- Shamattawa, Manitoba, Canada
- Stehekin, Washington, United States
- St. Theresa Point, Manitoba, Canada
- Supai, Arizona in the Grand Canyon, United States
- Taloyoak, Nunavut, Canada
- Tête-à-la-Baleine, Quebec, Canada
- Tyonek, Alaska, United States
- Unalakleet, Alaska, United States
- Utqiaġvik, Alaska, United States
- Wales, Alaska, United States
- Wekweeti, Northwest Territories Canada
- Whale Cove, Nunavut, Canada
- Wunnumin Lake, Ontario, Canada
- Yakutat, Alaska, United States

== Oceania ==
- Bar Point, New South Wales, Australia
- Berowra Creek, New South Wales, Australia
- Coasters Retreat, New South Wales, Australia
- Currawong Beach, New South Wales, Australia
- Elvina Bay, New South Wales, Australia
- Fishermans Point, New South Wales, Australia
- Great Mackerel Beach, New South Wales, Australia
- Little Wobby, New South Wales, Australia
- Lovett Bay, New South Wales, Australia
- McCarrs Creek, New South Wales, Australia
- Melaleuca, Tasmania, Australia
- Milsons Passage, New South Wales, Australia
- Morning Bay, New South Wales, Australia
- Teewah, Queensland, Australia (only accessible via offroad driving on a beach)
- Tufi, Oro, Papua New Guinea
- Wondabyne, New South Wales, Australia

== South America ==
- Guapi, Cauca, Colombia
- Inírida, Guainía, Colombia
- Iquitos, Loreto, Peru
- Leticia, Amazonas, Colombia
- Mitú, Vaupés, Colombia
- Melinka, Los Lagos Region, Chile
- Puerto Leguízamo, Putumayo, Colombia
- Puerto Williams, Magallanes Region, Chile

== See also ==
- List of car-free islands
- Monastery
