= Ko Phayam =

- island
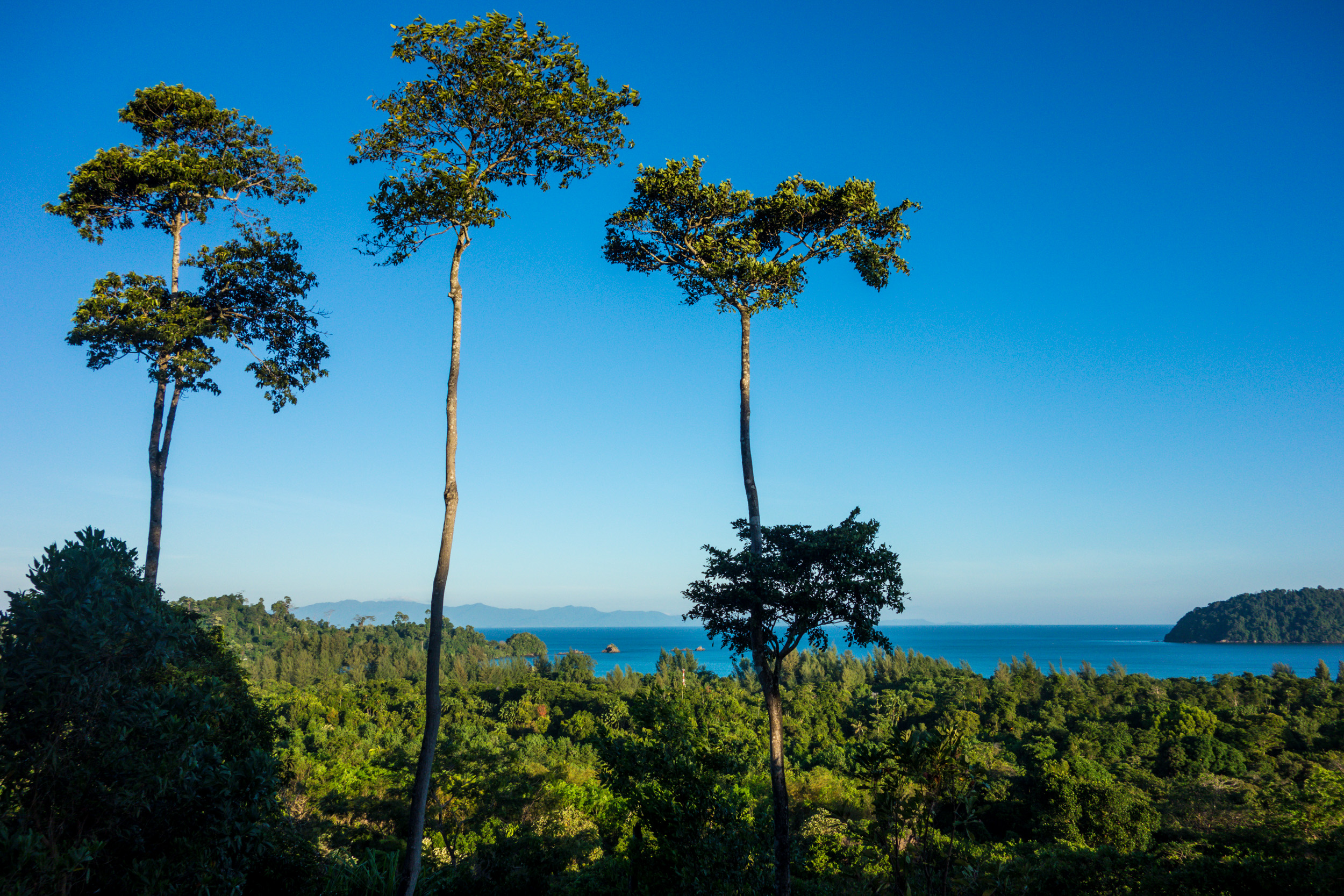
- Interactive map of Ko Phayam
- Coordinates: 9°44′N 98°24′E
- Country: Thailand
- Province: Ranong

Population (2012)
  - Total: 350
- Time zone: UTC+7 (THA)
- Postal code: 85000

Ko Phayam (Thai: เกาะพยาม) is a small island in the Andaman Sea, located off the coast of southwestern Thailand near the border with Myanmar. With a land area of about 2.23 square kilometers and a maximum length of 8 kilometers.

== Geography and environment ==
Ko Phayam is a green island covered in coconut and cashew plantations, with a central hilly region and sandy beaches fringing its coastline. The island is part of the Mu Ko Phayam National Park, established in 2003 to protect its natural ecosystems. The park encompasses not only Ko Phayam but also nearby islets and surrounding coral reefs.
