= Grading (earthworks) =

In civil engineering, creating a profile

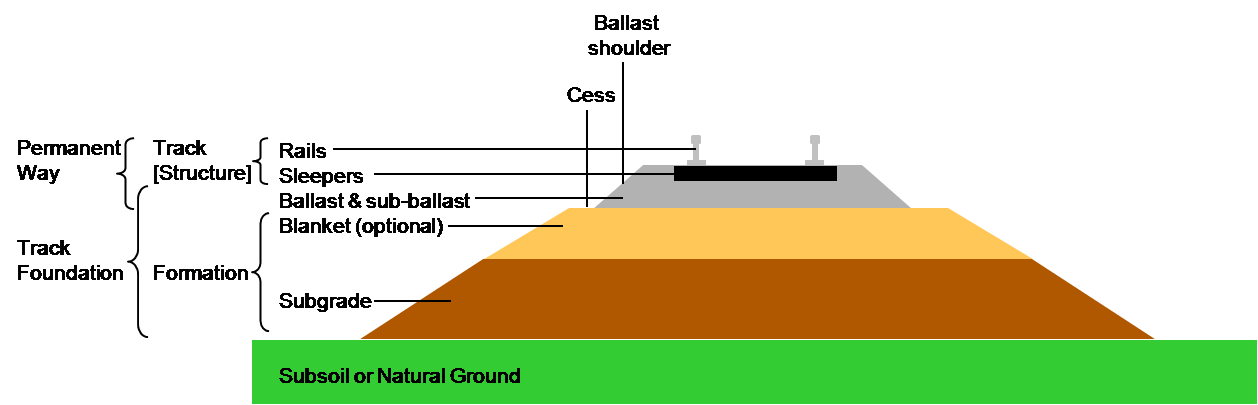
Section through railway track and foundation showing the sub-grade

In civil engineering and landscape architectural construction, grading is the work of ensuring a level base, or one with a specified slope, for a construction work such as a foundation, the base course for a road or a railway, or landscape and garden improvements, or surface drainage. The earthworks created for such a purpose are often called the sub-grade or finished contouring (see diagram).

== Regrading ==
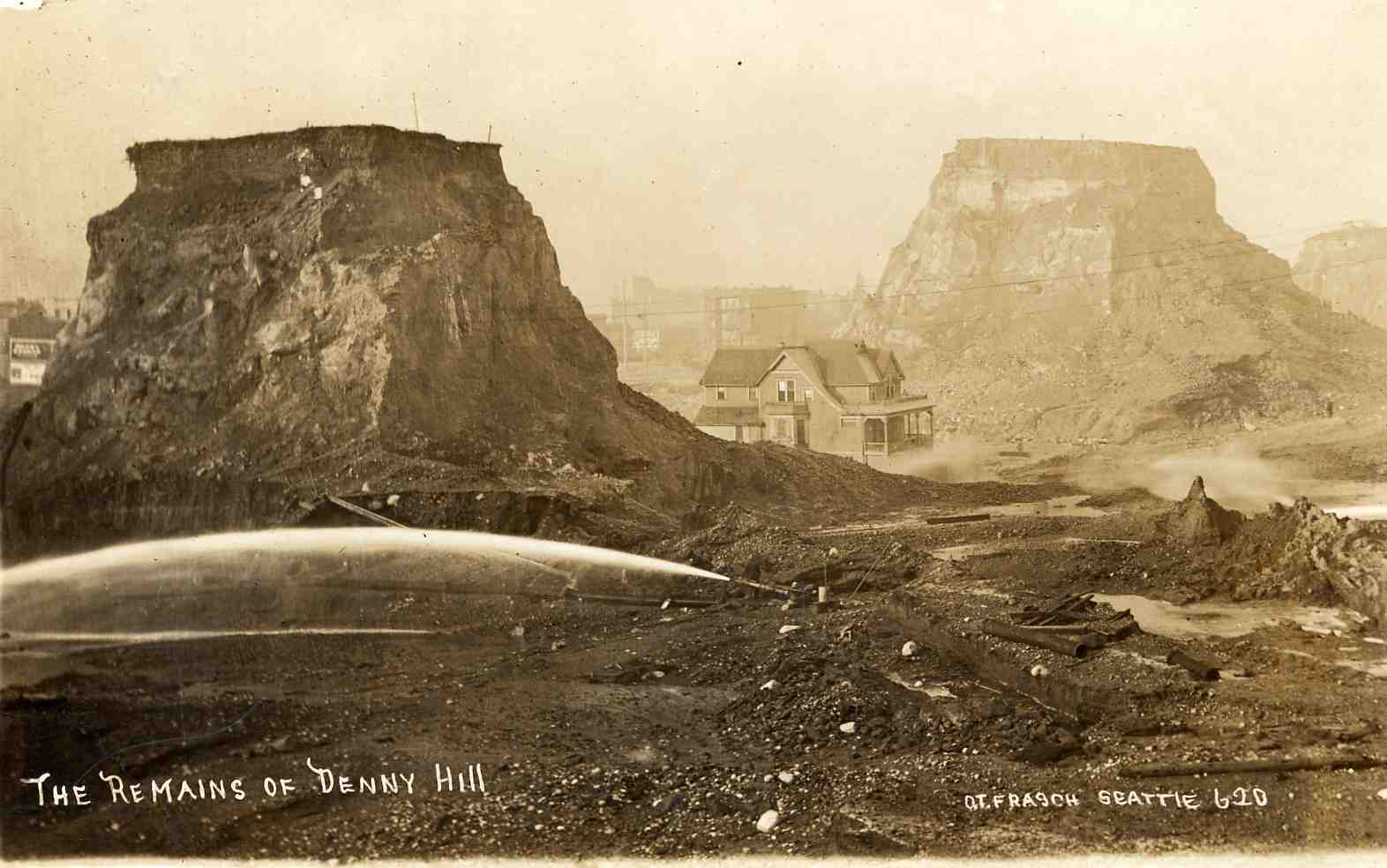
The Denny Regrade in process, Seattle, Washington (1900s)

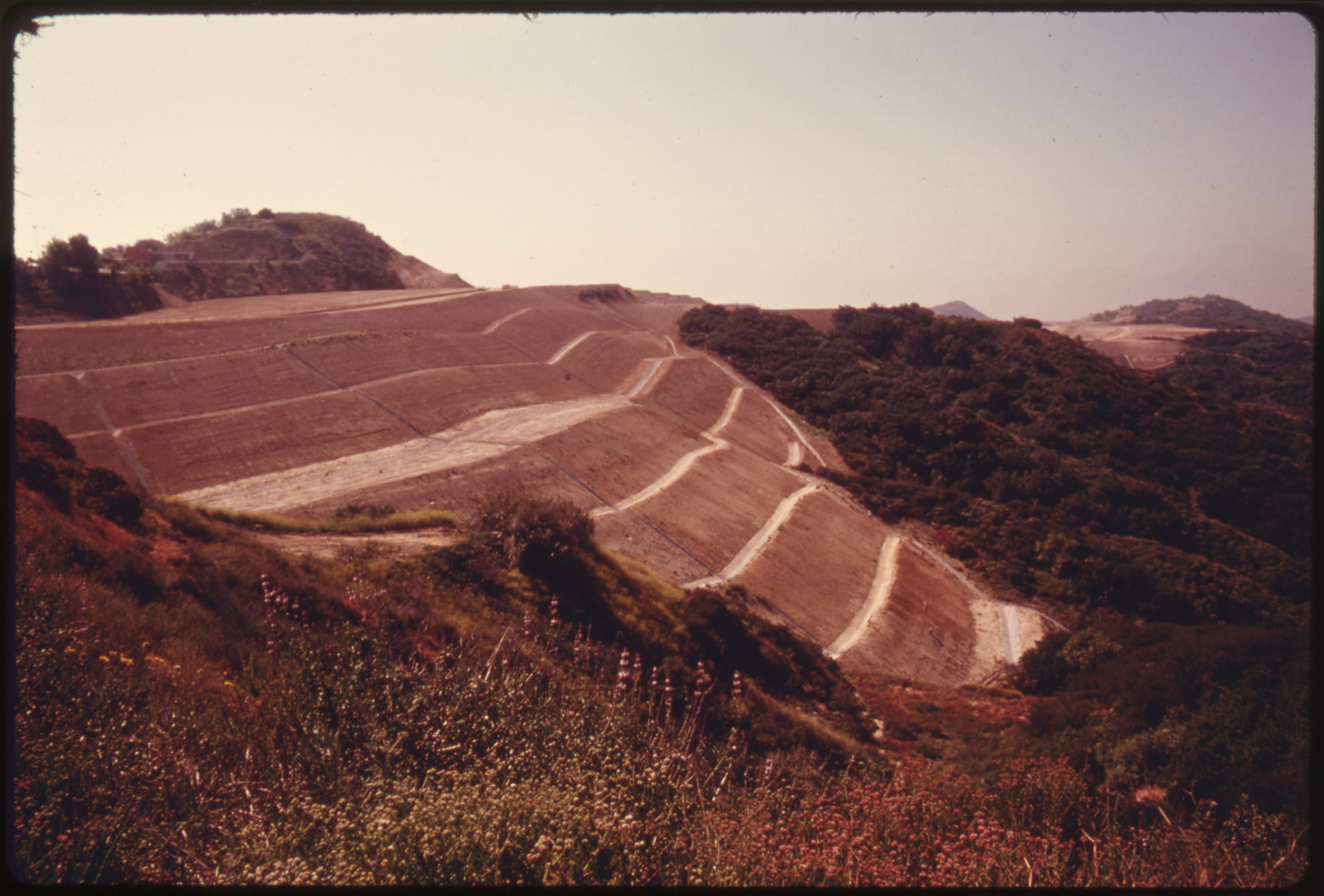
Regrading for a subdivision in the Santa Monica Mountains, Los Angeles, California (1970s)

Regrading is the process of grading for raising and/or lowering the levels of land. Such a project can also be referred to as a regrade.

Regrading may be done on a small scale (as in preparation of a house site) or on quite a large scale (as in major reconfiguration of the terrain of a city, such as the Denny Regrade in Seattle).

Regrading is typically performed to make land more level (flatter), in which case it is sometimes called levelling.) Levelling can have the consequence of making other nearby slopes steeper, and potentially unstable or prone to erosion.

== Transportation ==
In the case of gravel roads and earthworks for certain purposes, grading forms not just the base but the cover and surface of the finished construction, and is often called finished grade.

== Process ==
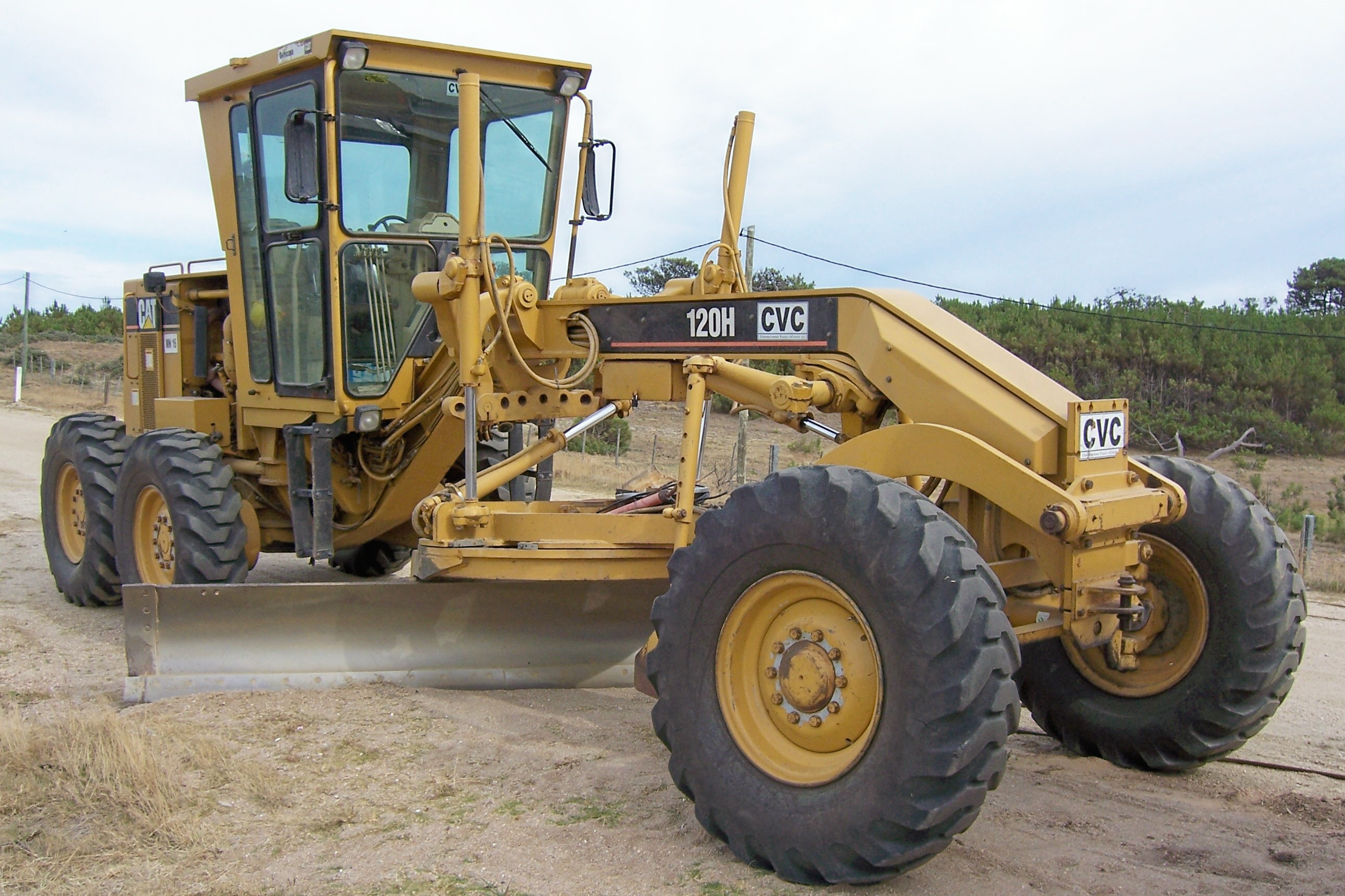
Modern road grader

After the existing conditions of the limit of work has been surveyed, surveyors will set stakes in places that are to be regraded. These stakes have marks on them that either give a finished grade to the design of the project, or have CUT/FILL marks which specify how much dirt is to be added or subtracted. All grade marks are relative to site benchmarks that have been established. The regrading work is then often done using heavy machinery like bulldozers and excavators to roughly prepare an area, then a grader is used for a finer finish.

== Environmental design ==
In the environmental design professions, grading and regrading are a specifications and construction component in landscape design, landscape architecture, and architecture projects. It is used for buildings or outdoor amenities regarding foundations and footings, slope terracing and stabilizing, aesthetic contouring, and directing surface runoff drainage of stormwater and domestic/irrigation runoff flows.

== Purposes ==
Reasons for regrading include:

- Enabling construction on lands that were previously too varied and/or steeply sloped.
- Enabling transportation along routes that were previously too varied and/or steep.
- Changing drainage patterns and rerouting surface flow.
- Improving the stability of terrain adjacent to developments.

== Consequences ==
Potential problems and consequences from regrading include:

- Soil and/or slope instability
- Terrain prone to erosion
- Ecological impacts, habitat destruction, terrestrial and/or aquatic biological losses.
- Drainage problems (surface and/or subsurface flow) for areas not considered in the regrading plan.
- Loss of aesthetic natural landscape topography and/or historical cultural landscapes.

== See also ==
- Cut (earthmoving)
- Cut-and-cover
- Cut and fill
- Fill dirt
- Grade (slope) (civil engineering and geographical term)
- Land development
- Slope (mathematical term)
- Subgrade
- Trench
