= School of Transportation Science and Engineering, HIT =

- Type: public research school
- Established: 1995
- Parent institution: Harbin Institute of Technology
- Dean: Tan Yiqiu(谭忆秋)
- Academic staff: 98
- Undergraduates: 500
- Postgraduates: 178
- Doctoral students: 66
- Location: Harbin, Heilongjiang, China
- Website: jtxy.hit.edu.cn/main.htm

School of Transportation Science and Engineering, Harbin Institute of Technology (Chinese: 哈尔滨工业大学交通科学与工程学院) is one of nineteen schools of Harbin Institute of Technology, and the only school of transportation engineering within C9 League (an alliance of the top nine universities in China). The school was founded in 1995. With years of development, its quality of science research and student education have reached top-ranking level and it has been conferred as one of the most important training bases of civil engineering and transportation engineers by the nation.

== History ==
School of Transportation Science and Engineering, Harbin Institute of Technology traces its origin back to the railway construction program of the Sino-Russian Industrial School, which was the precursor of Harbin Institute of Technology. In 1958, highway and urban road major was established by Professor N.S. Cai. In 1979, the school received qualification of enrolling graduates in majors of road and bridge. In 1986, the transportation engineering major was established and began to enroll graduate students. Seven years later, School of Transportation Science and Engineering began to enroll Undergraduate.

In 1995, the School was founded with HIT's merge with Harbin University of Architecture. In 1998, the majors of road and bridge were both conferred with the qualification to enroll Doctorate. In 2000, School of Transportation Science and Engineering was incorporated into Harbin Institute of Technology as Harbin University of Architecture was incorporated as the 2nd campus of HIT. In 2009, the Transportation Information and Control Engineering major was established.

== Departments ==
Ever since 1958, the school has established five departments and one engineering center, namely Dept. of Road and Railway Engineering, Dept. of Bridge & Tunnel Engineering, Dept. of Transportation Engineering, Dept. of Road Materials Engineering, Dept. of Traffic Information & Control Engineering and the Measurement Center. It also owns a state key lab on urban road and traffic field and a provincial key lab on ITS (Intelligent Traffic System).

Road and railway engineering has been assigned as key discipline by both Heilongjiang Province and the Ministry of Housing and Urban-Rural Development. Transportation planning, Engineering management and Bridge and tunnel engineering are listed as key discipline of the Ministry of Housing and Urban-Rural Development.

== Achievements ==
Since its foundation, the school has promoted many advanced researches in the technology of Highway engineering, Highway construction and observing road & bridge, mechanical analysis and simulation, transportation issues and their effects and solutions, materials for pavement and bridges, and applications of intelligent transportation system.

== Communication ==
The School of Transportation Science and Engineering has various inter-school and international communications, having student exchange programs with Imperial College London, University of Illinois at Urbana–Champaign and Moscow Automobile and Road Construction State Technical University (MADI). The school also has about 20 part-time Adjunct professor. It has held two high-level international conferences and participated in 66 high-level international conferences.
