= Wearing course =

Upper layer in roadway, airfield, and dockyard construction

The wearing course, also known as a wearing surface, friction course, or surface course, is the upper layer in roadway, airfield, and dockyard construction. The term 'surface course' is sometimes used slightly different, to describe very thin surface layers such as chip seal. In rigid pavements the upper layer is a portland cement concrete slab. In flexible pavements, the upper layer consists of asphalt concrete, that is a construction aggregate with a bituminous binder. The wearing course is typically placed on the binder course which is then laid on the base course, which is normally placed on the subbase, which rests on the subgrade. There are various different types of flexible pavement wearing course, suitable for different situations.

Stone mastic asphalt is a type of flexible pavement wearing course which is typically used for heavily trafficked roads.

== See also ==
- Highway engineering
- Road construction
- Road surface
