= Gravel road =

Type of unpaved road surfaced with gravel

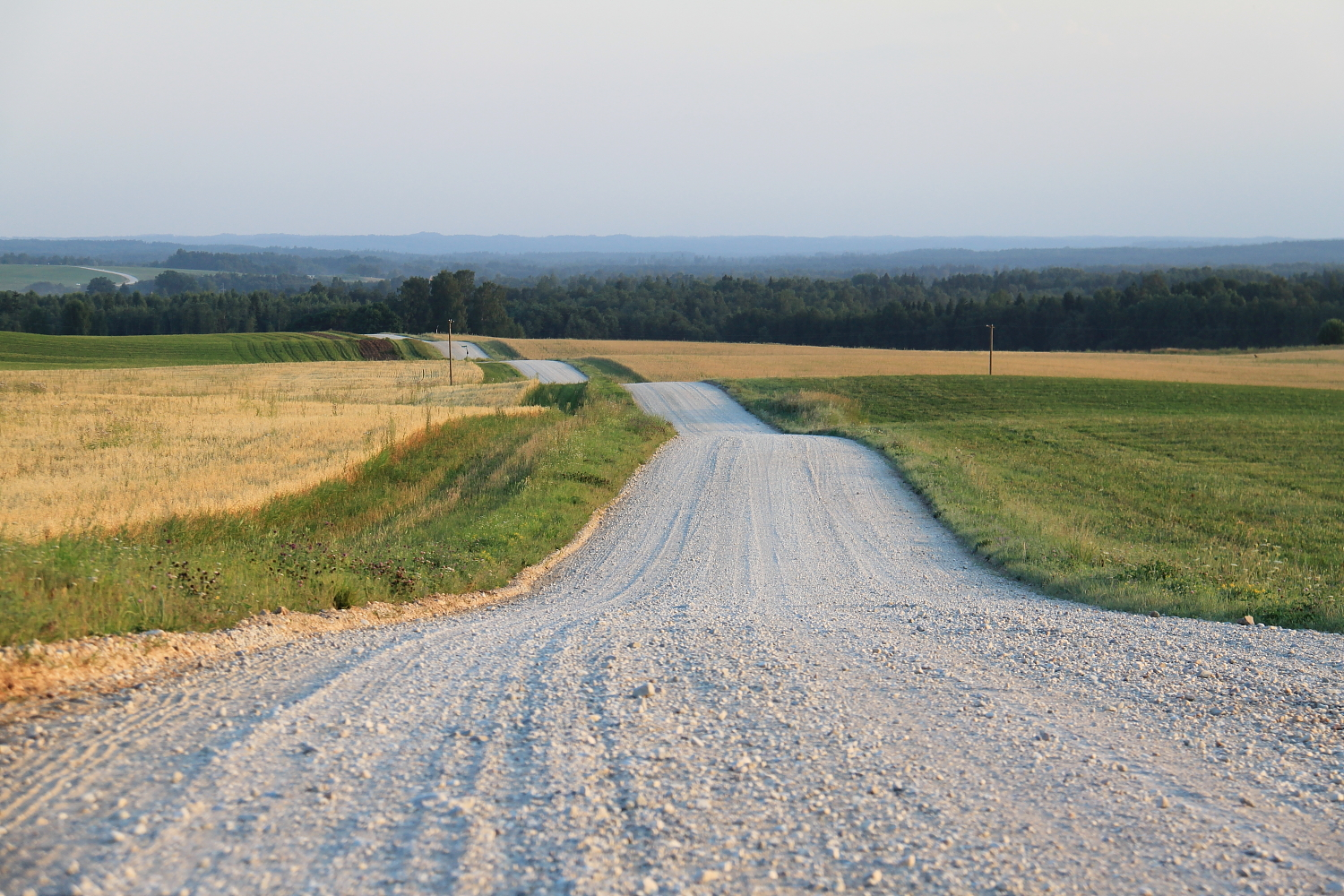
A gravel road in Estonia

A gravel road is a type of unpaved road surfaced with gravel that has been brought to the site from a quarry or stream bed. Gravel roads are common in less-developed nations, and also in the rural areas of developed nations such as Canada and the United States. In New Zealand, and other Commonwealth countries, they may be known as metal roads. They may be referred to as "dirt roads" in common speech, but that term is used more for unimproved roads with no surface material added. If well constructed and maintained, a gravel road is an all-weather road.

== Characteristics ==
=== Construction ===
Compared to sealed roads, which require large machinery to work and pour concrete or to lay and smooth a bitumen-based surface, gravel roads are easy and cheap to build. However, compared to dirt roads, all-weather gravel highways are quite expensive to build, as they require front loaders, dump trucks, graders, and roadrollers to provide a base course of compacted earth or other material, sometimes macadamised, covered with one or more different layers of gravel. Graders are used to "blade" the road's surface (pass frequently to mix and distribute the gravel) to produce a more extreme camber compared to a paved road to aid drainage, to produce an A-shaped surface to the road called a "crown", as well as to construct drainage ditches and embankments in low-lying areas. Cellular confinement systems can be used to prevent the washboarding effect.

Construction of a gravel road begins with the base or subgrade layer. The expected road traffic volume and the average daily truck passage must be considered during the design process as they will influence the thickness of this layer, along with the balances of gravel and fines. Geotextile fabric may be laid to improve the stability of the subgrade layer. When geotextile fabric is used, a gravel layer with a minimum thickness of 6 in (15 cm) is suggested to ensure the fabric remains unexposed. Road construction guidelines suggest that the crown in the road surface begins at the center point in the road, and does not exceed a 4% gradation from the center to the edge of the roadway.

The surface layer is constructed atop the subgrade layer. The amount of precipitation is taken into consideration for the selection of gravel size distribution. The surface layer will follow the crown established by the subgrade layer. Scarification of the subgrade layer prior to application of the surface gravel layer can be performed to increase the mixing and adherence between layers. Construction of the road surface is done gradually through multiple applications of layers of gravel, with compaction prior to the addition of the following layer. During reparation of a damaged road, ensuring that any washboarding, rutting, potholes, and erosion is adequately removed will minimize future need for reparation. Windrowing can be performed along the edges of roads in dry climates to allow easy access to gravel material for small repairs.

=== Materials ===
The gravel used consists of varying amount of crushed stone, sand, and fines. Fines are silt or clay particles smaller than .075 millimetres (0.0030 in), which can act as a binder. Crushed stone, also called road metal, is used because gravel with fractured faces will stay in place better than rounded river pebbles. A good gravel for a gravel road will have a higher percentage of fines than gravel used as a subbase for a paved road. This often causes problems if a gravel road is paved without adding sand and gravel sized stone to dilute the percentage of fines.

A gravel road is quite different from a 'gravel drive', popular as private driveways in the United Kingdom. This uses clean gravel consisting of uniform, rounded stones and small pebbles.

==== Laterite and murram roads ====
In Africa and parts of Asia and South America, laterite soils are used to build dirt roads. However laterite, called murram in East Africa, varies considerably in the proportion of stones (which are usually very small) to earth and sand. It ranges from a hard gravel to a softer earth embedded with small stones. Not all laterite and murram roads are therefore strictly gravel roads. Laterite and murram which contains a significant proportion of clay becomes very slippery when wet, and in the rainy season, it may be difficult even for four-wheel drive vehicles to avoid slipping off very cambered roads into the drainage ditches at the side of the road. As it dries out, such laterite can become very hard, like sun-dried bricks. Freshly compacted natural laterite soil is weak for road building: soaked California Bearing Ratio is usually only 5 to 15, barely enough for a subgrade. When the same material is dug out as coarse gravel with hard iron nodules instead, that number jumps to 30 to 90, similar to a normal road base. Judged by traditional base-course specifications, many laterites would be rejected, since their plasticity index is often 15 to 20 and their soaked CBR falls below the usual minimum of 80. Countries including Botswana, Kenya, Malawi and Zimbabwe have nonetheless used untreated laterite in the base and subbase of both low- and high-volume roads with good results.

=== Maintenance ===
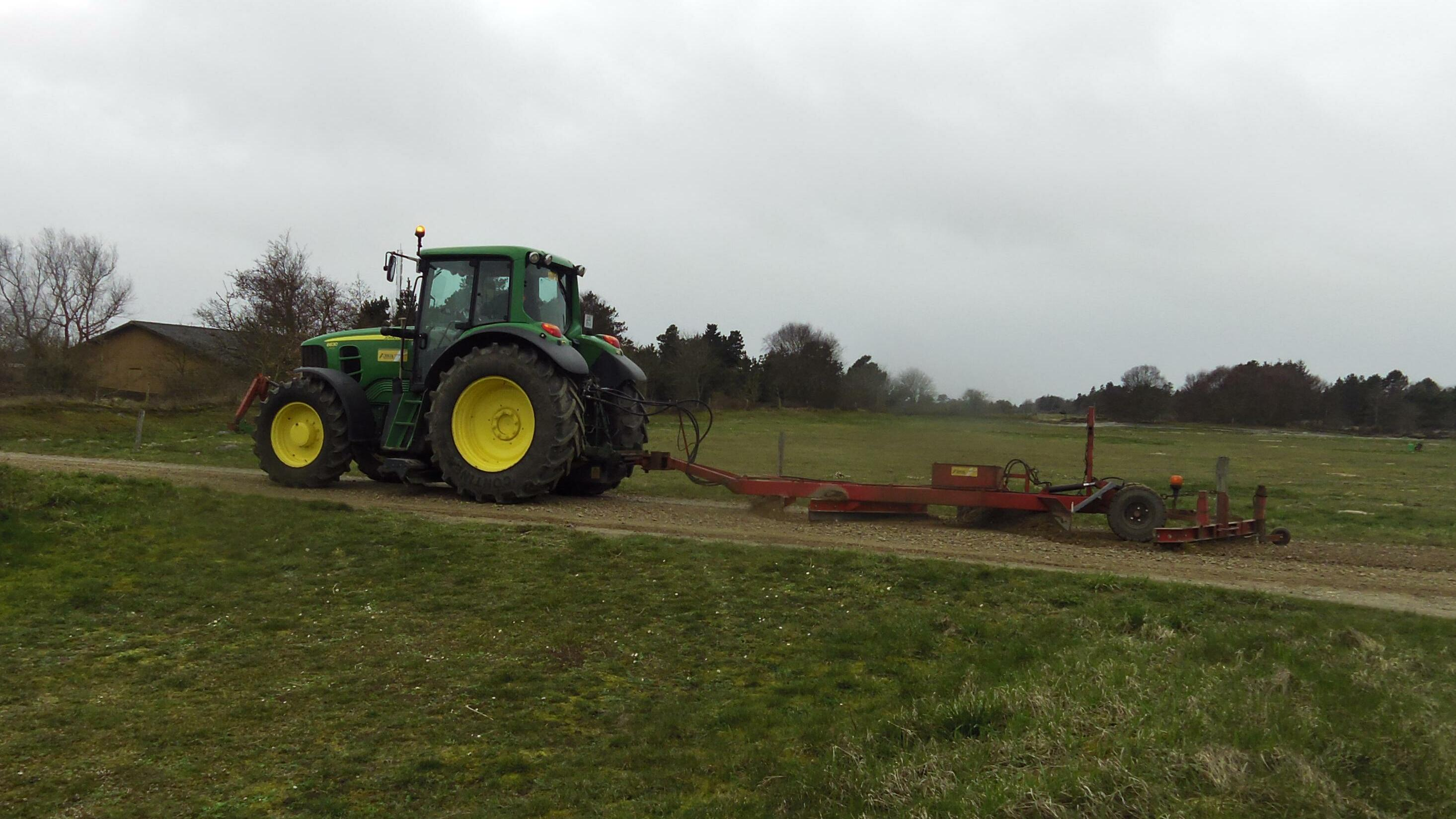
Maintenance of a gravel road in Denmark

Gravel roads require much more frequent maintenance than paved roads, especially after wet periods and when accommodating increased traffic. Wheel motion shoves material to the outside (as well as in-between travelled lanes), leading to rutting, reduced water-runoff, and eventual road destruction if unchecked. As long as the process is interrupted early enough, simple re-grading is sufficient, with material being pushed back into shape.

Segments of gravel roads on grades also rut easily as a result of flowing water. When grading or building the road, waterbars are used to direct water off the road. As an alternative method, humps can be formed in the gravel along the road to impede water flow, thereby reducing rutting.

Another problem with gravel roads is washboarding — the formation of corrugations across the surface at right angles to the direction of travel. Narrow-spaced washboarding can develop on gravel roads due to inconsistent moisture levels in the gravel, poor quality gravel, and vehicular stress to the road. Washboarding can also occur when graders exceed recommended speeds during the construction or maintenance phase causing the blade to bounce on the surface creating a pattern of widely spaced corrugations. Corrugations from washboarding can become severe enough to cause vibration in vehicles so that bolts loosen or cracks form in components. Proper grading is needed to remove the corrugations, and reconstruction with careful choice of good quality gravel can help prevent them reforming. Additionally, installing a cellular confinement system will prevent the washboard-like corrugations from occurring.

Gravel roads are often found in cold climates because they are less vulnerable to freeze / thaw damage than asphalt roads. The inferior surface of gravel is not an issue if the road is covered by snow and ice for extended periods.

==== Dust control ====
Dust control is routine practice on gravel roads in order to reduce the need for frequent maintenance, mitigate health concerns, and to prevent dust-related damage to roadside vegetation. Some common dust-suppression techniques are the application of a chloride solution (calcium chloride, magnesium chloride, sodium chloride), the application of a resin compound, or the incorporation of natural clay into the gravel mixture during the construction phase.

===== Calcium chloride as a dust suppressant =====
Calcium chloride provides dust suppression through its hygroscopic properties, allowing moisture to be drawn in and retained by the compound. Calcium chloride can be applied in either dry (pellet or flake) or wet (dissolved pre-prepared solution) form. Successful applications can be effective for up to three years, depending on the weather and traffic conditions for the roadway.

Dry application of this type of dust suppressant is begun by first preparing the road surface through grader passes, moving the top 5–8 cm of gravel creating windrows on the edges of the road. Calcium chloride is then applied to the road surface, and the road is then sprayed with water until the compound is dissolved. A grader "blades" the surface in numerous passes to ensure a uniform distribution of the compound. Compaction and the forming of the road surface is then performed to finalize the process.

Wet application begins by spraying the road surface with a 30% concentration solution of calcium chloride. After the solution is applied, the top 5–8 cm of gravel is mixed through numerous passes of a grader. The road is then formed and compacted.

== See also ==
- Country lane
- Dirt road
- Erosion
- Forest Highway
- Forest railway
- Forest road
- Logging
- Roads
- Road surface
- Track bed
- Trail
