= Pavement engineering =

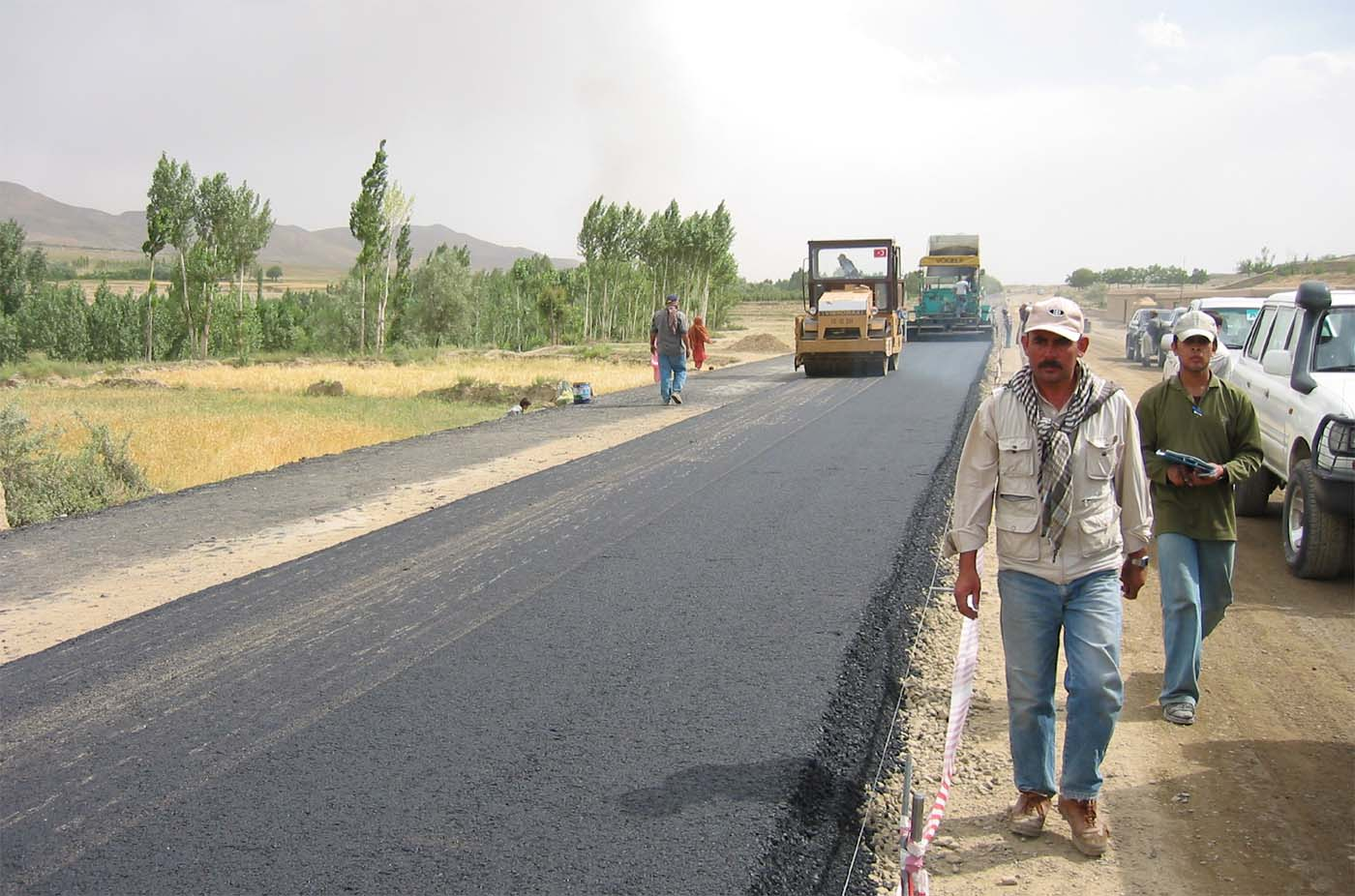

Pavement engineering is a branch of civil engineering that uses engineering techniques to design and maintain flexible (asphalt) and rigid (concrete) pavements. This includes streets and highways and involves knowledge of soils, hydraulics, and material properties. Pavement engineering involves new construction as well as rehabilitation and maintenance of existing pavements.

Maintenance often involves using engineering judgment to make maintenance repairs with the highest long-term benefit and lowest cost. The Pavement Condition Index (PCI) is an example of an engineering approach applied to existing pavements. Another example is the use of a falling weight deflectometer (FWD) to non-destructively test existing pavements. Calculation of pavement layer strengths can be performed from the resulting deflection data. The two methods - empirical or mechanistic is used to determine pavement layer thicknesses.

Pavement design and analysis rely heavily on understanding the mechanical behavior of pavement materials through various testing methods.

Modern pavement engineering increasingly integrates field-based data and mechanistic modelling to improve the accuracy of design and performance predictions. Lightweight deflectometer (LWD) measurements have been used to optimize geotechnical input parameters for pavement design, enabling better representation of in situ material conditions compared to traditional laboratory-based assumptions.

In addition, modelling approaches based on repeated loading data have been developed to predict permanent strain behaviour in subgrade soils and unbound layers. These approaches contribute to improved mechanistic–empirical pavement design by linking field measurements with long-term deformation performance under traffic loading.

== Material characterization and testing methods ==
In pavement engineering, the mechanical behavior of pavement materials is evaluated using a combination of laboratory testing, field testing, and full-scale experimental methods. Laboratory tests such as repeated load triaxial (RLT) testing are commonly used to determine resilient modulus and permanent deformation characteristics of soils and unbound materials under controlled conditions. Empirical tests such as the California bearing ratio (CBR) have also been widely used for subgrade characterization.

In addition to laboratory and empirical approaches, full-scale accelerated pavement testing methods, such as heavy vehicle simulators (HVS), are used to study pavement performance under controlled but realistic loading conditions. These systems simulate repeated wheel loads on full-scale pavement sections, allowing researchers to evaluate structural behavior, including rutting, cracking, and long-term performance, within a compressed time period.

Field-based non-destructive testing (NDT) methods provide an efficient alternative for in situ evaluation of pavement layers. Devices such as the falling weight deflectometer (FWD) and lightweight deflectometer (LWD) are commonly used to estimate material stiffness and structural capacity without disturbing the pavement structure.

Among these methods, the lightweight deflectometer (LWD) has gained increasing attention due to its portability and ability to provide rapid assessment of unbound layers. LWD measurements have been shown to correlate with laboratory-derived parameters such as resilient modulus, enabling estimation of material stiffness directly in the field.

== Evaluation of pavement ==
The evaluation of existing road pavements is done based on 3 factors

- Functional surface condition: where all the distresses such as cracks, potholes, rutting and others are analyzed.
- Structural condition: which analyzes pavement's structural strength to take loading from trucks.
- Roughness: using parameters such as the International Roughness Index to evaluate comfort for drivers.

== Sustainable pavement materials and recycling ==
Material innovation plays a key role in pavement engineering, particularly in improving sustainability and long-term performance. The use of industrial and construction waste materials in pavement layers has been investigated as a means of reducing environmental impact while maintaining or enhancing mechanical properties.

Experimental studies using accelerated and full-scale testing methods have demonstrated that asphalt mixtures incorporating by-product aggregates can achieve satisfactory performance under repeated heavy traffic loading.

Similarly, laboratory and simulation-based studies, including the use of circular road simulators, have been employed to evaluate the behaviour of asphalt mixtures containing industrial by-products under controlled loading conditions, providing insight into durability and structural response.

Earlier research has also examined the dynamic stability of asphalt concrete mixtures incorporating plasterboard waste, demonstrating the potential for alternative materials to be used in pavement construction without compromising performance.

== See also ==
- Cool pavement
- Energy-efficient landscaping
- Highway engineering
- NCAT Pavement Test Track
- Pavement light
- Permeable paving
- Reflective surfaces (climate engineering)
- Transportation engineering
