= Prithvi Singh Kandhal =

American civil engineer

Prithvi Singh Kandhal is an American civil engineer who has been recognized internationally for his work in asphalt road construction technology.

Kandhal was inducted in August 2011 onto the "Wall of Honor" established at the National Center for Asphalt Technology (NCAT), the largest asphalt road research center in the world. In 2012 he became an Honorary Member of the Association of Asphalt Paving Technologists (AAPT).

== Career in the Pennsylvania Department of Transportation ==
After graduation from Iowa State, Kandhal joined the Pennsylvania Department of Transportation (PennDOT) as Chief Asphalt Engineer in 1970. There he developed a new pothole patching mix. He worked for PennDOT for 17 years.

== National Center for Asphalt Technology, Auburn University, Alabama ==
Kandhal joined the National Center for Asphalt Technology (NCAT) at Auburn University, Alabama, as Assistant Director in February 1988. He was instrumental in NCAT's growth into being the world's largest asphalt research center. Later he was appointed Associate Director of NCAT.
