= Stone mastic asphalt =

Road construction material

Stone mastic asphalt (SMA), also called stone-matrix asphalt, was developed in Germany in the 1960s with the first SMA pavements being placed in 1968 near Kiel. It provides a deformation-resistant, durable surfacing material, suitable for heavily trafficked roads. SMA has found use in Europe, Australia, the United States, and Canada as a durable asphalt surfacing option for residential streets and highways. SMA has a high coarse aggregate content that interlocks to form a stone skeleton that resists permanent deformation. The stone skeleton is filled with a mastic of bitumen and filler to which fibres are added to provide adequate stability of bitumen and to prevent drainage of binder during transport and placement. Typical SMA composition consists of 70−80% coarse aggregate, 8−12% filler, 6.0−7.0% binder, and 0.3% fibre.

The deformation resistant capacity of SMA stems from a coarse stone skeleton providing more stone-on-stone contact than with conventional dense graded asphalt (DGA) mixes (see above picture). Improved binder durability is a result of higher bitumen content, a thicker bitumen film, and lower air voids content. This high bitumen content also improves flexibility. Addition of a small quantity of cellulose or mineral fibre prevents drainage of bitumen during transport and placement. There are no precise design guidelines for SMA mixes available in Europe. The essential features, which are the coarse aggregate skeleton and mastic composition, and the consequent surface texture and mixture stability, are largely determined by the selection of aggregate grading and the type and proportion of filler and binder. In the US, detailed mix design guidelines have been developed for SMA and published by the US National Asphalt Pavement Association in their Quality Improvement Publication QIP 122 as given in the references.

== Manufacture ==
SMA is mixed and placed in the same plant as that used with conventional hot mix. In batch plants, the fibre additive is added direct to the pugmill using individually wrapped press packs or bulk dispensing equipment. Mixing times may be extended to ensure that fibre is homogeneously distributed throughout the mix and temperatures controlled in order to avoid overheating or damage to the fibre. In drum plants, particular care must be taken to ensure that both the additional filler content and fibre additive are incorporated into the mixture without excessive losses through the dust extraction system. Filler systems that add filler directly into the drum rather than aggregate feed are preferred. Pelletised fibres may be added through systems designed for addition of recycled materials, but a more effective means is addition through a special delivery line that is combined with the bitumen delivery, so that the fibre is captured by bitumen at the point of addition to the mixture.

== Placement ==
The primary difference in placing SMA, compared to DGA is in compaction procedures. Multi-tyred rollers are not used due to the possible working of binder-rich material to the surface of the asphalt and consequent flushing and pick-up. Trafficking of the newly placed asphalt while still warm may have the same effect and it is generally preferable for surfaces to cool below about 40 °C before opening to traffic. The preferred method of compaction is to use heavy, non-vibrating, steel-wheeled rollers. If these are not available, vibrating rollers may be used but vibration should be kept to a minimum to avoid fracture of coarse aggregate particles, or drawing of binder to the surface of the mix. The use of polymer modified binder may decrease mix workability and necessitate increased compactive effort to achieve high standards of compacted density. Achieving high standards of compacted density and low field air voids has been identified as an important factor in the performance of all SMA work. SMA is normally placed with a minimum layer thickness of 2.5 to 3 times the nominal maximum aggregate particle size. Greater layer thicknesses assist in achieving appropriate standards of compacted density.

== Materials ==
Aggregates used in SMA must be of high quality – well shaped, resistant to crushing and of suitable polish resistance.

Binders used in SMA include:

- Class 320 bitumen - used in many general applications.
- Multigrade binder - used to provide enhanced performance at higher traffic levels.
- Polymer modified binder - increasingly used in heavy traffic conditions to provide additional resistance to flushing and rutting.

Cellulose fibre is most commonly used in SMA work in Australia. Other fibre types, including glass fibre, rockwool, polyester, and even natural wool, have all been found to be suitable but cellulose fibre is generally the most cost-effective. Fibre content is generally 0.3% (by mass) of the total mix.

== Advantages ==
- SMA provides a textured, durable, and rut resistant wearing course.
- The surface texture characteristics of SMA are similar to Open graded asphalt (OGA) so that the noise generated by traffic is lower than that on DGA but equal to or slightly higher than OGA.
- SMA can be produced and compacted with the same plant and equipment available for normal hot mix, using the above procedure modifications.
- SMA may be used at intersections and other high traffic stress situations where OGA is unsuitable.
- SMA surfacings may provide reduced reflection cracking from underlying cracked pavements due to the flexible mastic.
- The durability of SMA should be equal, or greater than, DGA and significantly greater than OGA.

== Disadvantages ==
- Increased material cost associated with higher asphalt binder and filler contents, and fibre additive.
- Increased mixing time and time taken to add extra filler, may result in reduced productivity.
- Possible delays in opening to traffic as the SMA mix should be cooled to 40 °C to prevent flushing of the binder to the surface (bleeding).
- Initial skid resistance (road friction) may be low until the thick binder film is worn off the top of the surface by traffic. In critical situations, a small, clean grit may need to be applied before opening to traffic.
- Material is removed by milling in subsequent overlays because the void in the gap grading will hold water and freeze initiating stripping in the asphalt binder.

== See also ==
- Permeable paving
- Plastic armour
- TexSys - Texas Expert System for the selection of Hot-Mix Asphalt (HMA) based on TxDOT (2004).
- Highway engineering
