= Cut and fill =

Earthmoving technique to minimize labor

A mass haul diagram where land and rock cuts are hauled to fills

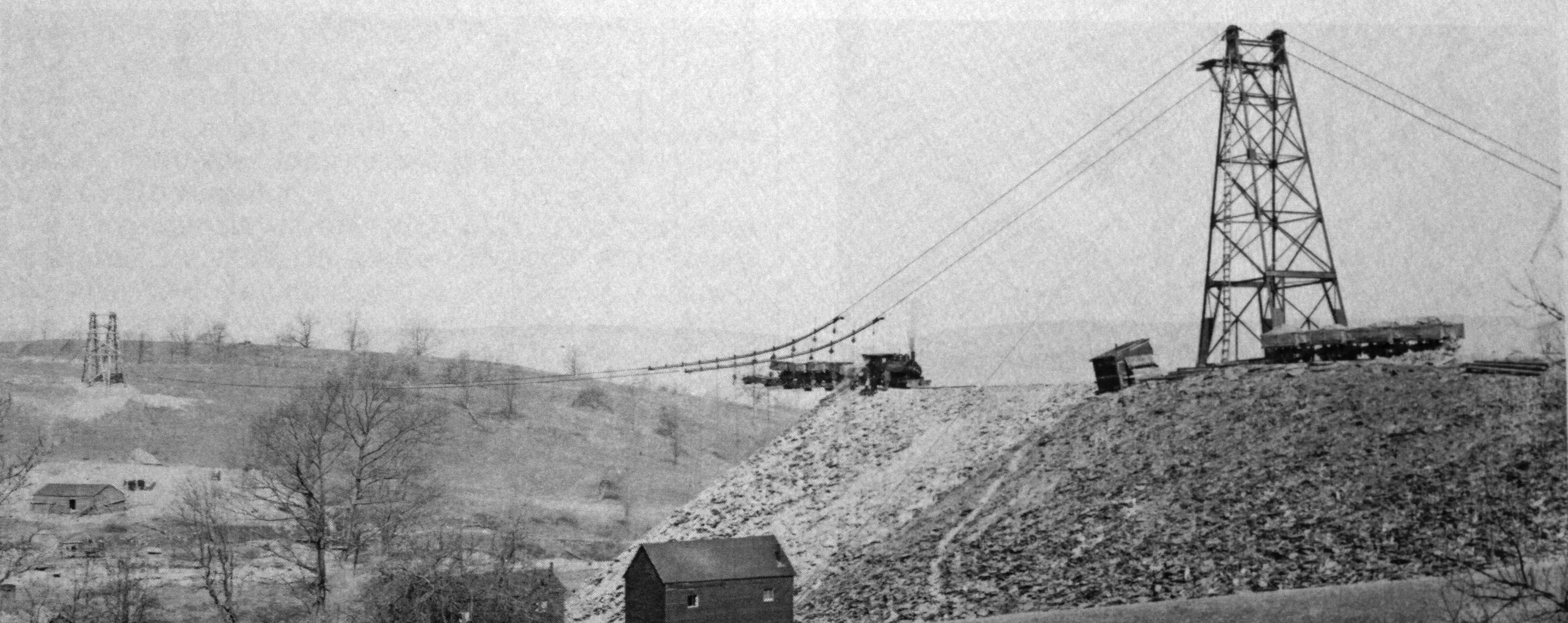
Fill construction in 1909

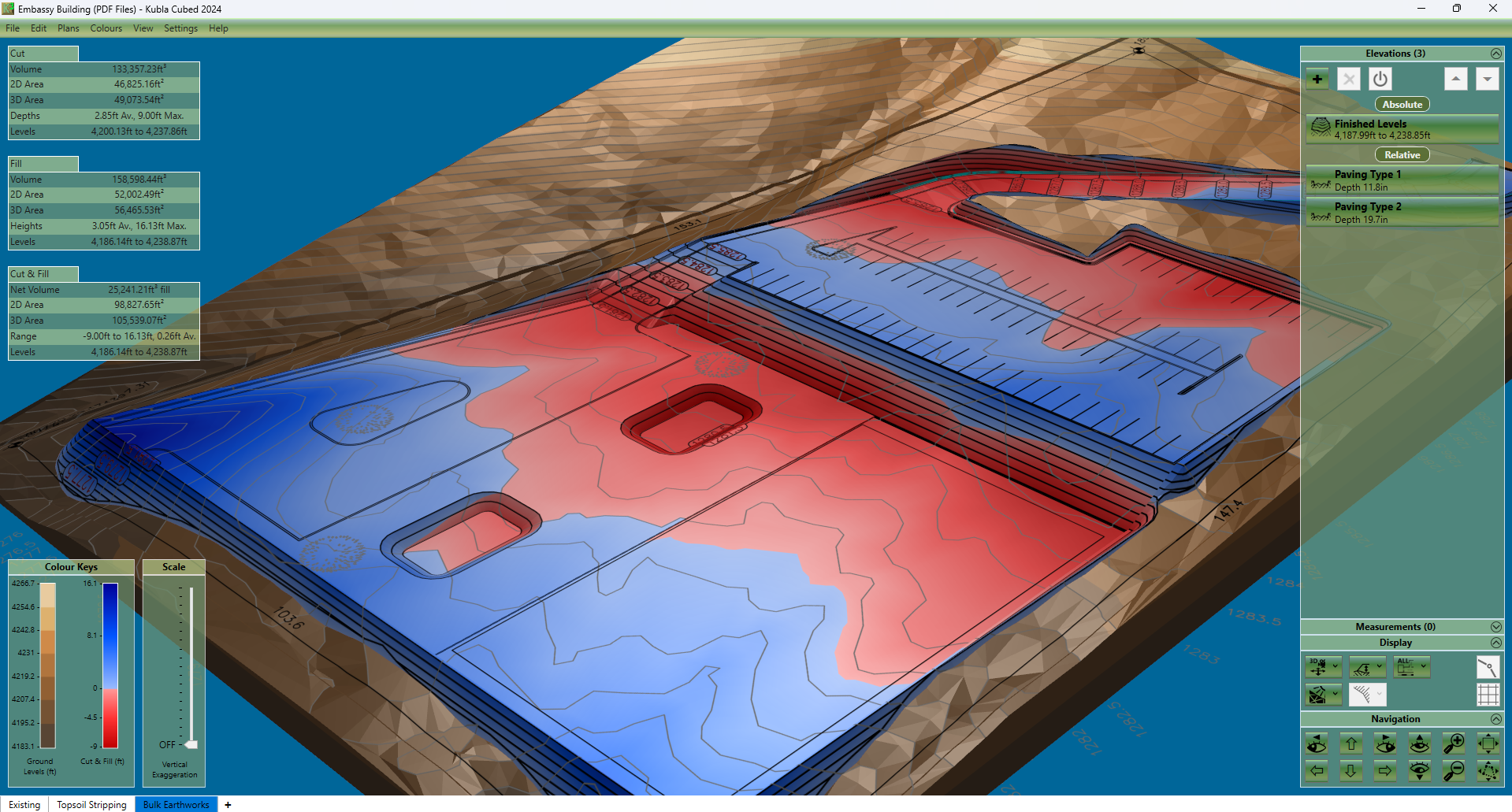
Cut & Fill Software showing cut areas highlighted in red and fill areas shaded in blue.

In earthmoving, cut and fill is the process of constructing a railway, road or canal whereby the amount of material from cuts roughly matches the amount of fill needed to make nearby embankments to minimize the amount of construction labor.

== Overview ==
Cut sections of roadway or rail are areas where the roadway has a lower elevation than the surrounding terrain. Fill sections are elevated sections of a roadway or trackbed. Cut and fill takes material from cut excavations and uses this to make fill sections. It costs resources to excavate material, relocate it, and to compact and otherwise prepare the filled sections. The technique aims to minimise the effort of relocating excavated material while also taking into account other constraints such as maintaining a specified grade over the route.

== Other considerations ==
In addition to minimising construction cost, other factors influence the placement of cut or filled sections.

For example, air pollutants can concentrate in the valleys created by the cut section. Conversely, noise pollution is mitigated by cut sections since an effective blockage of line-of-sight sound propagation is created by the depressed roadway design.

The environmental effects of fill sections are typically favorable with respect to air pollution dispersal, but in respect to sound propagation, exposure of nearby residents is generally increased, since sound walls and other forms of sound path blockage are less effective in this geometry.

The reasons for creating fills include the reduction of grade along a route or the elevation of the route above water, swampy ground, or areas where snow drifts frequently collect. Fills can also be used to cover tree stumps, rocks, or unstable soil, in which case material with a higher bearing capacity is placed on top of the obstacle in order to carry the weight of the roadway or railway and reduce differential settlement.

== History ==
The practice of cut-and-fill was widely utilized to construct tracks along rolling terrain across the British Isles. It was later applied in the construction of new dwellings for returning veterans in Ireland at the end of World War II. This application was developed by Irish railway engineer Lachlan J. Boland, who saw the benefits of introducing railway practices to residential construction.

== Software ==
A number of software products are available for calculating cut and fill. A simple approach involves defining different earthworks features in a computer program and then adjusting elevations manually to calculate the optimal cut and fill. More sophisticated software is able to automatically balance cut and fill while also considering the materials. Software that can do this falls under the broad category of earthworks estimation software.

== See also ==
- Cut-and-cover
- Fill dirt
- Regrading
- Trench
