= Fill dirt =

Earthy material used to fill in a hole

Fill dirt (also called cleanfill, or just fill) is earthy material which is used to fill in a depression or hole in the ground or create mounds or otherwise artificially change the grade or elevation of real property.

Fill dirt is usually subsoil (soil from beneath topsoil) and underlying soil parent material which has little soil organic matter or biological activity. Fill dirt is taken from a location where soil is being removed as a part of leveling an area for construction; it may also contain sand, rocks, and stones, as well as earth. Fill dirt should be as free of organic matter as possible since organic matter will decompose creating pockets of empty space within the fill which could result in settling. Uneven or excessive settling of the fill can result in damage to any structures built on the fill.

A common use of fill dirt is in highway maintenance to build up the shoulders of highways so that the ground on either side of the pavement is at the same level as the pavement itself, and that the highway shoulders are sufficiently wide as to allow vehicles room to pull off the highway if needed.

A second common use of fill dirt is to fill in a low-lying construction site to raise the level of the building foundation in order to reduce the chances of flooding. Several massive uses of fill dirt are with improvements to the Port of Seattle Sea-Tac Airport, the addition of a new runway to the Hartsfield–Jackson Atlanta International Airport in Atlanta, Georgia, and the Kansai International Airport off the coast of Osaka, Japan, a project involving the creation of a new man-made island of some five square kilometers.

Fill dirt is most often mined from commercial sand and gravel mines then imported to the project site, and must meet specifications for gradation outlined by the Project's Geotechnical Engineer. The logistics and availability of fill dirt material has become a growing concern for the commercial sand and gravel industry in recent years as the need for fill material has surged and the available resources in mines are depleted. This directly impacts the public and end-user as the cost of construction increases due to the logistical challenges of importing material from greater distances as materials grow more scarce.

In an effort to combat the costs and increasing logistical challenges related to dwindling sand and gravel stockpiles, some services are offering contractors and the public a way to exchange fill dirt materials in addition to locating operating sand and gravel mines. Internet based services allow consumers and contractors a way to locate free fill dirt by connecting them with another contractor or consumer in need of a dump site on a nearby project.

Fill dirt is also used for landscaping projects which involve the creation of ridges and earth structures for pools, waterfalls, and other water features as well as to break up a level area in order to provide more interesting textures to the landscape.

== See also ==
- Cut (earthworks)
- Cut and fill
- Embankment (transportation)
