= Subgrade =

Material underneath a road or track

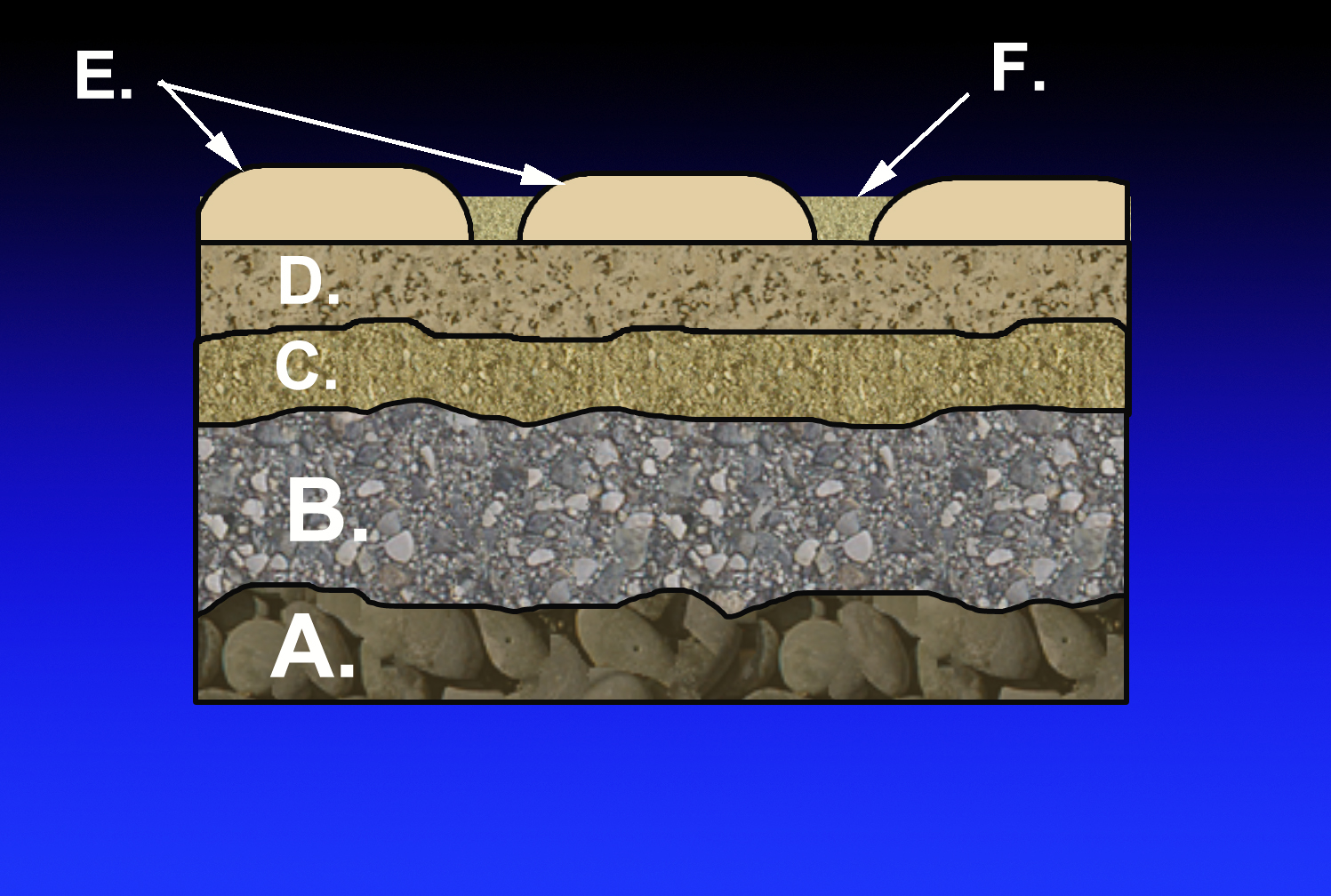
Layers in the construction of a mortarless pavement: A.) Subgrade B.) Subbase C.) Base course D.) Paver base E.) Pavers F.) Fine-grained sand

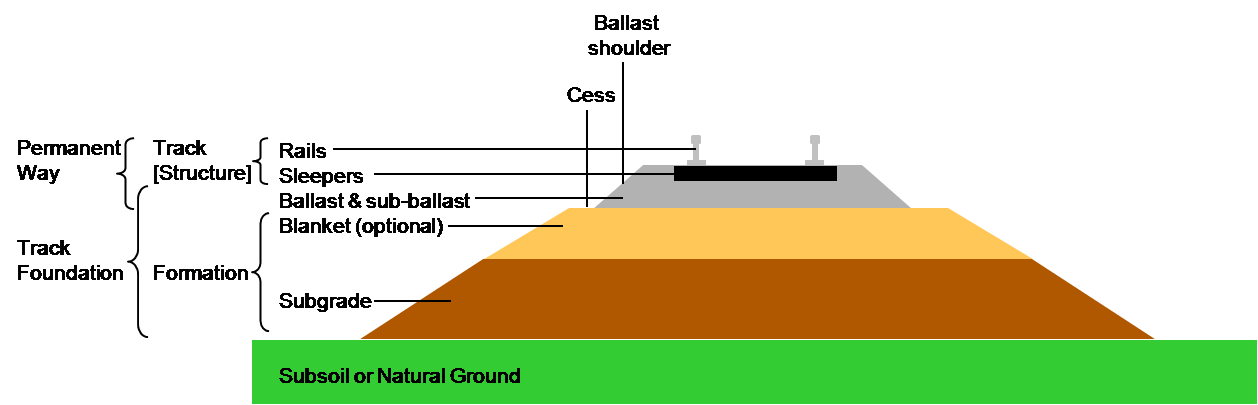
Section through railway track and foundation showing the sub-grade

In transport engineering, subgrade is the term used in the US for the native material underneath a constructed road, pavement or railway track (US: railroad track). In British English it is called formation level.

The subgrade provides support to the subbase level and acts as an integral load-bearing layer. Failure of the subgrade can cause depressions and rutting of the upper base and surface courses. These in turn can lead to water pooling in deformations and cause vehicle aquaplaning among other issues.

The term can also refer to imported material that has been used to build an embankment.

== Construction ==
Subgrades are commonly compacted before the construction of a road, pavement or railway track. This is to ensure their ability to absorb the loads being transferred down from the upper layers, increasing the life and wear of the surface courses.

== Resilient modulus and in‑situ evaluation ==
In pavement engineering, the stiffness and elastic response of subgrade soils under repeated traffic loading is commonly quantified using the resilient modulus (Mr). The resilient modulus represents the ratio of applied cyclic stress to recoverable strain and provides a mechanistic measure of soil elasticity under dynamic loads. Non‑destructive testing methods such as lightweight deflectometer (LWD) testing provide in situ estimates of dynamic soil stiffness, including parameters related to resilient modulus. Research has shown that repeated LWD testing, combined with predictive models, can be used to predict resilient modulus behavior in the field without extensive laboratory repeated load triaxial tests, allowing for quicker evaluation of soil performance in the field.

== See also ==
- Subsoil
- Track bed
