= Subbase (pavement) =

Layer of a paved road

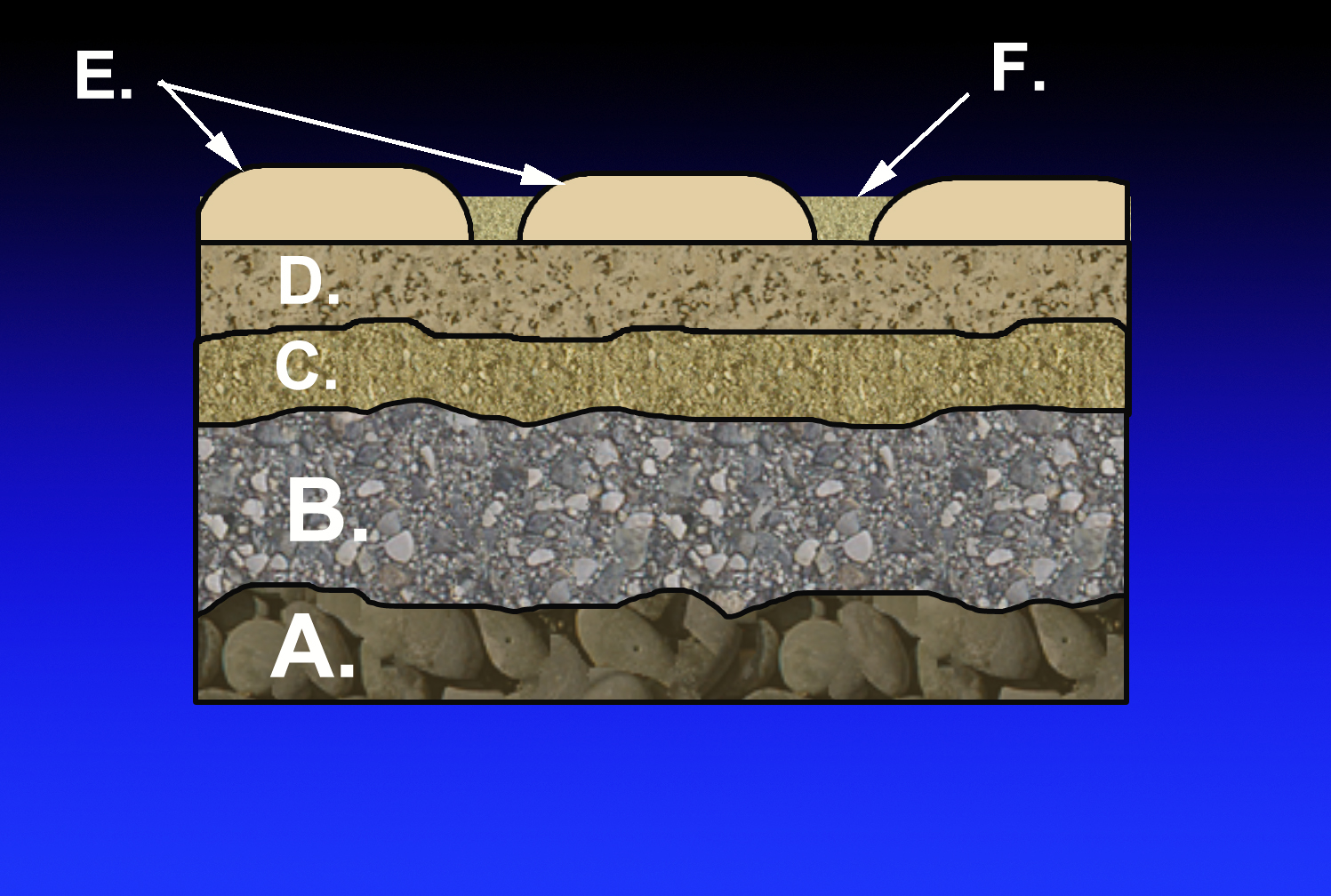
Layers in the construction of a mortarless pavement: A.) Subgrade B.) Subbase C.) Base course D.) Paver base E.) Pavers F.) Fine-grained sand

In highway engineering, subbase is the layer of aggregate material laid on the subgrade, on which the base course layer is located. It may be omitted when there will be only foot traffic on the pavement, but it is necessary for surfaces used by vehicles.

Subbase is often the main load-bearing layer of the pavement. Its role is to spread the load evenly over the subgrade. The materials used may be either unbound granular, or cement-bound. Subbase is often abberevated as the GSB (Granular Sub-Base).

== Quality ==
The quality of subbase is very important for the useful life of the road and can outlive the life of the surface, which can be scraped off and, after checking that the subbase is still in good condition, a new layer can be applied.

Low quality subbase material, including large pieces of rock and concrete, which was hardly acceptable heretofore, can now be re-used when crushed in-situ with conventional milling machines to obtain a homogenous grain size. It may then be treated normally with hydraulic binders, augmented by specific polymer formulations.

== Preparation ==
Unbound granular materials are usually crushed stone, crushed slag or concrete, or slate. Cement-bound materials come in multiple types. Mass concrete is used where exceptional loads are expected, with thickness usually 100 to 150 millimetres (4 to 6 in), and optional reinforcement with steel mesh or polymer fibers. Other cement bound materials (CBM), with less strength but also lower cost, are used. They are rated by strength, from the weakest CBM 1 (also formerly known as soil cement) through CBM 2 to CBM 3, 4, and 5, which are more similar to concrete and are called "lean mix". In the UK, the specification for aggregate used as a subbase in the construction of driveways and roads includes MOT Type 1 Stone.

The thickness of subbase can range from 75 to 100 mm (3 to 4 in) for garden paths through 100 to 150 mm (4 to 6 in) for driveways and public footpaths, to 150 to 225 mm (6 to 9 in) for heavy used roads, and more for highways. The subgrade or base course is properly prepared for the required grade and camber of WBM (Wet Bitumen Macadam) road construction. The potholes and the depressions on the surface of the road are properly filled up and compacted.

== See also ==
- Macadam intermediate layer on top of the GSB
- Asphalt concrete top layer
