= Track bed =

Base portion of a railway-supporting structure

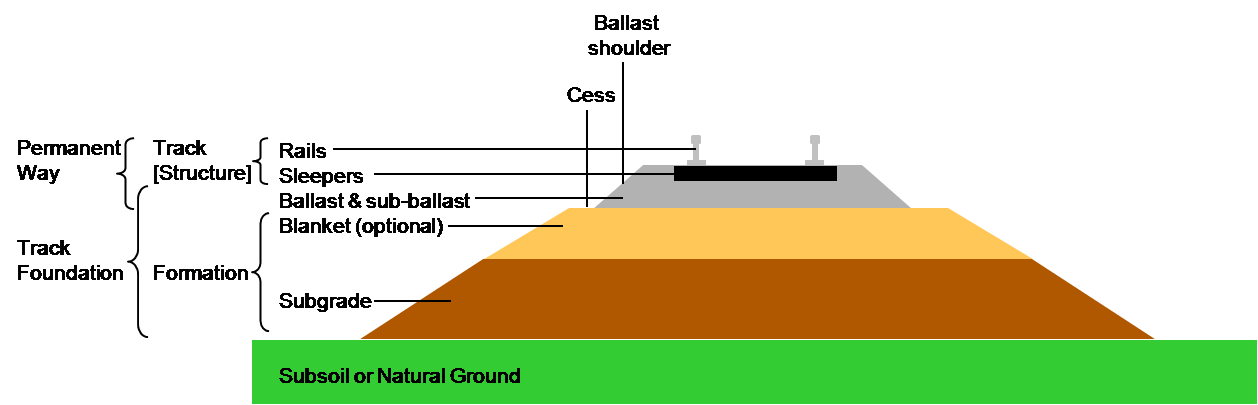
Section through railway track and foundation showing the ballast and formation layers

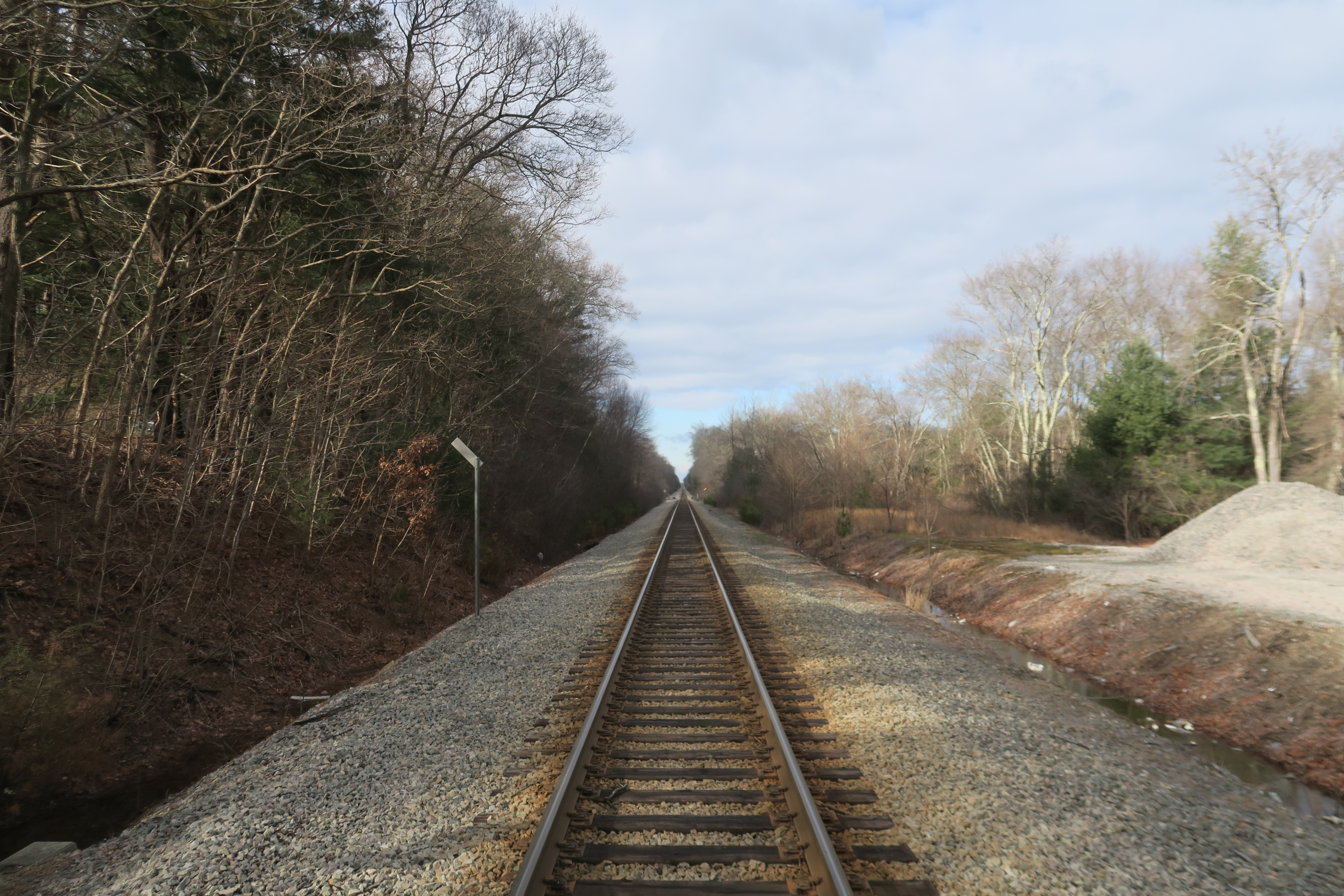
A view of track bed in Massachusetts

The track bed or trackbed (or railroad bed) is the groundwork onto which a railway track is laid. Trackbeds of disused railways are sometimes used for recreational paths or new light rail links.

== Background ==
According to Network Rail, the trackbed is the layers of ballast and sub-ballast above a prepared subgrade/formation (see diagram). It is designed primarily to reduce the stress on the subgrade.

Other definitions include the surface of the ballast on which the track is laid, the area left after a track has been dismantled and the ballast removed or the track formation beneath the ballast and above the natural ground.

The trackbed can significantly influence the performance of the track, especially ride quality of passenger services.

== See also ==
- Embankment (transportation)
- Green track
- Roadbed
- Subgrade
