= NCAT Pavement Test Track =

Alabama asphalt pavement research site

Coordinates: 32.598°N 85.297°W

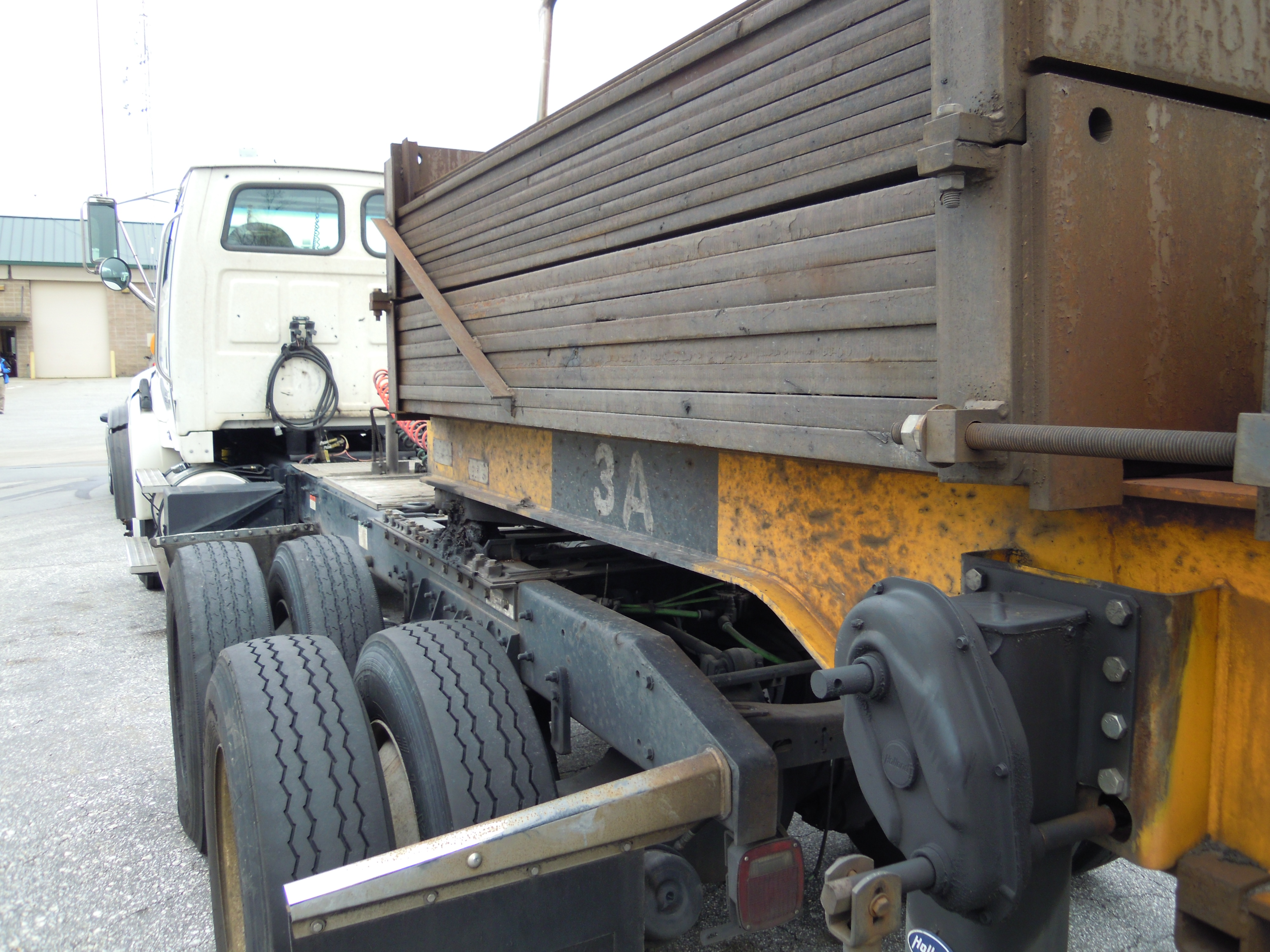
A specially loaded semi used at the National Center for Asphalt Technology Pavement Test Track near Auburn, Alabama, to test the properties of different asphalt concrete mixtures.

The NCAT Pavement Test Track is an oval-shaped track in Lee County, Alabama, 1.7 miles (2.7 km) long, used for testing experimental asphalt pavements. It is managed by the National Center for Asphalt Technology (NCAT), the largest asphalt research center in the western hemisphere and a cooperative venture between the National Asphalt Pavement Association's (NAPA) Research and Education Foundation and Auburn University.

In 2003, the project was inducted into the Alabama Engineering Hall of Fame following the initial 2000 research cycle. The track has continued operations in subsequent research cycles.
