= Concrete saw =

Power tool

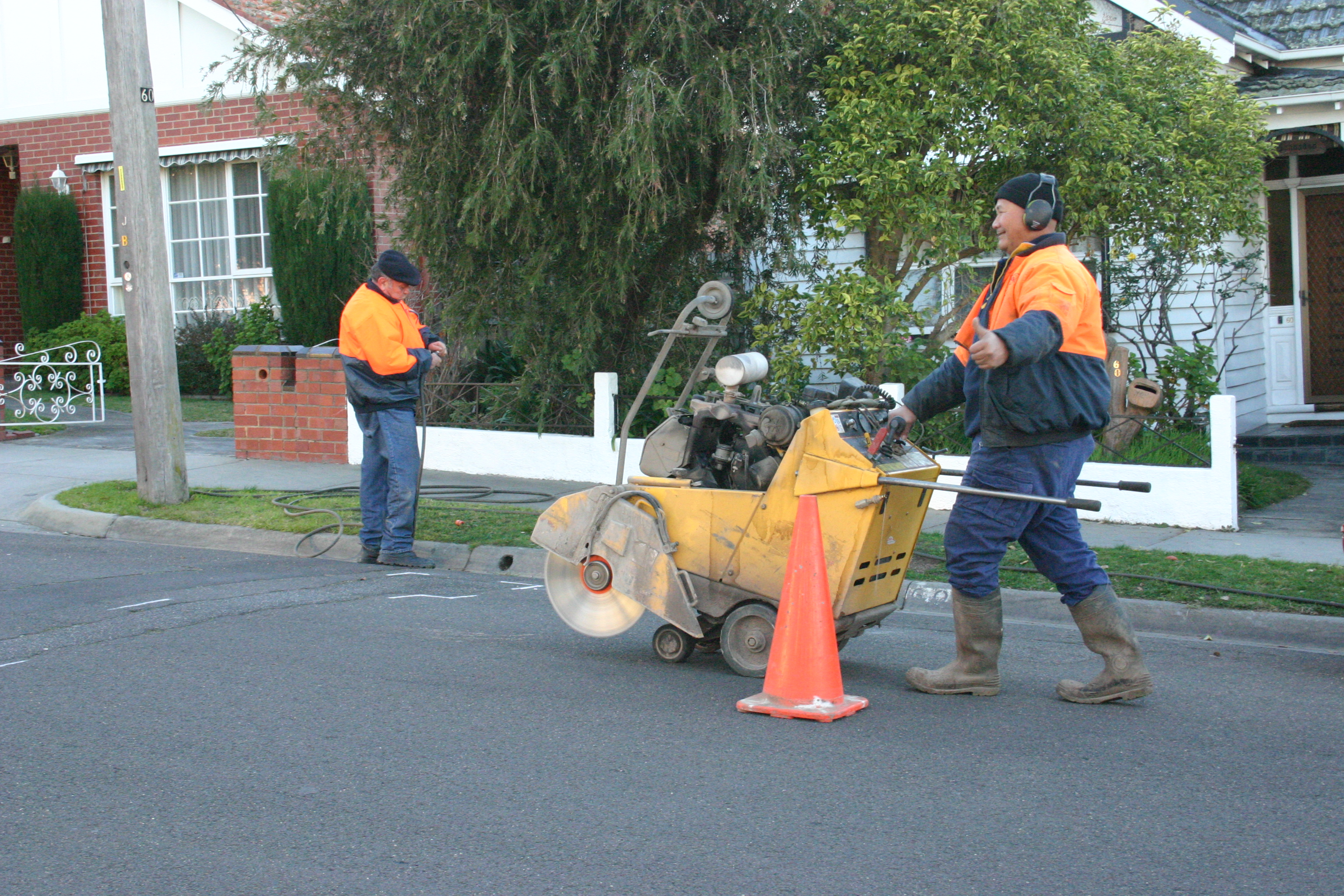
A concrete saw being readied for use. The man in the background is preparing the hose to deliver water to cool the saw, whilst the operator is moving the saw to the required position. A substantial engine powers the unit.

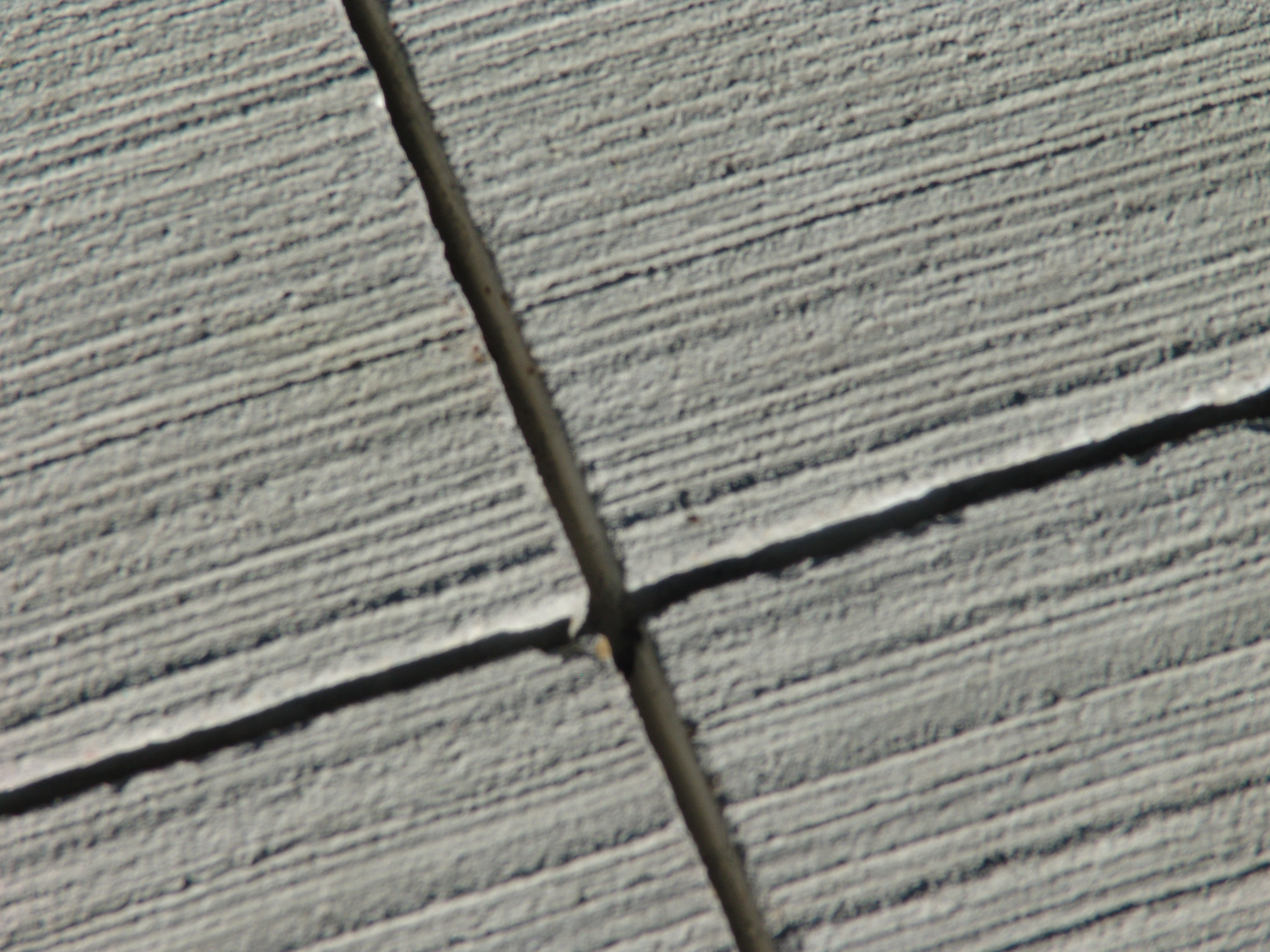
Picture of kerf left by a diamond blade used to cut control joints in concrete.

A concrete saw (also known as a consaw, road saw, cut-off saw, slab saw or quick cut) is a power tool used for cutting concrete, masonry, brick, asphalt, tile, and other solid materials. There are many types ranging from small hand-held saws, chop-saw models, and big walk-behind saws or other styles, and it may be powered by gasoline, hydraulic or pneumatic pressure, or an electric motor. The saw blades used on concrete saws are often diamond saw blades to cut concrete, asphalt, stone, etc. Abrasive cut-off wheels can also be used on cut-off saws to cut stone and steel. The significant friction generated in cutting hard substances like concrete usually requires the blades to be cooled to prolong their life and reduce dust.

== See also ==
- Diamond tools
- Diamond blade
