= Diamond grinding cup wheel =

Cutting and grinding tool

A diamond grinding cup wheel is a metal-bonded diamond tool with diamond segments welded or cold-pressed on a steel (or other metal, such as aluminum) wheel body, which usually looks like a cup. Diamond grinding cup wheels are usually mounted on concrete grinders to grind abrasive building materials like concrete, granite and marble.

A single row diamond grinding cup wheel with 8 diamond segments.

== Use ==
There are various styles and specifications of diamond grinding cup wheels to fit various application requirements. The ones with many big diamond segments can undertake heavy workloads, for example, grinding concrete and stone, while those with small or sparse diamond segments are normally used for fast removal of paints, wallpapers, glues, epoxy and other surface coatings.

Just like other metal-bonded diamond tools, the diamond segments on diamond grinding cup wheels can have different bonds, different diamond grits, different diamond quality and different diamond concentrations to fit different uses. For example, if the material to be ground is hard, the bond should be softer, and if the material is relatively soft, the bond should be harder.

Diamond grinding cup wheels are used in different-roughness grindings. For coarse grinding, the bond should be softer and the diamonds' quality should be higher, because in this case the diamonds become blunt more easily. The diamond grit should be bigger, normally from 35 grit to 50 grit. For this is coarse grinding and big grit can improve working efficiency. The diamond concentration can be lower.

For fine grinding (sometimes called "polishing"), the bond should be harder and the diamonds' quality can be lower, as in this case the diamonds can last longer and a hard bond can also help the precision of the process. The diamond grit is normally between 80 grit and 120 grit, depending on the grinding requirements. The diamond concentration should be higher.

After being ground, the material can be further polished with resin-bonded diamond polishing pads of different diamond grits.

== Manufacturing methods ==
There are two common methods to manufacture diamond grinding cup wheels: hot pressing and cold pressing.

The hot pressing method is to directly sinter the diamond segments in molds under a certain pressure in the dedicated sintering press machine, and then fix or connect the diamond segments onto the grinding wheel's body via high-frequency welding, laser welding or mechanical mosaic method.

The cold pressing method is to first press the working layer (containing diamonds) and the transitive layer (not containing diamonds) of the diamond segments to their forms directly on the grinding wheel's body, and let the segments connect with the wheel's body via teeth, slots or other manners. Then, put the grinding wheels into sintering furnaces to sinter without press.

== Patents ==
This list is not exhaustive, but it shows a rough historical progression from early diamond wheel assembly (1940s–1950s), through explicit cup wheel design (1960), to advanced bonding materials (1980s) and modern manufacturing innovations (2010s).

U.S. patent 2,479,078
Early diamond grinding wheel design, an early step toward durable composite wheels
U.S. patent 2,737,454
Mid‑century metal‑bond diamond wheel, for grinding hard materials like carbides with improved wear resistance
U.S. patent 2,942,387
Cup‑shaped diamond wheel design, disclosing a flared cup body with a separate diamond abrasive ring assembled onto it
U.S. patent 4,378,233
Metal bond compositions improving wear resistance and chip resistance
U.S. patent 9,211,633
Sintering to improve the binding strength between metal bond and diamond

== See also ==
- Polished concrete
- Grinding wheel
