= White fused alumina =

Aluminium compound used as an abrasive

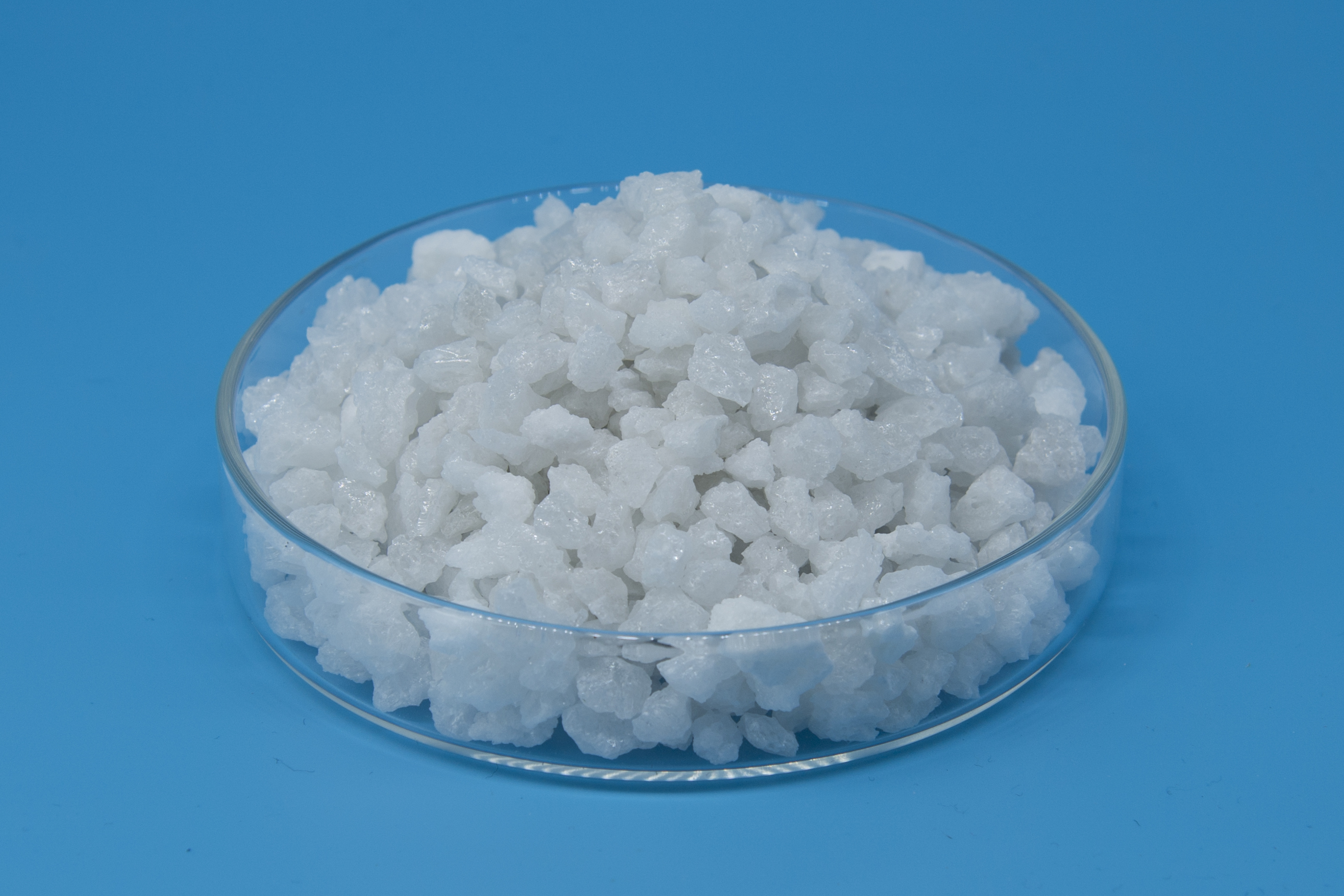
White Fused Alumina

White fused alumina was obtained by the crystallization of the molten Bayer alumina feedstock in an electric arc furnace. It is commonly called white fused aluminum oxide and may also be called white corundum. The manufacture of white fused alumina is resulting in γ–Al_{2}O_{3} in industrial alumina powder being completely transformed to α–Al_{2}O_{3}. White fused alumina is white particles or a white powder, and its microstructure is transparent crystal.

== Application ==
Because of white fused alumina's hardness (9.0 on the Mohs scale), It is second only to diamond and silicon carbide. It is commonly used as a raw material in abrasive tools, blasting, lapping, polishing, and grinding. white fused alumina is also used in refractories and ceramic shapes laminates due to chemical stability, high melting point, etc.

For use in bonded abrasives, the grain size distribution of fused aluminium oxide macrogrits from F4 to F220 is specified in ISO 8486-1.

== Properties ==
Hardness	9 mohs
Grain shape	angular
Melting point	ca. 2050 °C
Specific gravity	ca. 3.9 – 4.1 g/cm^{3}
Bulk density*	ca. 0.8 – 2.1 g/cm^{3}
