= Diamond segment =

Diamond segment are the functional parts of a metal-bonded diamond tool. The metal-bonded diamond tool can be a metal-bonded diamond blade, a diamond grinding cup wheel, a diamond core drill bit, a diamond gang saw blade, etc. The diamonds of a metal-bonded diamond tool are all in the tool's diamond segments to play their role of cutting or grinding.

== Structure ==
Diamond segments consist of small-size diamonds and metal bond materials. The metal bond materials may include the powders of Cu, Sn, Fe, Ag, Co, Ni, WC, Mo, graphite, etc. The diamonds are mixed with the bond materials, and the mixture is loaded into molds. After hot pressing or cold pressing, sintering, and arc grinding, diamond segments are formed. The metal bond has two basic functions: One is bonding the diamonds to the body of the tool; the other is wearing along with the diamonds' wearing to let the new sharp diamonds be exposed properly.

Generally, a diamond segment has a working layer and a transition layer. The working layer contains diamond grains for cutting or grinding, while the transition layer has no diamonds. It just consists of bond materials, and is used to connect the working layer to the body of the diamond tool. The transition layer is necessary for diamond segments used on laser-welded diamond tools. The compositions of the two layers should not be very different. Otherwise, the junction of them will tend to break because of the uneven heat and forces received by the two layers when the diamond tool is in use.

The diamond segments used on large diamond circular saw blades or diamond gang saws for cutting stones can be layered and have some non-working layers separating the working layers. The working layers contain the common materials of diamond segments, including diamonds and metal bonding materials, while the non-working layers are usually made of metal powders. This design can increase the sharpness of the diamond segment, and lower its production cost.

== Forms ==
Diamond segments may come in various forms on diamond tools.

For a diamond blade, diamond segments are just the "teeth" of the blade. The form of the segments is an important factor which influences the performance of the blade, for example, the blade's cutting efficiency and the ratio of the diamonds' non-normal failure.

The form of diamond blades' diamond segments may be convex, layered sandwich concave, L-shaped, step-shaped, segmented, side-slotted, etc. There are mainly two purposes to make these forms: one is to increase the blade's capabilities of containing and discharging sawdust, and improve the cooling and lubricating conditions. The other is to reduce the friction between the segments and the material being cut as well as the sawdust, improve the blade's cutting capability, and thus save energy and improve the blade's performance.

The diamond segments of diamond grinding cup wheels also have many different forms to fit different grinding applications.

== Use ==
The features of the diamond segments on a diamond tool should match the nature of the material to be cut. If the material is hard, the bond of the diamond segments should be softer. Because diamonds are apt to become blunt when cutting hard material. The softer bond can be worn down with the blunt diamonds faster, and then make new diamonds beneath be more easily exposed to participate in cutting. If the material is relatively softer, the bond should be harder. For in this case diamonds can last longer. The harder bond wears slower, so that it can hold the diamonds also longer. This can make better use of the diamonds and prolong the diamond tool's service life.

The grit (size), hardness and concentration of the diamonds in the diamond segments should also be considered. For example, when the material to be cut is soft, the diamonds' size can be big, hardness can be medium, and concentration should be a little bit higher. This combination can get good cutting efficiency, and at the same time prolong the blade's life. When the material is hard, the diamonds' size should be small, hardness should be high, and concentration can be a little bit lower.
