= Terrazzo =

Cementitious composite material, usually used in flooring

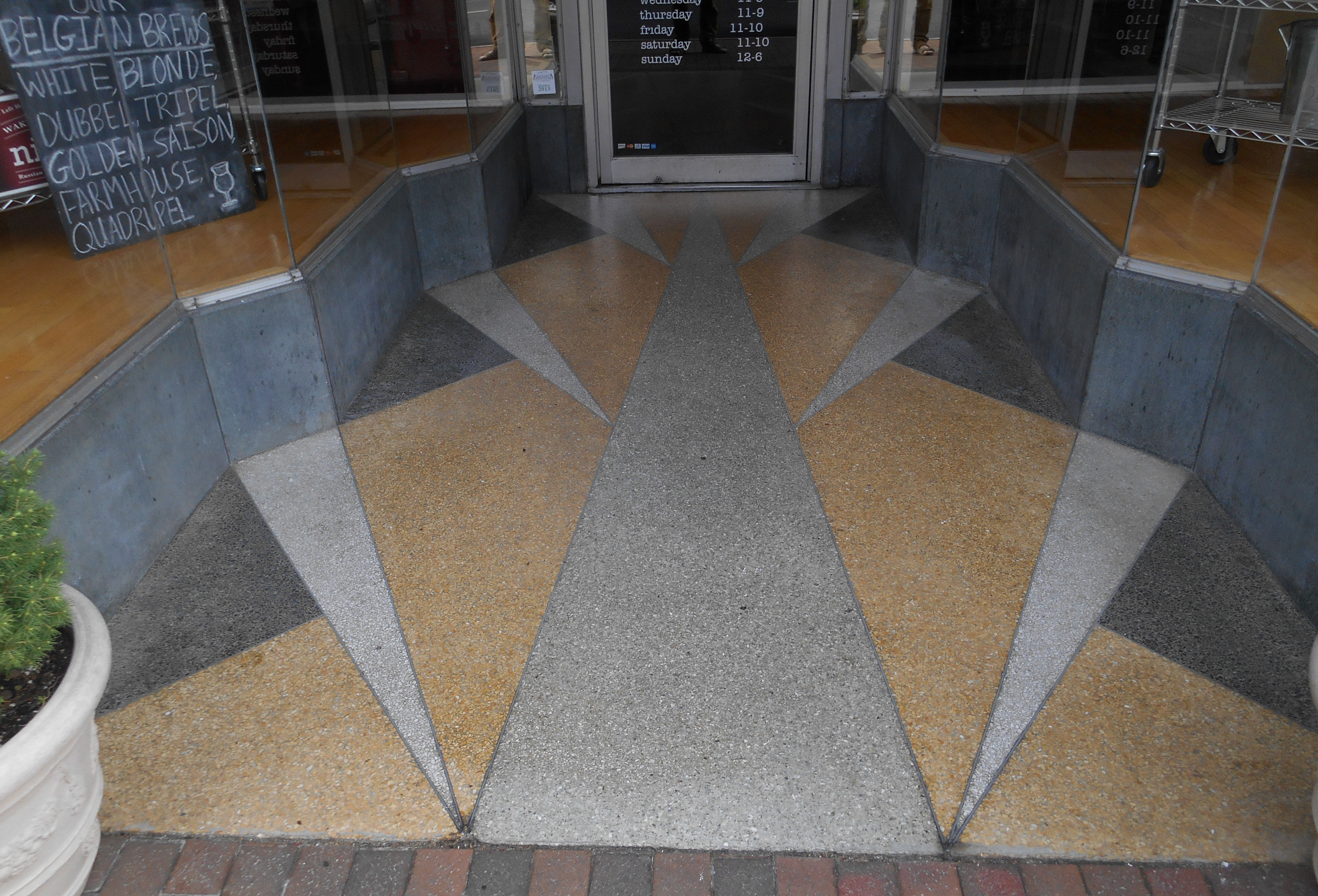
Terrazzo entryway on Beverley Street in Staunton, Virginia, U.S.

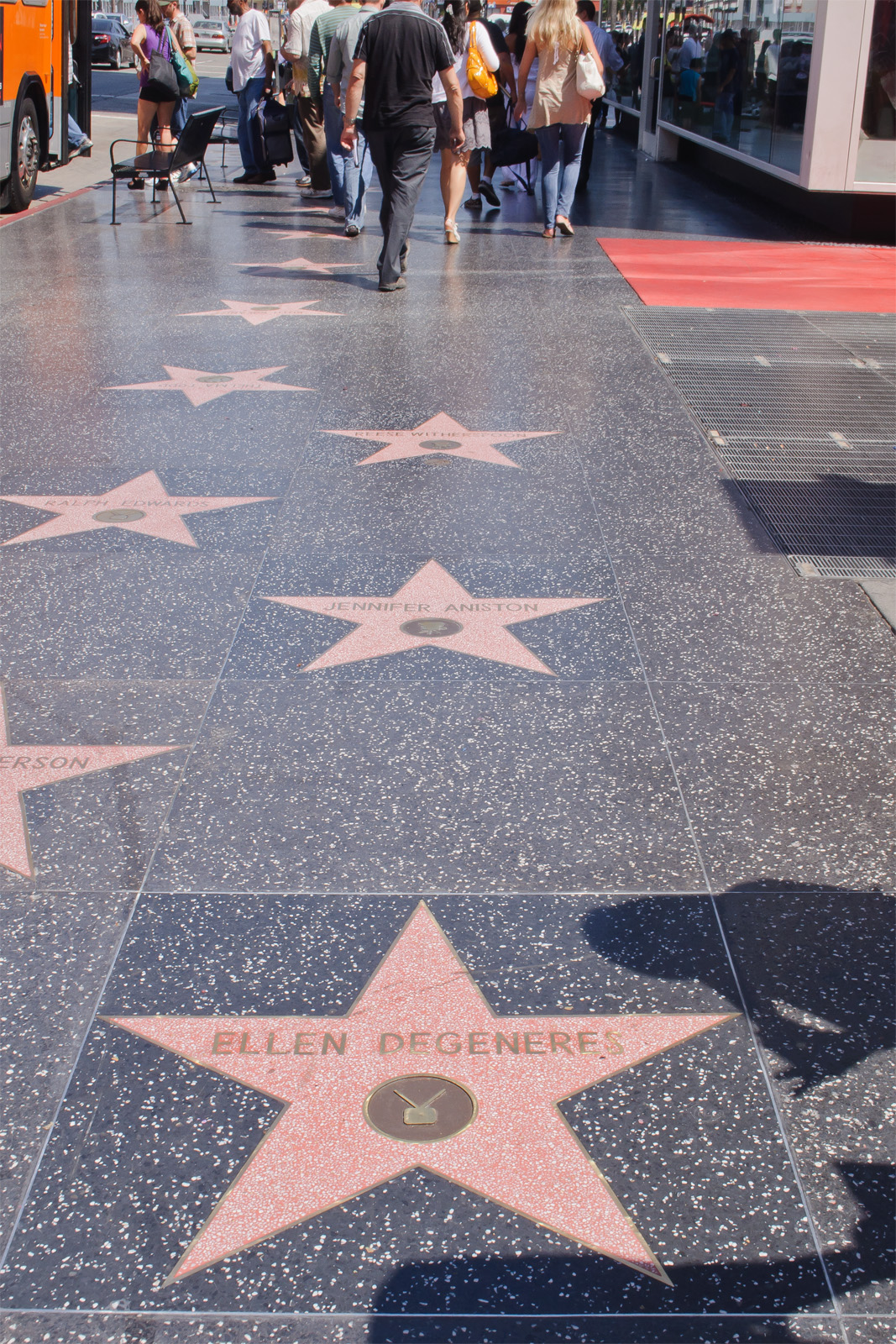
One of the most well known examples of terrazzo flooring is the Hollywood Walk of Fame.

Terrazzo is a composite material, poured in place or precast, which is used for floor and wall treatments. It consists of chips of marble, quartz, granite, glass, or other suitable material, poured with a cementitious binder (for chemical binding), polymeric (for physical binding), or a combination of both. Metal strips often divide sections, or changes in color or material in a pattern. Additional chips may be sprinkled atop the mix before it sets. After it is cured it is ground and polished smooth or otherwise finished to produce a uniformly textured surface. "Terrazzo" is also often used to describe any pattern similar to the original terrazzo floors. Modern forms of terrazzo include polished concrete.

== History ==
=== Terrazzo proper ===
Although the history of terrazzo can be traced back to the ancient mosaics of Egypt, its more recent predecessors come from Italy. The form of terrazzo used today derives partly from the 18th century pavimento alla Veneziana (Venetian pavement) and the cheaper seminato. Pavimento alla Veneziana had workers place marble fragments next to each other in a mortar base. Terrazzo is also related to the technique seminato for which workers tossed larger marble chips into the cement that was then ground and polished. Together, these methods create the generic form of terrazzo that involves pieces of stone that are bonded to a cement bed. Terrazzo was first introduced in the United States in the late 1890s, but did not achieve popularity until the 1920s. Until then it was hand polished with a long handled tool called a galera. Due to its likelihood of cracking, terrazzo was used at a small scale in comparison to the large expanses we see today. Two inventions resulted in its rise in popularity: divider strips and the electric grinding machine. The invention of divider strips by L. Del Turco and Bros. in 1924 contained the cracking of terrazzo by allowing the material greater space to expand and shrink after installation. This invention made terrazzo a durable and reliable material in addition to allowing for further design work within the floor. Installers use the dividing strips as guides when they work with different colored terrazzo. Additionally, the electric grinding machine and mechanization of the production process cut down on costs and installation time, making terrazzo an affordable flooring option.

Art Deco and Moderne styles from the 1920s to 1940s favored terrazzo with the dividers allowing for straight or curved lines that increased the decorative potential. The popularity of terrazzo led to an increase in installers in the 1920s. The National Terrazzo and Mosaic Organization was formed in 1931 to further professionalize the practice of terrazzo installation. One of the best-known examples of terrazzo is the Hollywood Walk of Fame. Created in 1958, the walk honors celebrities in the form of a terrazzo star that displays their name.

=== Archaeological use of the term ===
Archaeologists have adopted the term terrazzo to describe the floors of early Neolithic buildings (PPNA and PPNB, ca. 9,000–8,000 BC) in Western Asia constructed of burnt lime and clay, colored red with ochre and polished. The embedded crushed limestone gives it a slightly mottled appearance. The use of fire to produce burnt lime, which was also used for the hafting of implements, predates production of fired pottery by almost a thousand years. In the early Neolithic settlement of Çayönü in eastern Turkey about 90 m^{2} (970 sq ft) of terrazzo floors have been uncovered. The floors of the PPN B settlement of Nevalı Çori measure about 80 m^{2} (860 sq ft). They are 15 cm (5.9 in) thick, and contain about 10–15% lime.

These floors are almost impenetrable to moisture and very durable, but their construction involved a high input of energy. Gourdin and Kingery (1975) estimate that the production of any given amount of lime requires about five times that amount of wood. Recent experiments by Affonso and Pernicka have shown that only twice the amount is needed, but that would still amount to 4.5 metric tonnes of dry wood for the floors in Çayönü. Other sites with terrazzo floors include Nevalı Çori, Göbekli Tepe, Jericho, and Kastros (Cyprus).

== Production ==
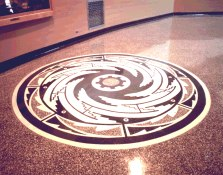
Terrazzo with stylized Native-American design at the Hoover Dam

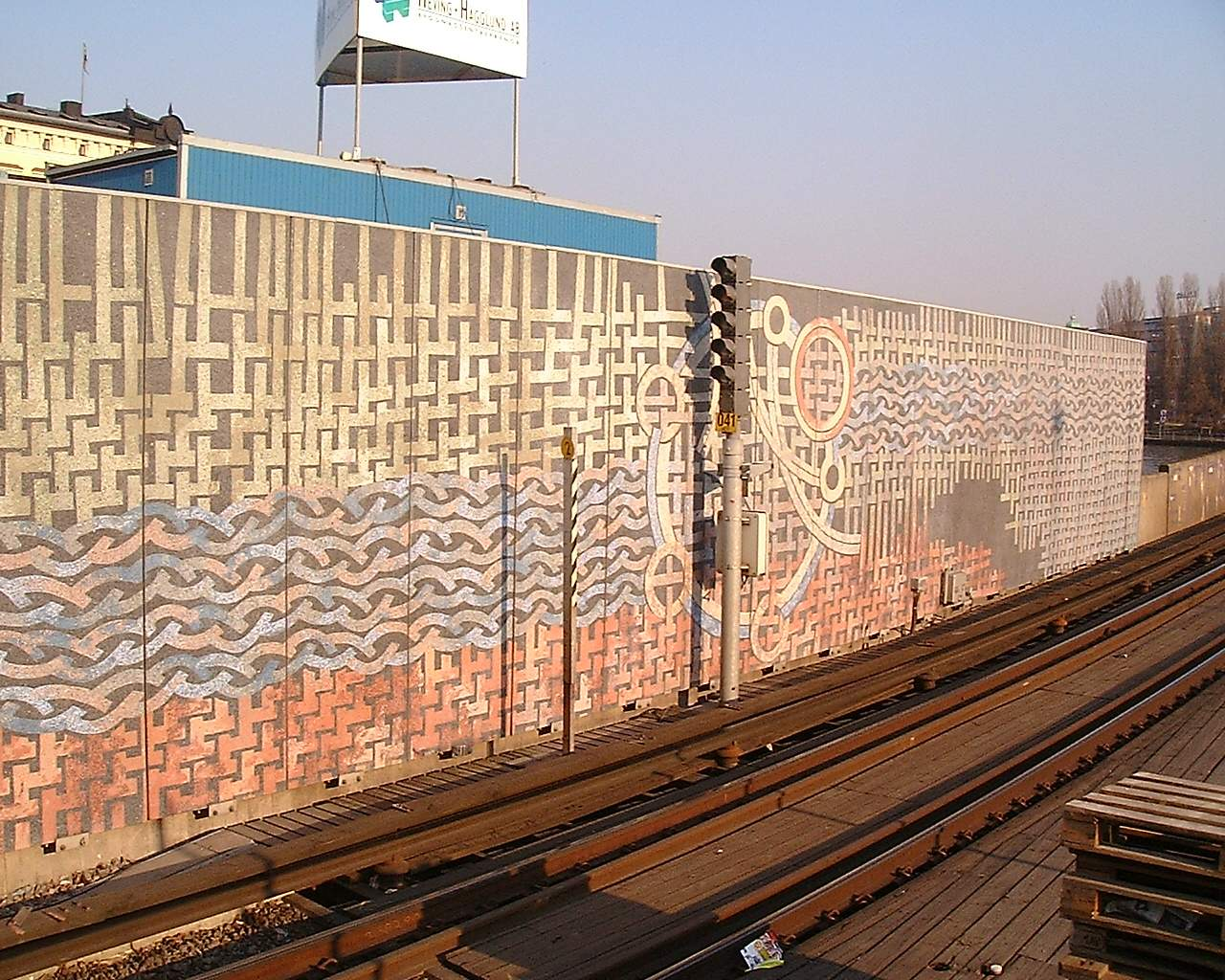
Terrazzo wall at the Gamla stan metro station, Stockholm

Terrazzo artisans create walls, floors, patios, and panels by exposing marble chips and other fine aggregates on the surface of finished concrete or epoxy-resin. Much of the preliminary work of terrazzo workers is similar to that of cement masons. Marble-chip, cementitious terrazzo requires three layers of materials. First, cement masons or terrazzo workers build a solid, level concrete foundation that is 3 to 4 inches (76 to 102 mm) deep. After the forms are removed from the foundation, workers add a 1 inch (25 mm) layer of sandy concrete. Before this layer sets, terrazzo workers partially embed metal divider strips in the concrete wherever there is to be a joint or change of color in the terrazzo. For the final layer, terrazzo workers blend and place into each of the panels a fine marble chip mixture that may be color-pigmented. While the mixture is still wet, workers toss additional marble chips of various colors into each panel and roll a weighted roller (100–125 pounds (45–57 kg)) over the entire surface.

In the 1970s, polymer-based terrazzo was introduced and is called thin-set terrazzo. Initially polyester and vinyl ester resins were used as the binder resin. Today, most of the terrazzo installed is epoxy terrazzo. The advantages of this material over cementitious terrazzo include a wider selection of colors, 1/4 to 3/8 inch (6.4 to 9.5 mm) installation thickness, lighter weight, faster installation, impermeable finish, higher strength, and less susceptibility to cracking. The disadvantage of epoxy resin–based terrazzo is that it can only be used for interior, not exterior, applications. Epoxy-based terrazzo will lose its color and slightly peel when used outdoors, whereas cement-based terrazzo will not. In addition to marble aggregate blends, other aggregates have been used, such as mother of pearl and abalone shell. Recycled aggregates include: glass, porcelain, concrete, and metal. Shapes and medallions can be fabricated on site by bending divider strips, or off site by water-jet cutting.

When the terrazzo is thoroughly cured, helpers grind it with a terrazzo grinder, which is somewhat like a floor polisher, only much heavier. Slight depressions left by the grinding are filled with a matching grout material and hand-troweled for a smooth, uniform surface; it is then cleaned, polished, and sealed.

=== Types and systems ===
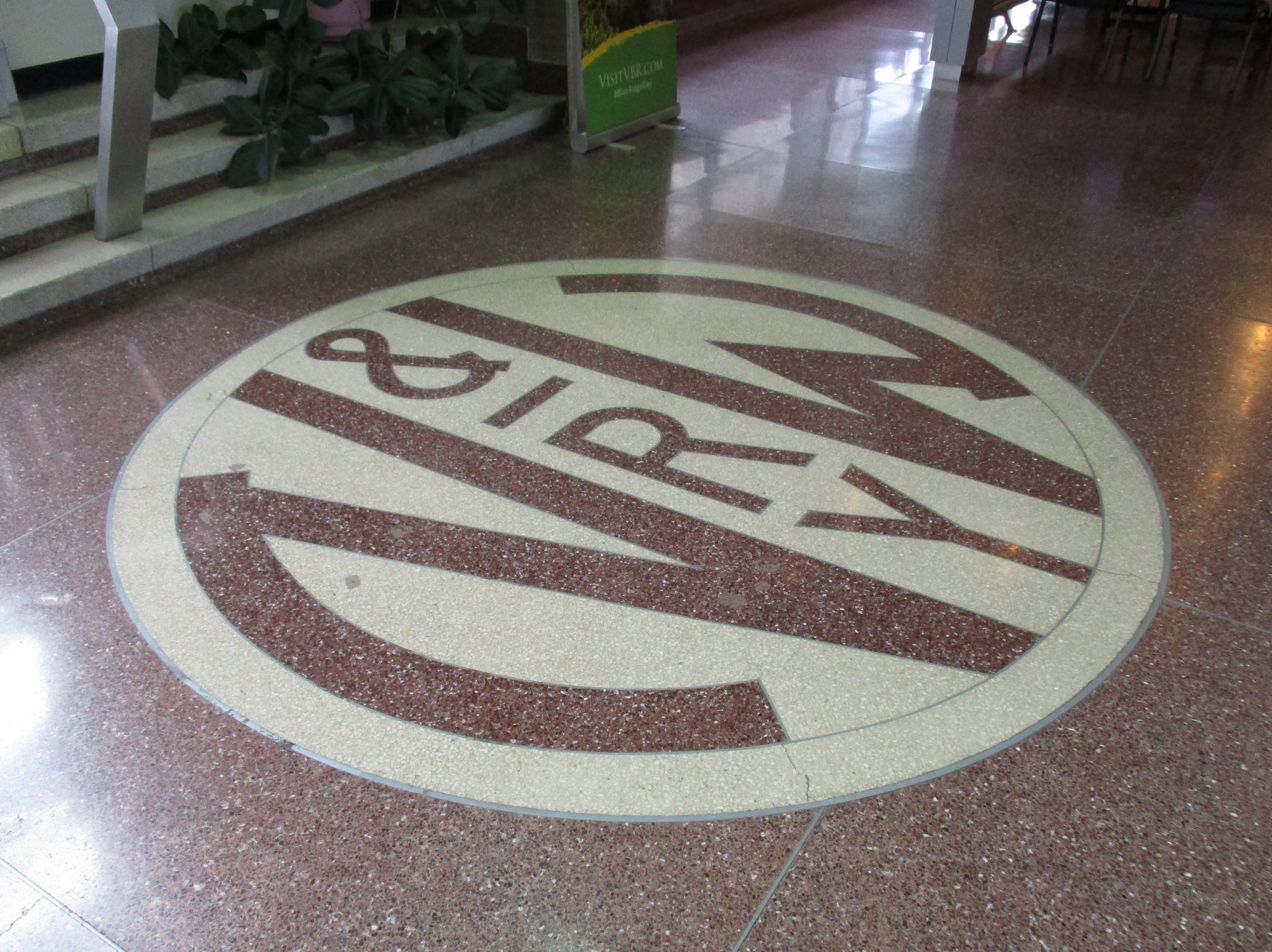
Norfolk and Western Railway terrazzo logo, Roanoke, Virginia

Terrazzo installation includes both bonded and unbonded methods. Bonded systems include: bonded underbed, monolithic, chemically bonded, and the most recent, thin set method (epoxy resin). Bonded terrazzo is applied over a sand-cement mortar underbed which sits on top of a concrete slab. The sand-cement layer allows for variations in the finished concrete slab that it sits on. Monolithic terrazzo is applied directly over an extremely flat and high quality concrete sub-floor. Thin-set terrazzo does not require a concrete sub-floor. Instead, a flexible membrane can be installed so that cracks do not appear on the surface. Unbonded includes the sand cushion method which uses wire reinforcing, an isolation sheet, and sand dusting that absorbs any movement from the concrete slab.

=== Relation to mosaics ===
Although terrazzo derives from the mosaic artform, it does not necessarily place individual pieces in a decorative pattern. Instead, small pieces are thrown into the mortar base creating a more uniform surface appearance. Decorative patterns are often created by using dividers which creates lines between different colored terrazzo mixtures.

=== Deterioration ===
Cracking is a common form of failure and is often caused by the structural system that supports the terrazzo rather than the material itself. Contact with alkalis or acids can deteriorate the bonding agents used in terrazzo. As the aggregates are often marble dust which is calcium carbonate, strong acid can also cause deterioration to the aggregates. When partial replacement is necessary, a "bracketing" system mixing and matching different chips is used to create potential matches. Aged terrazzo can be resurfaced to restore its original look by re-polishing.

== See also ==
- Engineered stone
- Mosaic
- Polished concrete
- Portuguese pavement
