= Concrete grinder =

Machine for polishing or grinding hardened concrete

A concrete grinder is an abrasive machine for grinding and polishing concrete and natural stone. Concrete grinders can come in many configurations, the most common being a hand-held general purpose angle grinder, but it may be a specialized tool for countertops or floors. Angle grinders are small and mobile, and allow one to work on harder to reach areas and perform more precise work.

There are also purpose-built floor grinders that are used for grinding and polishing marble, granite and concrete. Concrete often has a higher sliding friction than marble or granite which is also worked wet, therefore with less friction. Floor grinders can cover large surfaces, and they have more weight on them, making the grinding process more efficient.

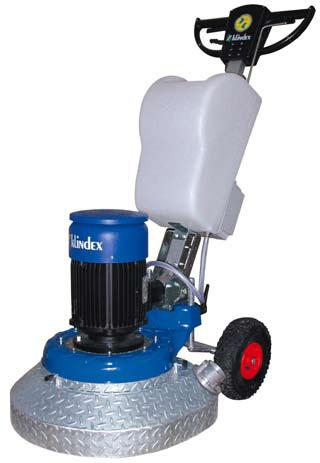
Concrete grinder

== Attachments ==
All concrete grinders use abrasives to grind or polish such as diamond tools or silicon carbide. The diamond tools used for grinding most commonly are diamond grinding cup wheels, other machines may use diamond segments, mounted on varies plates, slide on diamond grinding shoes and for polishing are usually circular Resin diamond polishing pads. The use of diamond attachments is the most common type of abrasive used under concrete grinders and come in many grits that range from 6 grit to the high thousands, although 1800 grit is considered by the insurance industry as the highest shine to apply to a floor surface.

== Wet or dry usage ==
Concrete can be ground wet or dry, although dust extraction equipment needs to be used when grinding dry. To grind concrete dry, a grinding shroud can sourced for most angle grinder sizes, and floor grinders usually have them inbuilt. This provides the necessary vacuum attachment where one can connect a vacuum or HEPA filter-equipped vacuum to capture the fine dust produced when grinding dry. Of course concrete can also be ground wet in which case no vacuum is used.

An issue with dry grinding is that is can be time-consuming as is a slower method of keeping the diamond tools cutting and the fine dust particles quickly blocks up the HEPA filters in the vacuum. Continuously stopping to clean or replace filters can be time-consuming and this is where a dust separator can be beneficial. It is connected between the concrete grinder and the vacuum cleaner and works by capturing the larger particles of concrete in its drum, so only the fine particles reach the vacuum cleaner.

The benefit of grinding concrete wet is that it requires less attachments than when grinding dry. The water makes the dust particles heavy by turning them into a slurry or paste and prevents them from being dispersed into the air. This significantly reduces health risks from breathing in concrete dust.

== Dust precautions ==
When grinding concrete it is important to ensure steps are taken to mitigate exposure to concrete dust. According to the Cancer Council, approximately 230 people develop lung cancer each year due to past exposure to silica dust at work. Fine concrete dust contains silica which is very harmful to the lungs and can lead to silicosis so all effort should be made to avoid breathing concrete dust.

In construction, mining and other industrial type jobs that expose workers to dust and small particles, one should wear a respirator mask commonly known as a N95 mask, FFP2 mask, P2 Mask or KN95 mask to protect from inhaling concrete dust. This is because such a respiratory mask can block 94-95% of non-oil based particulates that are larger than 0.3 microns. Concrete Dust particles can be as small as 0.5 microns, which is larger than 0.3 microns, which means that a N95 respirator provides effective protection against concrete dust when fitted properly.

For green building methods many regulators have seen the benefit of using concrete grinders that are designed to finish concrete to a very stable wear surface, that can safely be used for many years as a floor or tabletop surface. These machines are sometimes powered by 240 volts or higher as they require motor power larger than 120 volts can supply. Some machine are powered by liquefied petroleum gas such as used on forklifts so that they can be run in well ventilated areas without a power cord, but these machines usually have fewer features that a fully electric unit.
