= Concrete densifier =

Chemical

A concrete densifier is a chemical hardener that penetrates the concrete surface, reacting with the material to form crystals that fill the pores and increase surface density. This process significantly improves the concrete's resistance to wear, dusting, and chemical damage.

It is a chemical applied to a concrete surface in order to fill pores, increasing surface density. Chemical densifiers are used on polished and non-polished concrete to reduce dusting and wear; on polished concrete surfaces densifiers help concrete take a better polish and make the surface less permeable to liquids so the slab does not require sealing.

== Polished concrete ==
Concrete polishing uses densifiers to achieve a better shine. Concrete floor polishing works by smoothing out peaks and valleys in the surface; if the concrete is not strong enough, this abrasion will remove micro-chunks that decrease the surface uniformity and quality of shine. Concrete surfaces face two major obstacles to polishing: bleed water and pores.

Excess water in newly placed concrete rises to the surface. This bleed water carries with it the finest aggregate and laitance, making it much softer than the slab's core. It also increases the water to cement ratio, which further weakens the surface. Densifiers address this problem by binding to available lime in a pozzolanic fashion, creating additional cementitious material and strengthening the surface. Densifier cannot improve weak/sub-standard concrete to satisfactory levels.

Concrete is by nature a porous material, with pores formed by water evaporation during curing. These pores interfere with surface uniformity, and make the slab more susceptible to staining from spilled liquids, including oil. The additional cementitious material formed by the densifier and lime tightens these pores for better surface hardness and durability. Most densifiers can react within 1-2 hours with concrete surface, however the chemical reaction with the calcium and free lime in the concrete will continue for up to 2 months after the application of it to the surface of the concrete.

Densifiers may use various carrying agents to accomplish the hardening process, potassium, sodium, lithium, or other agents.

== Non-polished concrete ==
Densifiers are used on non-polished concrete mainly to reduce dusting and improve stain resistance. They contain an active substituent or carrying agent alkali or alkaline earth metal silicate, such as lithium, sodium, magnesium or potassium silicate, with lithium silicate being preferred.
