= Diamond tool =

Cutting tool with diamond grains

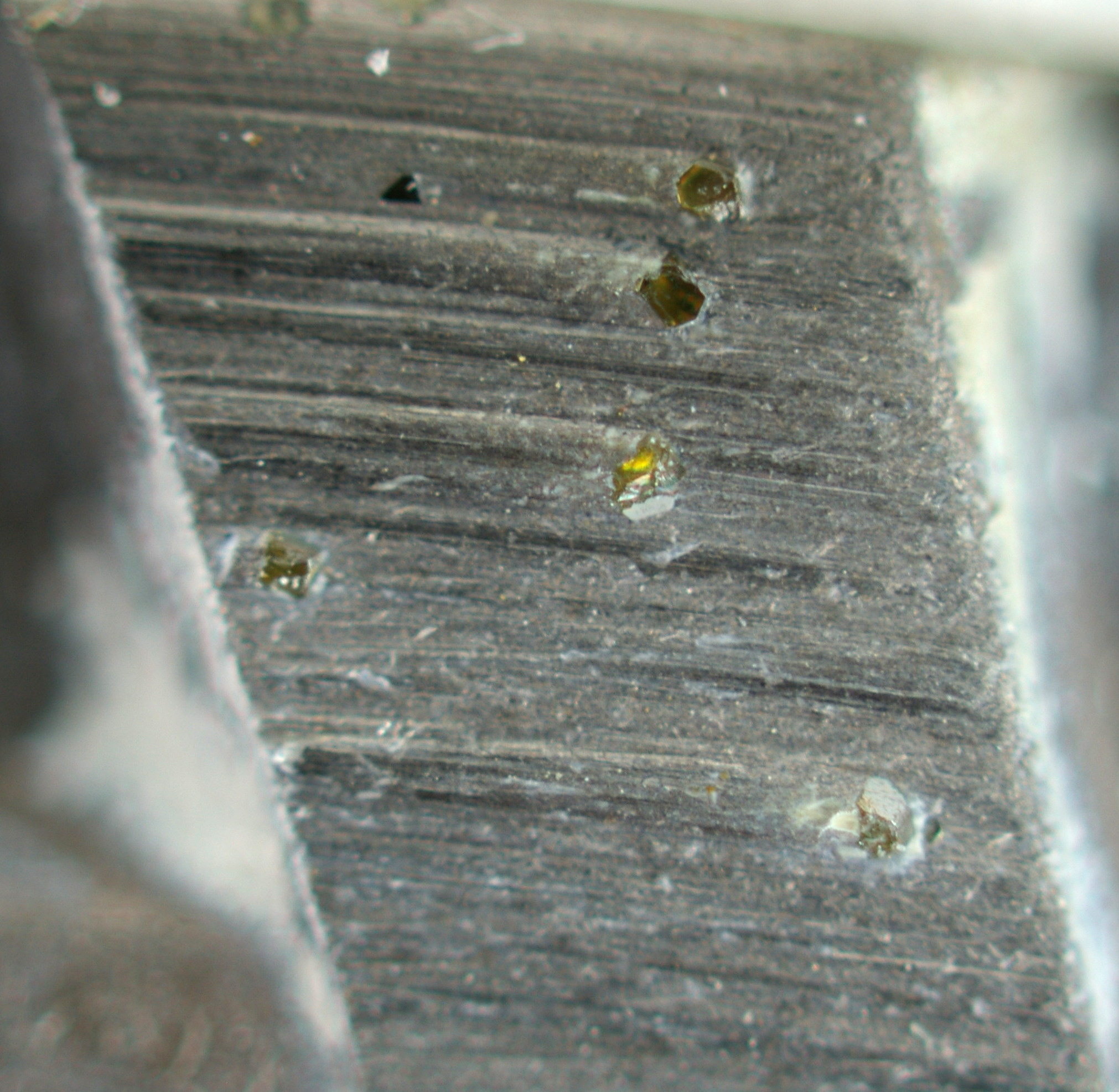
A close-up of a segment of a diamond saw blade

A diamond tool is a cutting tool with diamond grains fixed on the functional parts of the tool via a bonding material or another method. As diamond is a superhard material, diamond tools have many advantages as compared with tools made with common abrasives such as corundum and silicon carbide.

== History ==
In Natural History, Pliny wrote "When an adamas is successfully broken it disintegrates into splinters so small as to be scarcely visible. These are much sought after by engravers of gems and are inserted by them into iron tools because they make hollows in the hardest materials without difficulty."

== Advantages ==
Diamond is one of the hardest natural materials on earth; much harder than corundum and silicon carbide. Diamond also has high strength, good wear resistance, and a low friction coefficient. So when used as an abrasive, it has many obvious advantages over many other common abrasives.

=== Advantages of diamond grinding tools ===
Diamond can be used to make grinding tools, which have the following advantages:

- High grinding efficiency, Low grinding force: Less heat will be generated by the hole in the grinding process. This can decrease or avoid burns and cracks on the surface of the workpiece, and decrease the equipment's wear and energy consumption.
- High wear resistance: Diamond grinding tools' change in dimension is small. This can lead to good grinding quality and high grinding precision.
- Long lifespan, Long dressing period: This can greatly increase the work efficiency, and improve the workers' labor environment and decrease the product's labor intensity.
- Low comprehensive cost: The processing cost of each workpiece is lower.

== Categories ==
There are thousands of kinds of diamond tools. They can be categorized by their manufacturing methods and their uses.

=== Categories by manufacturing method ===
According to their manufacturing methods or bond types, diamond tools can be categorized to the following way:

- Metal-bonded diamond tools: The tool's bonding material is sintered metal containing diamond grit. The functional parts of the tool are usually diamond segments. These tools include metal-bonded diamond saw blades, diamond grinding cup wheels, diamond core drill bits, etc. For metal-bonded diamond tools, the bond is one of the prime factors when selecting which tool to use for cutting or grinding a specific material, depending on how hard or abrasive the material is. The bond used dictates the rate at which the metallic powders wear down and expose new diamond crystals at the surface, thereby maintaining an abrasive cutting surface. Different bond strengths are achieved by the alloy mix of metallic powders chosen and how much heat and pressure are applied to the sintered segment. The reference material has historically been cobalt, thanks to high diamond retention, ease of processing by hot pressing and adjustable wear rate by admixed bronze or tungstene carbide powders. Due to its high and unstable price and to environmental concerns, alternative systems have been developed based on iron-copper alloys or mixtures, with further metallic and non metallic additions.
- Resin-bonded diamond tools: The tools' bonding material is mainly resin powder. An example of this kind of tool is the resin-bonded diamond polishing pads used in the construction industry.
- Plated diamond tools: These tools are made by fixing the diamonds onto the tool's base via electroplating method or via CVD (Chemical Vapor Deposition) method. They can usually be made to good processing precision.
- Ceramic-bonded diamond tools: The tools' bonding material is usually glass and ceramic powder. This tool usually has the features of good chemical stability, small elastic deformation, but high brittleness, etc.
- Polycrystalline Diamond (PCD): They are normally made by sintering many micro-size single diamond crystals at high temperature and high pressure. PCD has good fracture toughness and good thermal stability, and is used in making geological drill bits.
- Polycrystalline Diamond Composite or Compacts (PDC): They are made by combining some layers of polycrystalline diamonds (PCD) with a layer of cemented carbide liner at high temperature and high pressure. PDC has the advantages of diamond's high wear resistance with carbide's good toughness.
- High-temperature brazed diamond tools: This tool is made by brazing a single layer of diamonds onto the tool via a solder at a temperature of over 900 °C. using vacuum brazing or atmosphere-protected brazing. This tool has several advantages: the solder can hold the diamonds very firmly, the single layer of diamonds' exposed height can be 70%–80% of their sizes, and the diamonds can be regularly arranged on the tool.

=== Categories by use ===
If categorized by use, there are diamond grinding tools, diamond cutting tools (e.g., diamond coated twist drill bits), diamond drilling tools, diamond sawing tools (e.g., diamond saw blades), diamond drawing dies, etc.

== Applications ==
=== Applicable materials ===
Diamond tools are suitable to process the following materials:

- Carbide alloy
- Hard or abrasive non-metallic materials, for example, stone, concrete, asphalt, glass, ceramics, gem stone and semiconductor materials.
- Non-ferrous metals such as aluminium, copper and their alloys, and some soft but tough materials such as rubber and resin.

As diamonds can react with Fe, Co, Ni, Cr, V under the high temperatures generated in the grinding processes, normally diamond tools are not suitable to process steels, including common steels and various tough alloy steels, while the other superhard tool, cubic boron nitride (CBN) tool, is suitable to process steels. The tools made with common abrasives (e.g. corundum and silicon carbide) can also do the task.

=== Applied domains ===
Diamond tools are used in the following domains:

- Geological or project exploration: Diamond geological drill bits, diamond oil drill bits and diamond thin-wall drill bits are often used. The main application of PCD drilling bits is in the oil and natural gas industries and the mining industry.
- Stone processing: Diamond circular saw blades, diamond gang saws, diamond band saws are used to saw marble, granite and other stone blocks. Diamond wire saws are used in stone quarries to exploit raw stone blocks. Shaped diamond tools are used to process stone to a particular shape. Resin-bonded diamond polishing pads are used to polish stone.
- Construction: Medium or small sized diamond saw blades, diamond core drill bits and some diamond grinding or polishing tools are often used in repairing roads, remodeling buildings, and processing building materials.
- Woodworking: Composite laminate flooring is widely used. It is wearable as stone. PCD circular saw blades, profiling cutter, twist drill bits and other diamond tools are used in its processing.
- Auto spare parts processing: PCD and PCBN cutting tools are used to meet the high efficiency and low deviation processing requirements in this domain.
- IT and home appliance products processing: High-precision super-thin diamond cutting wheels are used to cut silicon slices. Resin-bonded diamond grinding wheels are used to process ceramics in optical fiber industry.
- Engineering ceramics processing: Engineering ceramics are widely used in many industries. They have the properties of high toughness, high hardness, high-temperature resistance. High-toughness and durable diamond grinding wheels are developed to process them.
- Carbide tools and other mechanical tools processing: Diamond tools are used to gain high processing precision and efficiency.

Besides what are listed above, there are also other domains where diamond tools are applied, for example, in medicine, Venezuelan scientist Humberto Fernandez Moran invented the diamond knife for use in delicate surgeries in 1955.

Apart from its use as an abrasive due to its high hardness, diamond is also used to make other products for its many other good properties such as high heat-conductivity, low friction coefficient, high chemical stability, high resistivity and high optical performances. These applications include coatings on bearings and CDs, acting as lens and thermistors, making high-voltage switches and sensors, etc.

== Some examples of diamond tools ==
=== Diamond dressing tools ===
Diamond dressers consist of single-point or multipoint tools brazed to a steel shank, and used for the trueing and dressing of grinding wheels. The tools come in several types, including: grit impregnated, blade type, crown type, and disc type. The advantages of multipoint over single-point tools are:

1. The whole diamond can be used; in a single-point tool, when the point is blunt the diamond must be reset, and after few resettings the diamond is replaced.
2. Multipoint tools have higher accuracy, especially in form grinding, where blade types are used. Blades consist of elongated diamonds. The thickness is controlled and blades are available in thicknesses from 0.75 to 1.40 millimeters (0.030 to 0.055 in).
3. Grit-type tools are of a tough grade, and can be used for bench grinders.
4. Since small points are used, the diamonds have a cutting edge with natural points, unlike single-point tools, which have brutted points.
5. The cost of multipoint tools is lower, since smaller, less expensive diamonds are used.

=== PCD cutting tools ===
Polycrystalline diamond (PCD) is formed in a large High Temperature-High Pressure (HT-HP) press, as either a diamond wafer on a backing of carbide, or forming a "vein" of diamond within a carbide wafer or rod.

Most wafers are polished to a mirror finish, then cut with an electrical discharge machining (EDM) tool into smaller, workable segments that are then brazed onto the sawblade, reamer, drill, or other tool. Often they are EDM machined and/or ground an additional time to expose the vein of diamond along the cutting edge. These tools are mostly used for the machining of nonmetallic and nonferrous materials.

The grinding operation is combined with EDM for several reasons. For example, according to Modern Machine Shop, the combination allows a higher material removal rate and is therefore more cost effective. Also, the EDM process slightly affects the surface finish. Grinding is used on the affected area to provide a finer final surface. The Beijing Institute of Electro-Machining attributes a finer shaping and surface geometry to the combination of the two processes into one.

The process itself is accomplished by combining the two elements from each individual process into one grinding wheel. The diamond graphite wheel accomplishes the task of grinding, while the graphite ring around the existing wheel serves as the EDM portion. However, since diamond is not a conductive material, the bonding in the PCD work piece must be ample enough to provide the conductivity necessary for the EDG process to work.

Polycrystalline diamond tools are used extensively in automotive and aerospace industries. They are ideal for speed machining (9000 surface feet per minute or higher) in tough and abrasive aluminum alloys, and high-abrasion processes such as carbon-fiber drilling and ceramics. The diamond cutting edges make them last for extended periods before replacement is needed. High volume processes, tight tolerances, and highly abrasive processes are ideal for diamond tooling.

=== Polycrystalline diamond compacts ===
In the late 1970s, General Electric pioneered the technology of polycrystalline diamond compacts (PDCs) as a replacement for natural diamonds in drill bits. PDCs have been used to cut through crystalline rock surfaces for extended periods of time in lab environments, and these capabilities have now been implemented in harsh environments throughout the world.

As of August 2000, the U.S. Department of Energy claimed that nearly one-third of the total footage drilled worldwide is being drilled with PDC bits, with a claimed savings of nearly $100,000 per PDC bit as compared to roller-core bits.

=== Diamond paste and slurry ===
Diamond pastes are used for polishing materials that require a mirror finish. They are often used in metallurgical specimens, carbide dies, carbide seals, spectacle glass industry, and for polishing diamonds. Diamond paste is mainly used in industrial requirements for polishing and sharpening metal blades and other metal surfaces. The paste is not just to polish the metal blade but sharpen the cutting edge as well.

=== Diamond electroplated tools ===
Diamond powder deposited through electroplating is used to make files (including nail files) and in small grinding applications.

=== Single point diamond turning tools ===
Single point diamond turning (SPDT) utilizes a solid, flawless diamond as the cutting edge. The single crystalline diamond can be natural or synthetic, and is sharpened to the desired dimensions by mechanical grinding and polishing. The cutting edge of most diamond tools is sharp to tens of nanometers, making it very effective for cutting non-ferrous materials with high resolution. SPDT is a very accurate machining process, used to create finished aspherical and irregular optics without the need for further polishing after completion. The most accurate machine tool in the world, the LODTM, formerly at Lawrence Livermore National Laboratory, had a profile accuracy estimated at 28 nm, while most machines seek a roughness within that deviation.

SPDT is used for optics, for flat surfaces where both surface finish and unusually high dimensional accuracy are required, and when lapping would be uneconomical or impractical.

=== Diamond saw blades ===
For high-speed gas powered cut-off saws, walk-behind saws, handheld grinders, bridge saws, table saws, tile saws, and other types of saws.

Concave blade
For cutting curves in countertops to install sinks or sculpt statues.
Tuck pointers
Thick diamond blades for restoration, involving grinding and replacing mortar.
Crack chasers
Thick V-shaped diamond blades for repairing cracks in concrete.

=== Diamond tipped grinding cups ===
Typically used on hand grinders for grinding concrete or stone.

=== Diamond tipped core bit or holesaw ===
Hollow steel tube with diamond tipped segments for drilling holes through concrete walls in the construction industry, porcelain tiles or granite worktops in the domestic industry, or also used for sample core extractions in the mining industry.

=== PCD tool insert ===
Used in machine tools for machining ceramics and high speed aluminium.

=== PD tool insert ===
Used in turning centers for optics and precision surfaces.

=== Polishing pads ===
Pads with diamond crystals for polishing marble and other fine stone.

=== Diamond wire cutting ===
Wire with diamond crystals for cutting.

Some of the features of Diamond Wire Cutting are:
Non-percussive, fumeless and quiet
Smooth cutting face
Unlimited cutting depth
Horizontal, vertical and angled cutting of circular openings up to 2500mm diameter
Plunge cutting facility which allows blind and rebated openings to be formed
Remote controlled operation for increased safety

=== Diamond saw chain ===
For cutting stone, concrete and brick with a special chainsaw.

== See also ==
- Diamond
- Material properties of diamond
- Superhard material
- Diamond blade
