= Hole saw =

Cylindrical saw used to quickly cut holes

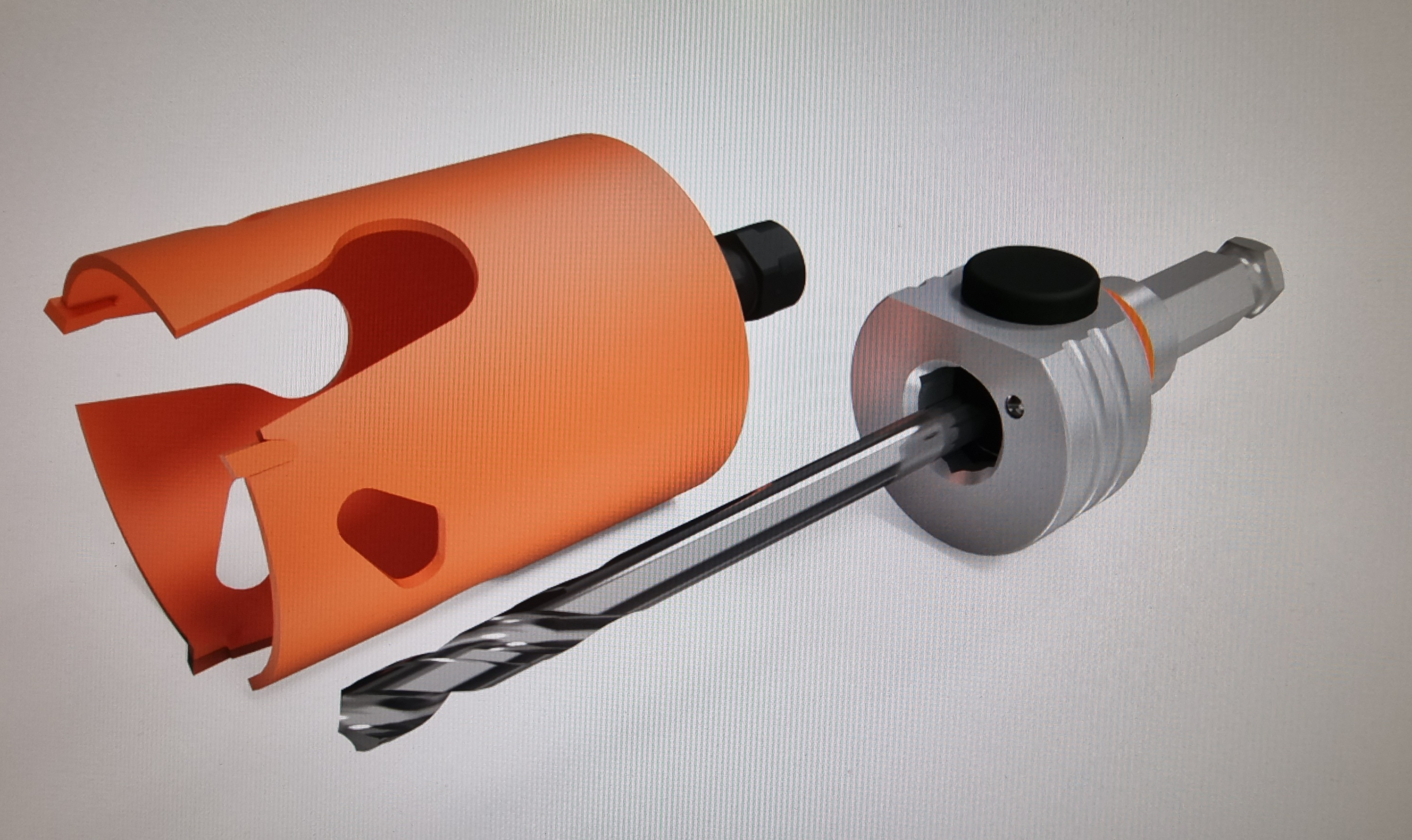
Tungsten carbide hole saw with arbor

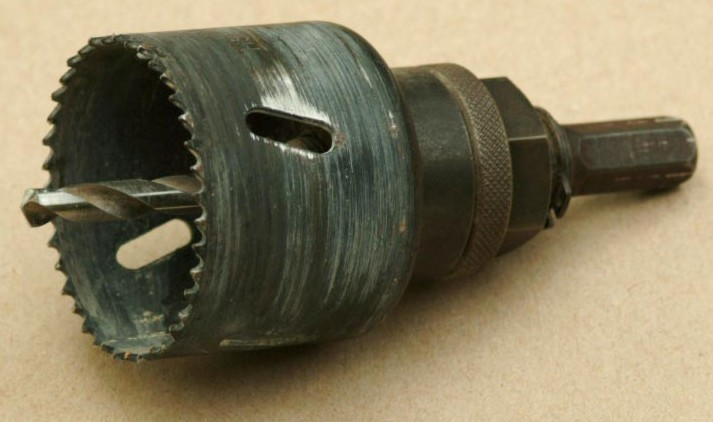
A 52 mm (2.0 in) hole saw with pilot bit

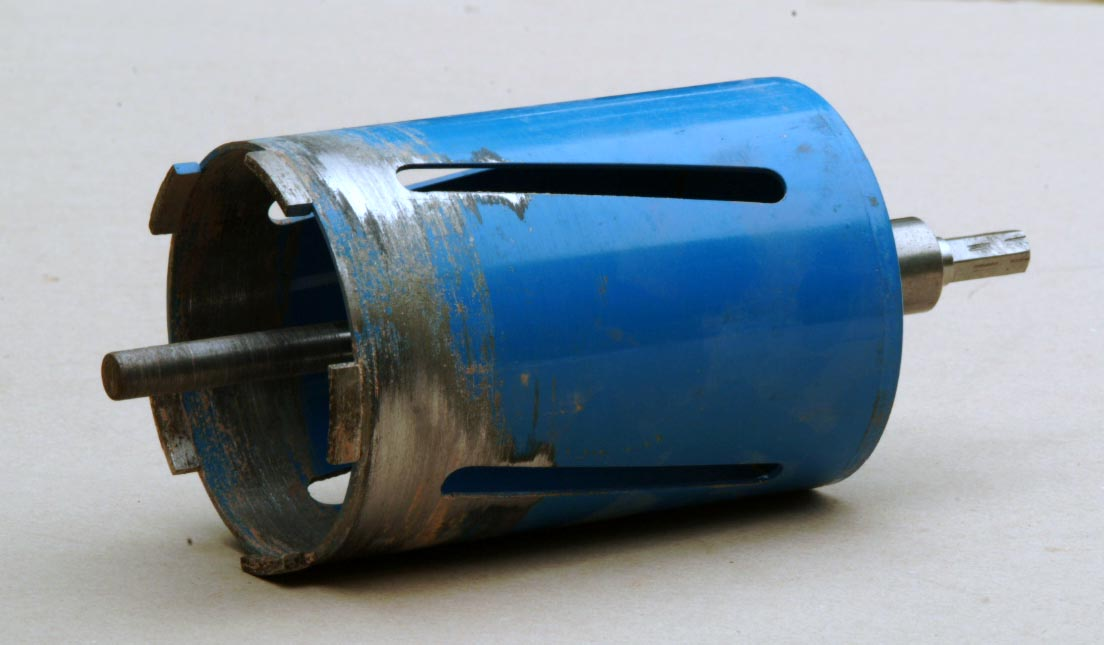
A 115 mm (4.5 in) diamond hole saw

A hole saw or holesaw, also known as a hole cutter, is a saw blade of annular (ring) shape, whose annular kerf creates a hole in the workpiece without having to cut up the core material. It is used in a drill. Hole saws typically have a pilot drill bit (arbor) at their center to keep the saw teeth from walking. The fact that a hole saw creates the hole without needing to cut up the core often makes it preferable to twist drills or spade drills for relatively large holes (especially those larger than 25 millimetres (1.0 inch). The same hole can be made faster and using less power.

The depth to which a hole saw can cut is limited by the depth of its cup-like shape. Most hole saws have a fairly short aspect ratio of diameter to depth, and they are used to cut through relatively thin workpieces. However, longer aspect ratios are available for applications that warrant them. Common hole saw depths are 38, 45 and 60 mm and for drilling through e.g. (angled-) rooftop constructions also a depth 165 and 300 mm is possible.

Cutting with a hole saw is analogous to some machining operations, called trepanning in the trade, that swing a cutter analogous to a fly cutter in order to achieve a similar result of annular kerf and intact core.

== Construction ==
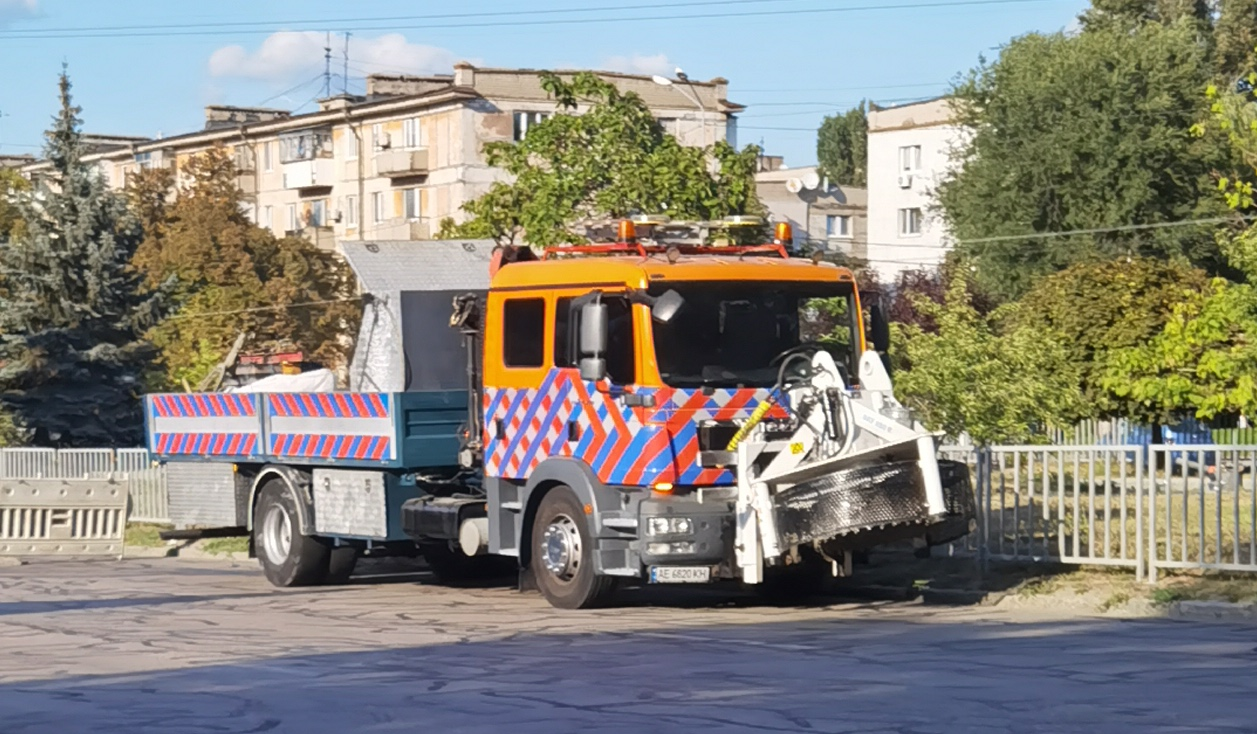
Truck with big hole saw of manhole cutter in Dnipro, Ukraine

The saw consists of a metal cylinder, usually steel, mounted on an arbor. The cutting edge either has saw teeth formed in it or industrial diamonds embedded in it. The arbor can carry a drill bit to bore a centering hole. After the first few millimeters of cut, the centering mechanism may no longer be needed, although it will help the bit to bore without wandering in a deep hole. The sloping slots in the cylinder wall help carry the dust out. The kerf of the cut is designed to be slightly larger than the diameter of the rest of the hole saw so that it does not get jammed in the hole.

Holes saws for use with portable drills are commonly available in diameters from 6 to 130 mm, or in the US, ¼ to 6 inches. The only limit on the length of the cylinder, and thus depth of the hole, is the need to remove the bit from the hole to clear dust. A 300 mm (12 in) cylinder length is not uncommon, although shorter bits are usual. By breaking the core off from time to time and using a shank extension, a diamond core drill can drill to depths many times its length.

Saw teeth are used for most materials, such as wood, plastic, soft plaster, and metal. Diamond hole saws are used to bore holes in brick, concrete, glass, and stone.

== Types ==
=== Adjustable ===
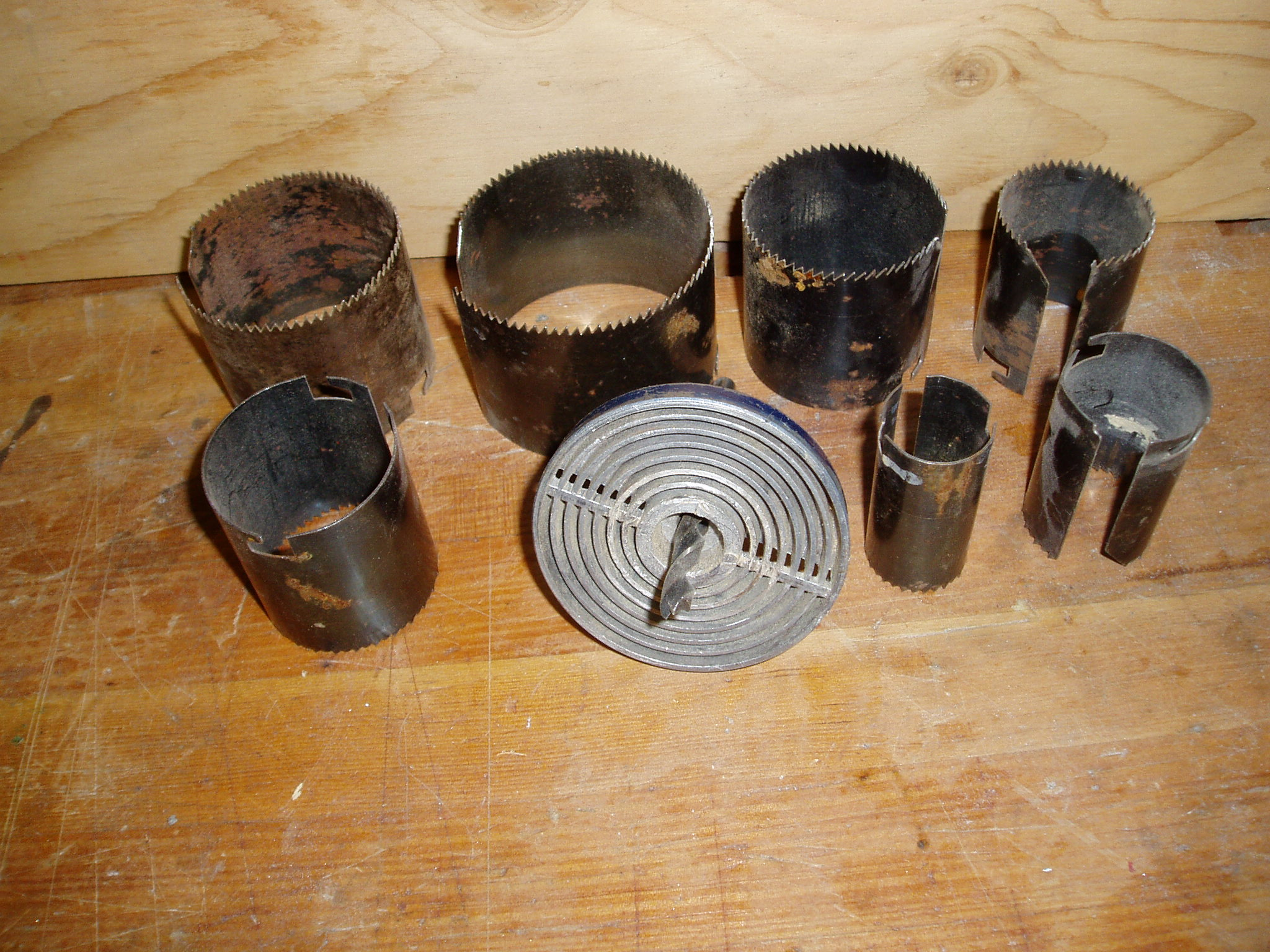
Adjustable hole saw

An adjustable hole saw consists of a number of thin metal saw blade-like strips, and a flat disc with a large number of grooves in one side and a shank on the other. By snapping the blades into different grooves on the disc, a hole saw of a wide variety of sizes can be constructed.

=== Circle cutter ===
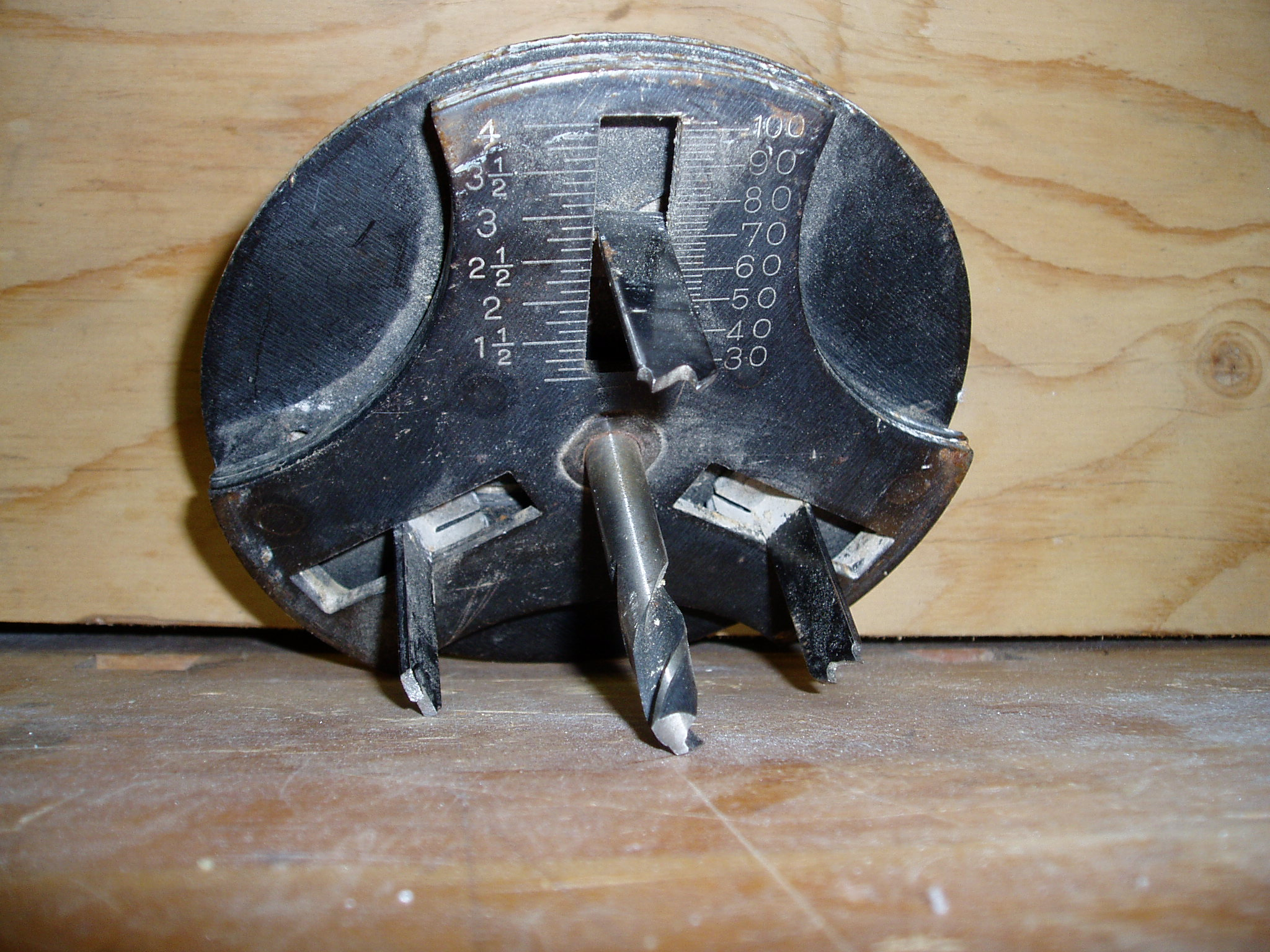
Hole saw circle cutter

Another type of adjustable hole saw, also called a circle cutter, is formed by having one, two, or three adjustable teeth on a platform with a pilot bit. To cut out a hole of any size, the teeth need only be adjusted to the proper position. This type is available in sizes up to 300 mm (1 ft) and larger, and can be used to accurately cut large circles.

== Advantages and disadvantages ==
The main advantage over conventional drill bits is the hole saw's efficiency, because very little of the total material being removed is actually cut, which ultimately reduces the overall power requirement. Another advantage over drill bits is the wider size capability. For example, a 100 millimetres (3.9 inches) hole would require a huge twist drill or spade drill, unable to be properly driven by a pistol-grip drill or benchtop drill press; but it can be cut with a hole saw with relative ease.

Some disadvantages include:

- The portable drill used must be capable of producing considerable torque at low speed
- They tend to bind if choked with dust, or if allowed to wander away from the central axis of the planned hole
- The kick-back from a powerful drill may be severe under some conditions, and long side-handles should be used, preferably with two operators for very large holes.
- The core plug often binds inside the hole saw, and often must be pried out after each hole is cut. Sometimes the prying is quite difficult.
- Sometimes the core plug will twist apart mid-cut, creating a condition where the core inside the hole saw spins on the yet-uncut portion of the core still in the workpiece. This tends to stop the cutting action of the saw, and if the workpiece is wood or plastic, the friction will start to singe it, creating a burning smell and heating up the hole saw. The twisted-off core must then be pried out of the hole saw before the cutting can continue.

== Diamond drilling ==
Diamond hole saws are also called diamond core drill bits. Laser welded diamond core drill bits can be used in wet and dry drilling, but not all materials to be drilled are suitable for dry drilling. Very hard materials like reinforced concrete normally should be drilled with water, otherwise the excessive heat generated during the drilling process may cause the diamonds on the core bit to become blunt, and then lead to poor drilling performance.

The bond materials welded diamond core drill bits usually are specially adjusted to fit the wet and dry drillings respectively. This can make the core bits perform better in drilling speed and/or lifespan.

Diamond hole saws will drill through tile, porcelain tiles, granite, marble, concrete, metals and any lapidary material.
