= Polished concrete =

Concrete which has been mechanically ground, honed, and polished

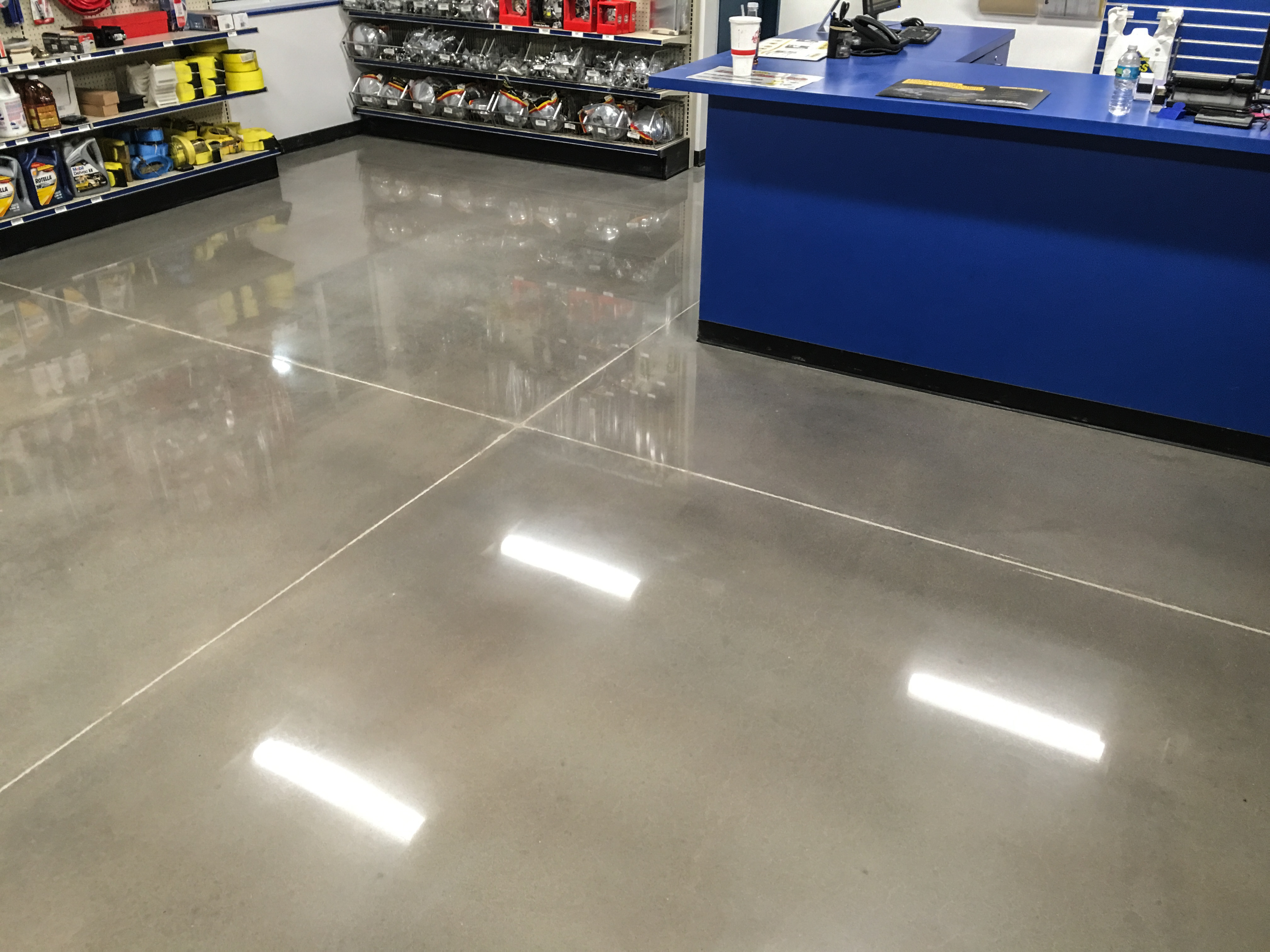
Concrete floor polished with 1800 grit

Polished concrete is a concrete floor which has been mechanically ground, honed and polished with bonded abrasives in order to achieve a desired level of sheen or gloss.

The Polished Concrete Process

Concrete polishing begins with floor preparation. During this process, the floor is inspected and cleared to remove all unnecessary materials that can damage both the floor and the grinding machines. Floor inspection also includes hardness testing. Before a floor can be polished, it must have a hardness reading of 4,000 psi or higher for best results. A reading below this measure means the floor is soft and can crack under pressure. The next step is the initial grinding. In this step, low grit diamonds (e.g. 16- to 20-grit) are used to grind down all uneven surface until the floor is flat.

The next step is patching. Normally, all concrete floors have cracks. Patching ensures that all cracks, pinholes, and micropits are covered with grout before the concrete polishing process continues. After patching comes floor hardening. This step is also called densifying. Densifiers make the concrete surface hard enough for grinding and polishing; a minimum of 32 to 40 mpa (megapascal) must be achieved before the concrete surface can undergo grinding. Densifying solutions also seal the floor from problems like rebar expansion, mildew, and mold.

Once the floor is hard enough, the next step is honing. This process is needed to refine the hardened surface using finer abrasives (e.g. 200- to 400-grit resin). After honing, the next step is polishing. Here, the floor is polished with much finer grit in order to achieve the desired sheen level, such as matte, satin, semi-gloss, and high-gloss. In a matte finish, the objects reflected on the floor have a hazy appearance. In a satin finish, the reflection of objects have a low-luster appearance. A semi-gloss sheen would have easily-identifiable reflections. Side and overhead lighting will also be visible. A high-gloss sheen will have highly identifiable reflections of images. When viewed from different angles, the floor will appear to be wet.

Polished Concrete Densifiers

A concrete densifier is a solution used to penetrate into the concrete and create a chemical reaction to harden and dust-proof the surface. During concrete polishing, the surface is processed through a series of steps (in general a minimum of four grinding steps of processing is considered polished concrete) utilizing progressively finer grits of industrial diamonds bonded in metal, hybrid or resin to make diamond polishing pads.

Under certain circumstances polished concrete may be LEED approved.

Historically, concrete was not considered fully polished before reaching a 1600 grit, with any grinding below 1600 grit being categorized as a honed floor, and final finishes normally targeting the 1600 or 3000+ grit level. However, modern industry standards, such as those established by the Concrete Polishing Council (CPC) of the American Society of Concrete Contractors (ASCC), classify finishes into four distinct levels of gloss based on the grit utilized.

A Level 1 (flat or ground) finish stops below a 100-grit resin bond, resulting in a hazy appearance with minimal reflection. Level 2 (satin or honed) stops at a 400-grit resin bond, yielding a low-luster matte finish. True polishing begins at Level 3 (semi-polished), which uses an 800-grit or higher diamond abrasive to achieve sharp light reflectivity. Finally, a Level 4 (highly polished) finish utilizes 1500 to 3000-grit resin bonds or high-speed burnishers. Processing concrete up to the 1500 or 3000-grit level adds substantial depth and richness to the concrete's color, producing a mirror-like clarity and a luxurious appearance that can rival polished marble.

Dyes designed for concrete polishing are often applied to add color to polished concrete, alongside other decorative options such as scoring, creating radial lines, grids, bands, borders, and custom designs.

== History ==
Polished lime mortar was discovered in the city of Jericho, in the valley of the River Jordan. According to the Bible, Jericho fell in 1200 BC. Researchers have since discovered several layers of concrete from earlier settlements. Among the layers was a polished screed floor.

== New or retrofit ==
In simple terms, the process of polishing concrete is similar to sanding wood. Heavy-duty polishing machines, for example concrete grinder, are used to gradually grind down surfaces to the desired degree of shine and smoothness. The closest equivalent example would be polished granite or marble.

=== New floors ===
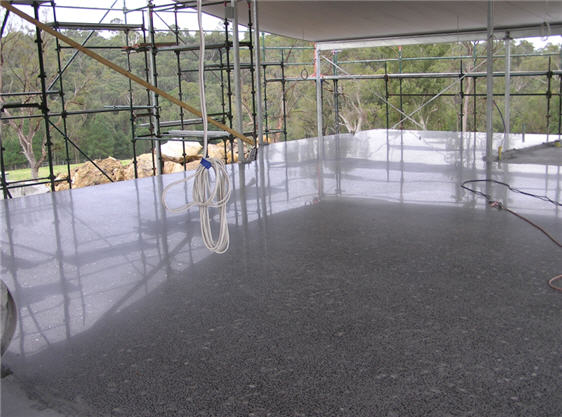
Newly polished concrete slab

The mix design of the concrete should be 3500 psi or higher. The concrete should be poured full depth to take advantage of the concrete's full structural strength, and also help to prevent cracks. The concrete should always be professionally finished with power trowels and cured with water for seven days. Polishing should not begin until the concrete is fully cured (generally 28 days). The concrete slab can contain decorative aggregates to create many different aesthetic appearances, see Terazzo. The aggregates are often sized 8 – 20 mm, but almost anything can be used. According to the Global Concrete Polishing Institute, a FF (floor flatness) level of 50 or greater is desired to facilitate the polishing process. During the finishing phase, any decorative aggregates such as seashells, glass chips or even metal car parts can be dropped into the surface of the concrete.

=== Retrofit floors ===
Retrofit floors can be done in different ways depending on the conditions of the concrete. If the existing concrete is in good condition the surface can be polished to just about any standard. If the existing floor slab is in poor condition, it can be cut, or ground and the natural aggregate can be featured as the "exposure level". If the existing surface is in very poor condition a topping slab with a minimum thickness of 50 mm (2 inches) can be added on top of the existing slab.

== Diamond-polished concrete process ==
A diamond polished concrete floor is time-consuming. Six to twelve steps of grinding may be needed. The general rule is to start the initial grinding with a coarse 30/60-grit diamond and finish with a 1600- or 3000+ grit diamond, depending on the exposure level of aggregate and gloss level required. The polishing process begins with a 50-grit diamond resin pad instead of a metal segment. When using the resin pads the steps may be 100, then 200, 400, 800, 1600 and finally 3000+ grit. Throughout the process, a densifier is used to harden the concrete surface, which allows the concrete to be polished. A number of densifiers can be used; these consist of lithium, potassium or sodium silicates. In some cases, a fine grout is also used to fill in any holes, cracks or imperfections that were exposed from the initial coarse grinding step. The concrete can be also finished with a natural-look impregnating polish guard, which penetrates 2–5mm inside the pores of the concrete to prevent staining from oils and spills. It is breathable as opposed to a sealer that does not allow vapor transmission.

== "Hybrid" Concrete Polish ==
This system is not considered to be real polished concrete, as there is little physical refinement of the concrete slab. However, it does provide a similar look to polished concrete, so may be appropriate in some areas. Typically, this system is referred to as a "half polish" as generally the surface is only processed through three steps of grinding (half the processing steps of a true polished concrete floor). The surface is densified, so the advantages of the densifier are inherited, then a concrete sealer or a high buildup of a concrete guard is used to create a shine. The "shine" is topical and generally wears easily, requiring high maintenance and reapplication of the material. While there is some level of refinement to the surface, the topical (chemical spray or rolled on) solution will wear off and need to be replaced depending upon the level of floor traffic. Grouting and patching may be required to fill any voids, holes, cracks or imperfections.

== Grind-and-seal polished concrete process ==
This system is not considered to be polished concrete as there is very little physical refinement of the concrete slab. However, it does provide a similar look to polished concrete and may be appropriate in small spaces with little expected foot traffic or wear on the slab. While there may be some level of surface preparation this is a topical (chemical spray or rolled on) solution and will wear off and need to be replaced depending on floor traffic. Grouting and patching may be required to fill any voids, holes, cracks or imperfections. The surface is then cleaned and prepared for the application of either a gloss or matte surface coating or an impregnating enhancing sealer.

== Process ==
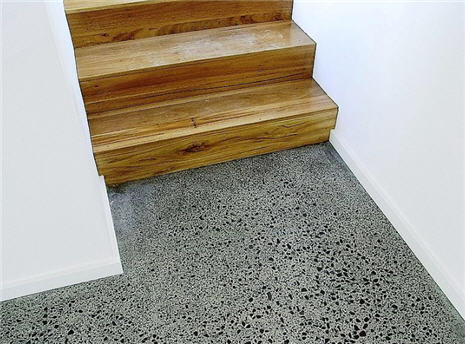
New polished concrete floor

Process involved in polishing concrete:

1. The concrete floor is cut with a variety of diamond abrasives of the concrete slab. Polishing can be done wet or dry. However, in the United States, new OSHA regulations on crystalline silica and protecting skilled trades in the concrete, masonry, and brick industries are encouraging the development of wet refinement systems or the use of industrial vacuums.
2. A densifier can be applied once the concrete is opened up and, in a condition, to readily accept the chemical. The step at which the densifier is applied is determined by hydration of the slab. There are many types of densifiers including, sodium, potassium, lithium, magnesium fluorosilicate and colloidal.
3. The densifier is allowed to dry and cure until proper hardness has been achieved, followed by one or more abrasive cuts, which will refine the floor to the desired level of reflectivity.

== Distinctness of Image (DOI) gloss ==
Level	Name	DISTINCTNESS-OF-IMAGE (DOI) GLOSS	IMAGE CLARITY VALUE, %
1	Flat (Ground)	Images of objects being reflected have a flat appearance	0 - 9
2	Satin (Honed)	Images of objects being reflected have a matte appearance.	10 - 39
3	Polished	Images of objects being reflected do not have a sharp and crisp appearance but can be easily identified.	40 - 69
4	Highly Polished	Images of objects being reflected have a sharp and crisp appearance as would be seen in a near-mirror like reflection. May require grouting.	70 - 100

== Advantages ==
Polished concrete may be considered a form of sustainable design flooring, if less material is used than in comparable types of flooring.

Polished concrete floors have the following advantages:

- low-maintenance – polished concrete is easily maintained with the use of clean water or a neutral pH cleaner. The application of wax may dull the finish.
- non slippery – due to high coefficient of friction
- minimizes dust mite and allergen problems; does not allow mold growth
- ambient light – reflective polished concrete reduces lighting needs and can improve natural lighting

LEED 2009 standards contain guidelines for using polished concrete flooring to qualify for LEED credits.

== Disadvantages ==
Service life depends on the surface quality and the usage. If the usage is heavy, the polished concrete floor will degrade. Cementitous concrete is not acid-resistant.

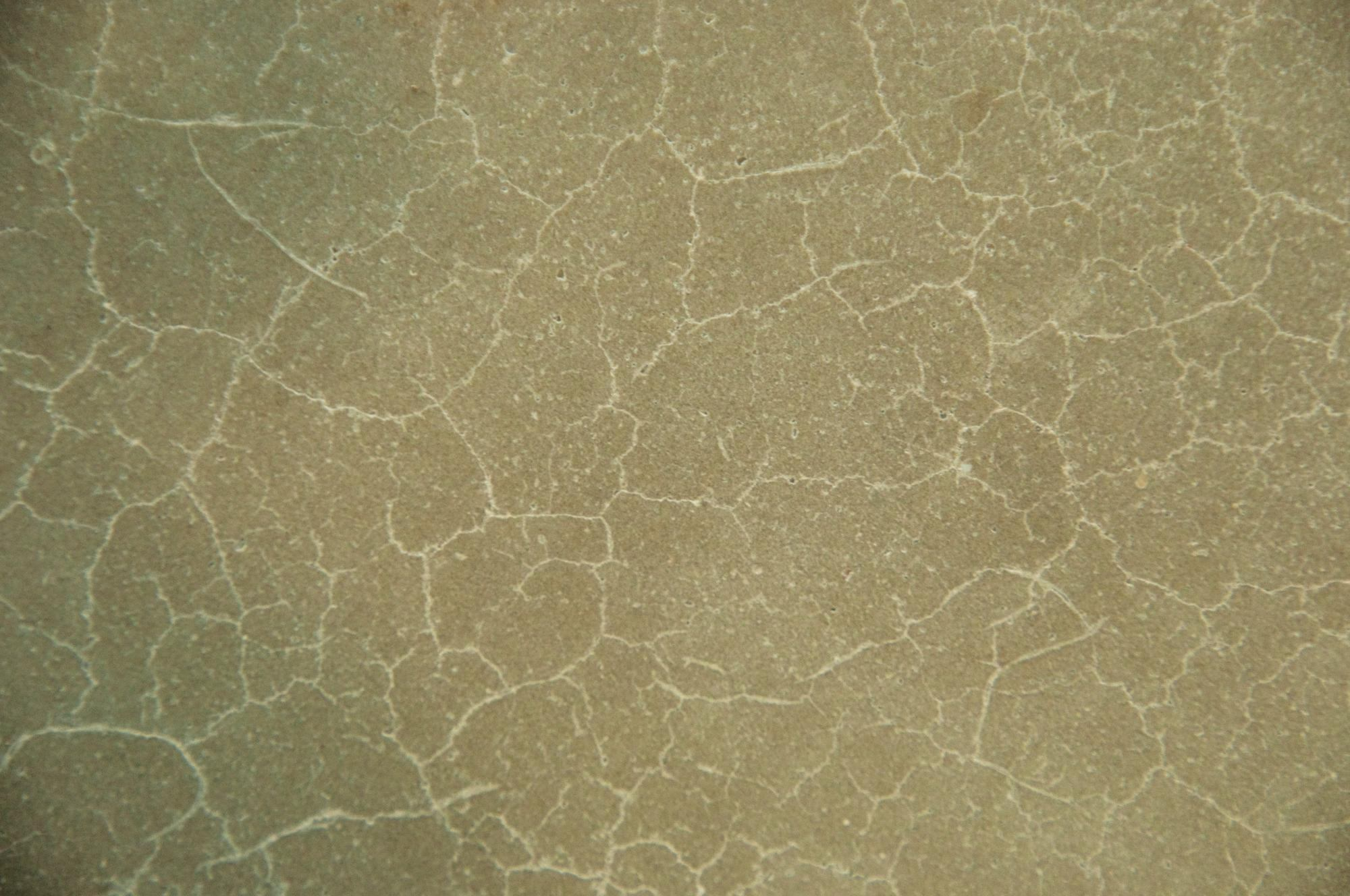
Network of fine hairline cracks

== Damage and Degradation ==
Even though polished concrete doesn't peel off like Epoxy and PU floors, damage may happen:

1. Development of rough patches
2. Development of fine hairline cracks
3. Rough patches may develop into potholes

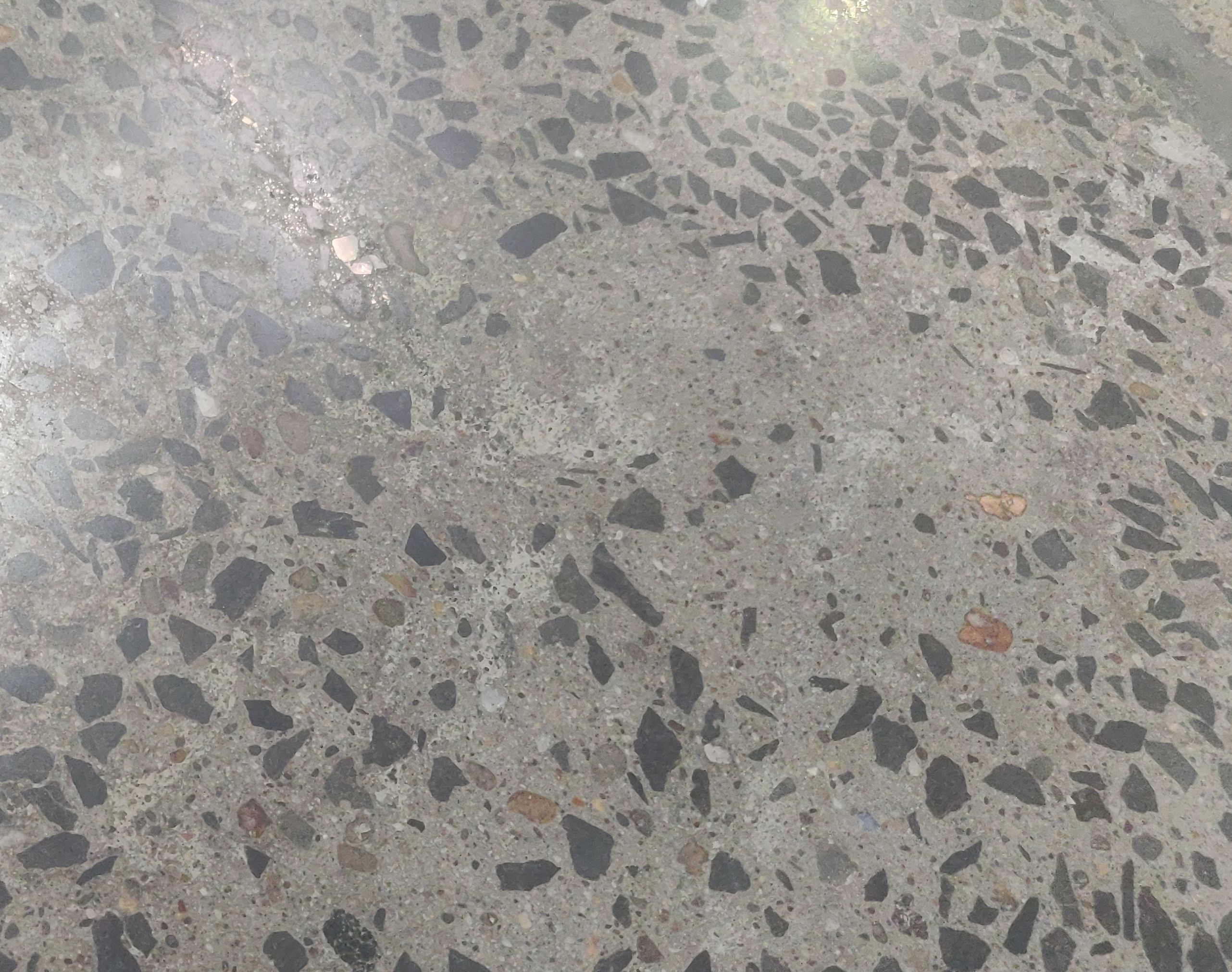
Initial Rough and whitish patches

== See also ==
- LEED
- USGBC
- Terrazzo
- Concrete sealer
