= Diamond blade =

Saw blade enhanced with diamond grit

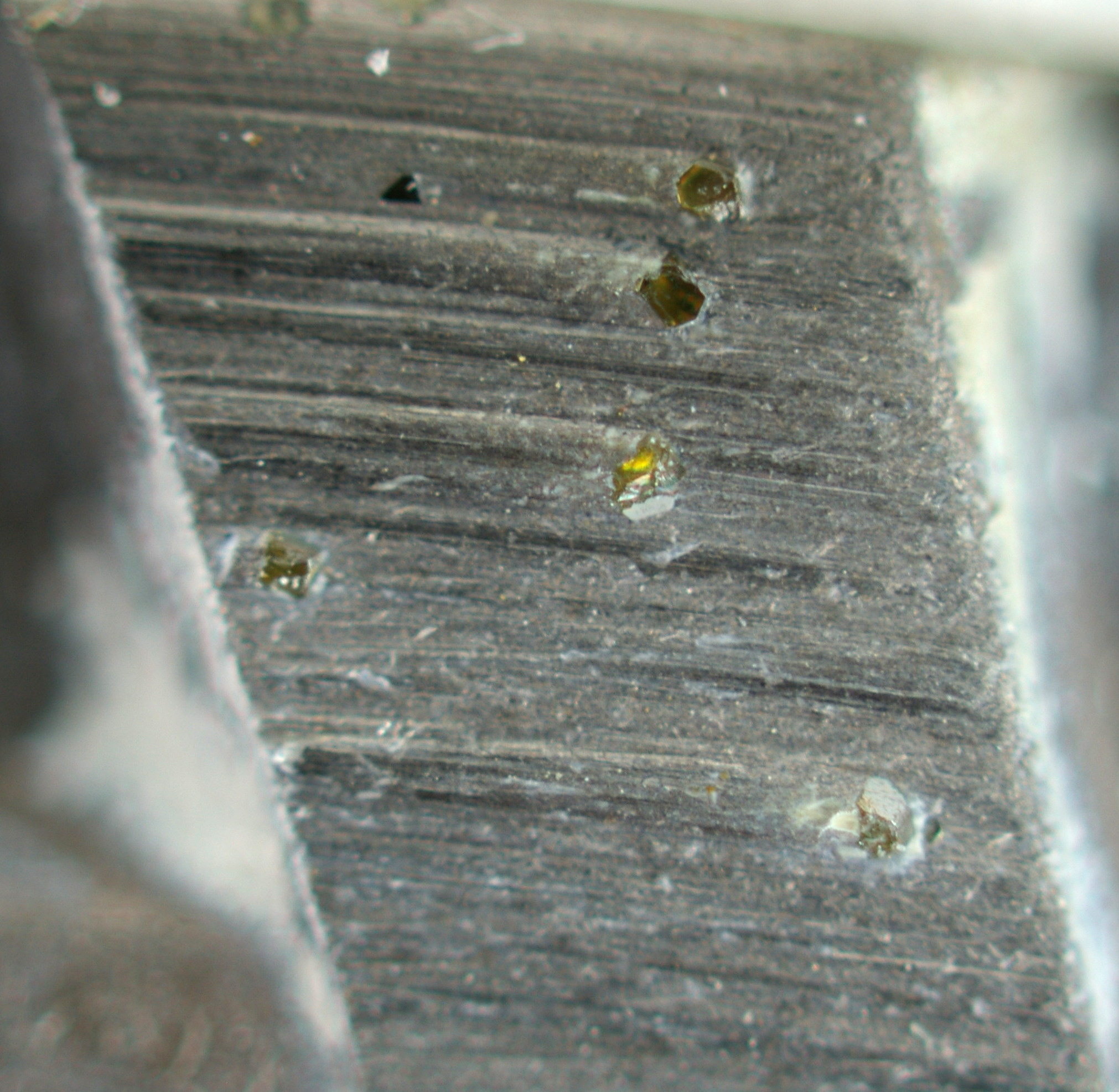
A close-up of a diamond blade, showing worn metal behind the diamonds on the blade

A diamond blade is a saw blade which has diamonds fixed on its edge for cutting hard or abrasive materials. There are many types of diamond blade, and they have many uses, including cutting stone, concrete, asphalt, bricks, coal balls, glass, and ceramics in the construction industry; cutting semiconductor materials in the semiconductor industry; and cutting gemstones, including diamonds, in the gem industry.

== Types ==
Diamond blades are available in different shapes:

- Circular diamond saw blades are the most widely used type of diamond blade.
- A diamond gang saw blade is a long steel plate with diamond segments welded onto it. Normally, tens or hundreds of diamond gang saw blades are used together to saw raw stone blocks.
- A diamond band saw blade is a flexible closed steel band with diamonds fixed (often by electroplating) on one edge of the band.

Diamond blades designed for specific uses include marble, granite, concrete, asphalt, masonry, and gem-cutting blades. General purpose blades are also available.

== Manufacturing methods ==
=== Electroplating ===
Blades using diamonds embedded in a metal coating, typically of nickel electroplated onto a steel blade base, can be made to be very thin—blades can be tens of micrometres thick, for use in precise cuttings.

=== Vacuum brazing ===
Vacuum brazed diamond saw blades are manufactured by brazing synthetic diamond particles to the outside edge of the circular saw blade in a vacuum brazing furnace. All of the diamond particles are fully exposed and fastened on the exterior cutting edge of the blade instead of being embedded within a metal-diamond mixture. Depending on the manufacturer's recommended blade application, vacuum brazed blades will cut a wide variety of material including concrete, masonry, steel, various irons, plastic, tile, wood and glass.

Finer synthetic diamond grits will reduce the chipping of tile and burring of steel and provide a smoother finish. Larger diamond grits will provide a higher cutting speed, but will be more likely to cause chipping, burring, or cracking. Fire departments sometimes use vacuum brazed saw blades and require blades to be made with a very large diamond grit, to tear through material quickly. An intermediate grit size is used by the production industry.

=== Sintering ===
Sintered metal-bonded diamond blades are the most common type of blade. These blades consist of a steel core (the base is steel plate, unlike that of the wires used in diamond wire saws) and diamond segments, which are made by combining synthetic diamond crystals with metal powder and then sintering them. The diamond segments are also known as the "cutting teeth" of the blade.

The steel core can vary in design. Some cores have spaces (known as gullets) between segments to provide cooling and slurry removal, while others have a single continuous rim for smoother cutting. The type of core that can be used depends on the type of materials that the diamond blade is designed to cut.

Generally, there are three types of sintered metal-bonded diamond blades according to their manufacturing methods: wholly sintered diamond blades, silver brazed diamond blades and laser welded diamond blades.

A wholly sintered diamond blade is made by putting the steel core, together with the diamonds and the metal bond materials, into a mold and then sintering it in a sintering furnace equipment. Consequently, the diameter of wholly sintered diamond blades is not very large, normally not more than 400 millimetres (16 in). Because it is participating in the sintering process, the steel core cannot be quenched, so the hardness and strength of the core are not very high. This means that these types of diamond blade may deform in high-load and high-intensity cutting processes and can exhibit low cutting efficiency.

Silver brazed and laser welded diamond blades do not have this weakness because their diamond segments and steel core are treated separately. The steel core can be quenched and processed with other heat treatments, so its hardness and strength can be high, meaning that the blade can be used in high-load and high-intensity cutting processes with high cutting efficiency and a smaller degree of deformation.

Silver brazed diamond blades' diamond segments are brazed to the steel core using a silver solder. These blades can only be used in wet cuttings. If they are used in dry cuttings, the silver solder may melt and the segments can break from the steel core and become a serious safety hazard. A laser melts and combines the metal of the diamond segment and the steel core creating a stronger weld, which can hold the segments even in high temperatures, meaning that laser welded diamond blades can be used to cut many types of stone without water cooling. However, when cutting very hard or abrasive materials, e.g., concrete containing reinforcing rebar, laser welded diamond blades should also be used with adequate water. Otherwise, it is possible for the diamond segment itself to break or the steel core below the segment to wear and break, creating serious safety hazards.

== Application of sintered metal-bonded diamond blades ==
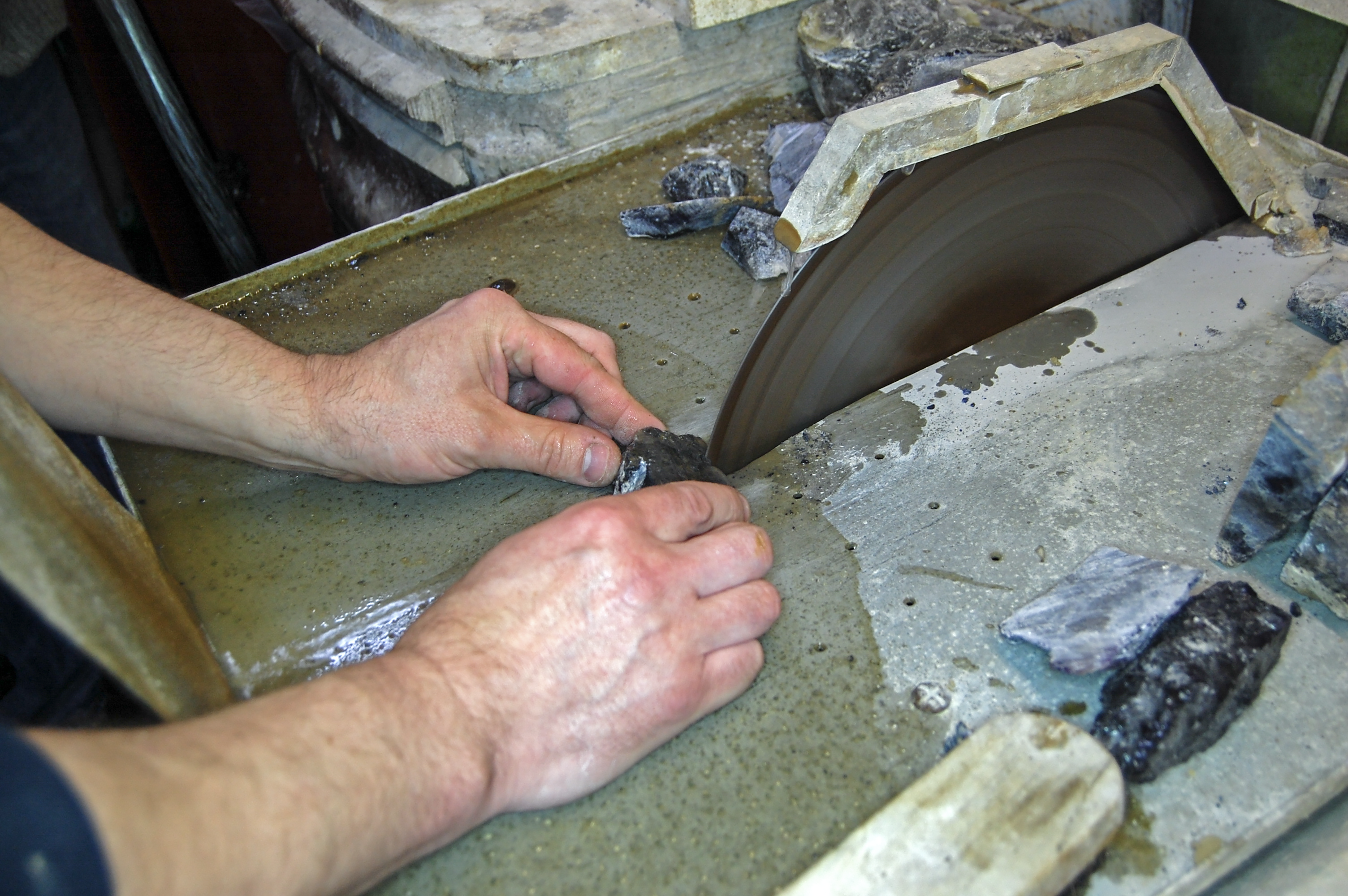
Using a diamond blade to saw a gemstone.

A diamond blade grinds, rather than cuts, through material. Blades typically have rectangular teeth (segments) which contain diamond crystals embedded throughout the segment for grinding through very hard materials.

The bond is a term used for the softness or hardness of the powder metal being used to form the segments. The powdered metals hold the diamonds in place. The bond controls the rate at which the diamond segments wear down allowing new diamonds to become exposed at the surface to continue grinding with a "sharp" edge. An important step in choosing a blade is to match the bond to the specific material to be cut. Additional factors to consider are the type and power of the equipment to be used and the availability of water. Harder materials need a softer bonded segment to allow for continuous diamond exposure. Softer materials like asphalt or freshly poured concrete can use a harder segment to resist the increased wear that softer, abrasive materials create. In addition, the diamonds' grit (size), toughness, and concentration should also match the nature of the material to be sawed. For example, when hard materials are cut, the diamonds should be smaller.

There are other factors that should be considered when choosing a diamond blade for a particular application. These include the type (manufacturing method) of the blade, the availability of water in the cutting process, the horsepower of the saw, and the acceptable level of noise created by the saw. For example, if the horsepower of a saw machine is large, the diamond concentration of the diamond blade should be higher, or the bond should be harder. Higher diamond concentration will decrease the impact on each single diamond in working, while a harder bond will hold the diamonds more firmly.

== Cutting with or without water ==
Many blades are designed to operate either wet or dry. However, diamond tools and blades work better when wet, and dry cutting should be limited to situations in which water cannot or should not be used. Water will prevent the blade from overheating, greatly reduce the amount of harmful dust created by cutting, remove the slurry from the cut, and extend the life of the blade, since diamond is unable to withstand the forces involved at the elevated temperatures involved in dry cutting ceramic and abrasive materials, and will be subject to rapid tool wear and possible failure.

When water cannot be used (in, for example, electrical saws), measures should be taken to ensure that the operator does not inhale the dust created by the process, which can cause silicosis, a serious lung disease. When dry cutting, the blade should be allowed to cool off periodically. Cooling can be increased by allowing the blade to spin freely out of the cut. The OSHA has strict regulations regarding silica dust and requires a N95 NIOSH-approved respirator in work sites where dangerous amounts of silica dust are present.
