= Space Age =

Historical period started in 1957

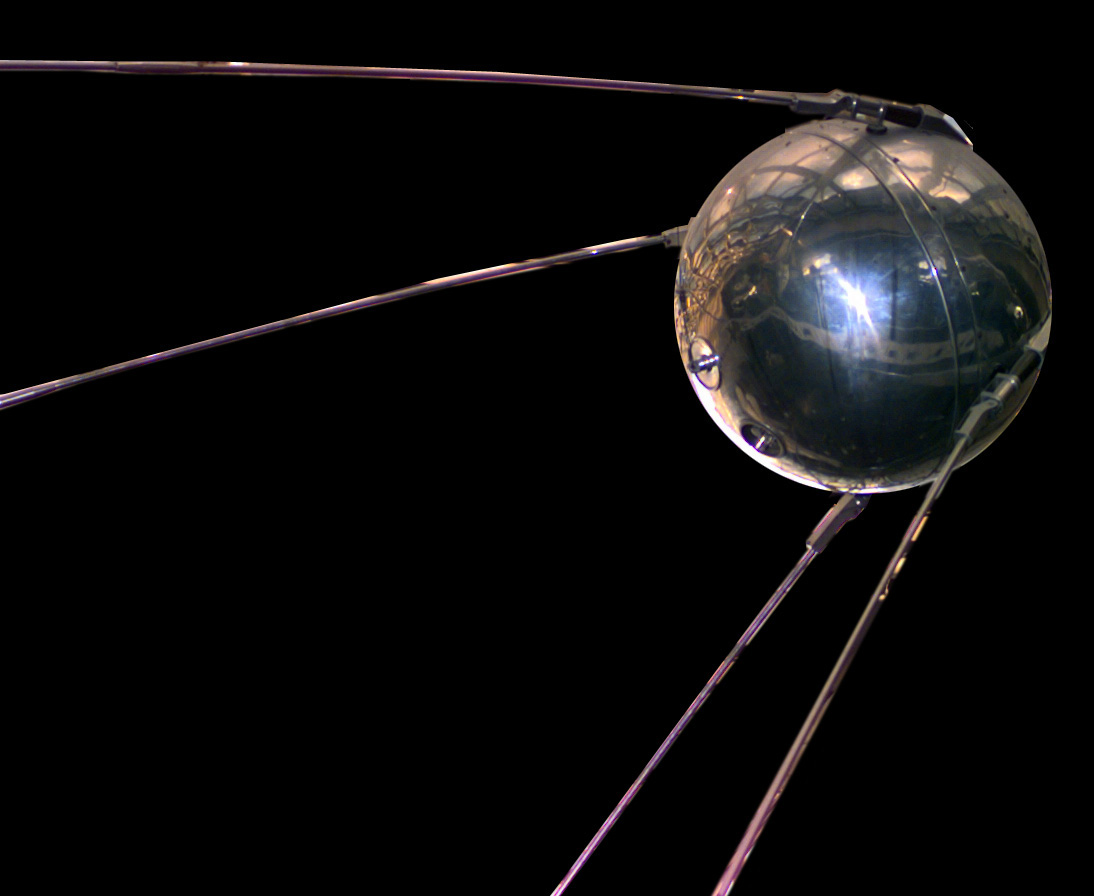
- The launch of the Sputnik 1 satellite marked the start of the Space Age.
- Audio recording of Sputnik's radio transmission by NASA The signals of Sputnik 1 continued for 22 days.

- Video of Neil Armstrong and the first step on the Moon. Apollo 11, being the first spaceflight mission that landed humans on the Moon, is one of the most significant moments in the Space Age.
- That's one small step ...

The Space Age is a period encompassing the activities related to the Space Race, space exploration, space technology, and the cultural developments influenced by these events, beginning with the launch of Sputnik 1 on October 4, 1957, and ending with the completion of the Apollo-Soyuz Test Project that marked the conclusion of the Space Race in 1975.

The Space Age is characterized by changes in emphasis on particular areas of space exploration and applications. Initially, the United States and the Soviet Union invested unprecedented amounts of resources in breaking records and being first to meet milestones in crewed and uncrewed exploration. The United States established the National Aeronautics and Space Administration (NASA) and the USSR established the Kosmicheskaya programma SSSR to meet these goals. This period of competition gave way to cooperation between those nations and an emphasis on scientific research and commercial applications of space-based technology.

Eventually other nations became spacefaring. They formed organizations such as the European Space Agency (ESA), the Japan Aerospace Exploration Agency (JAXA), the Indian Space Research Organization (ISRO), and the China National Space Administration (CNSA). When the USSR dissolved, the Russian Federation continued its program as Roscosmos.

In the early 2020s, some journalists have used the phrase "New Space Age" in reference to a resurgence of innovation and public interest in space exploration as well as commercial applications of low Earth orbit (LEO) and more distant destinations. New developments include the participation of billionaires in crewed space travel, including space tourism and interplanetary travel.

== Periodization ==
The periodization of the Space Age can differ substantially, with some differentiating between a first Space Age and a second Space Age, which are separated at the turn of the 1980s/1990s.

== Periods ==
=== Foundational developments to suborbital spaceflights ===
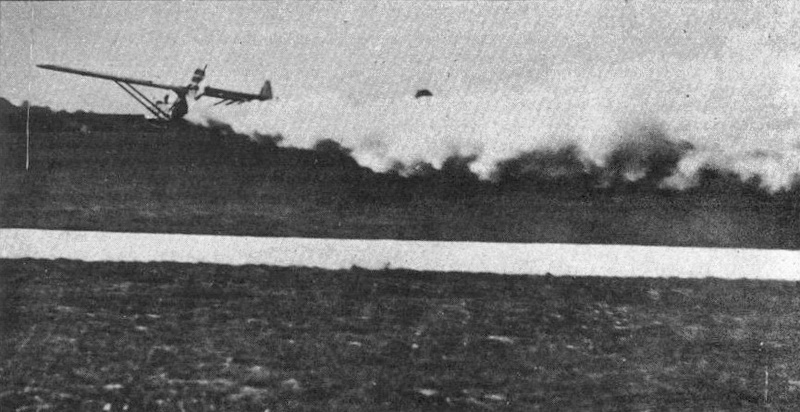
Opel RAK.1 – world's first public flight of a crewed rocket-powered plane on September 30, 1929

Some vehicles reached suborbital space much earlier than the launch of Sputnik. In June 1944, a German V-2 rocket became the first manmade object to enter space, albeit only briefly. In March 1926 American rocket pioneer Robert H. Goddard launched the world's first liquid fuel rocket but it did not reach outer space.

Since the Germans undertook the sub-orbital V-2 rocket flight in secrecy, it was not initially public knowledge. Also, the German launches, as well as the subsequent sounding rocket tests performed in both the United States and the Soviet Union during the late 1940s and early 1950s, were not considered significant enough to define the start of the space age because they did not reach orbit. A rocket powerful enough to reach orbit could also be used as an intercontinental ballistic missile that could deliver a warhead to any location on Earth. Some commentators claim this is why the orbital standard is commonly used to define when the space age began.

=== 1957 to 1970s/1980s: Establishment and Space Race ===
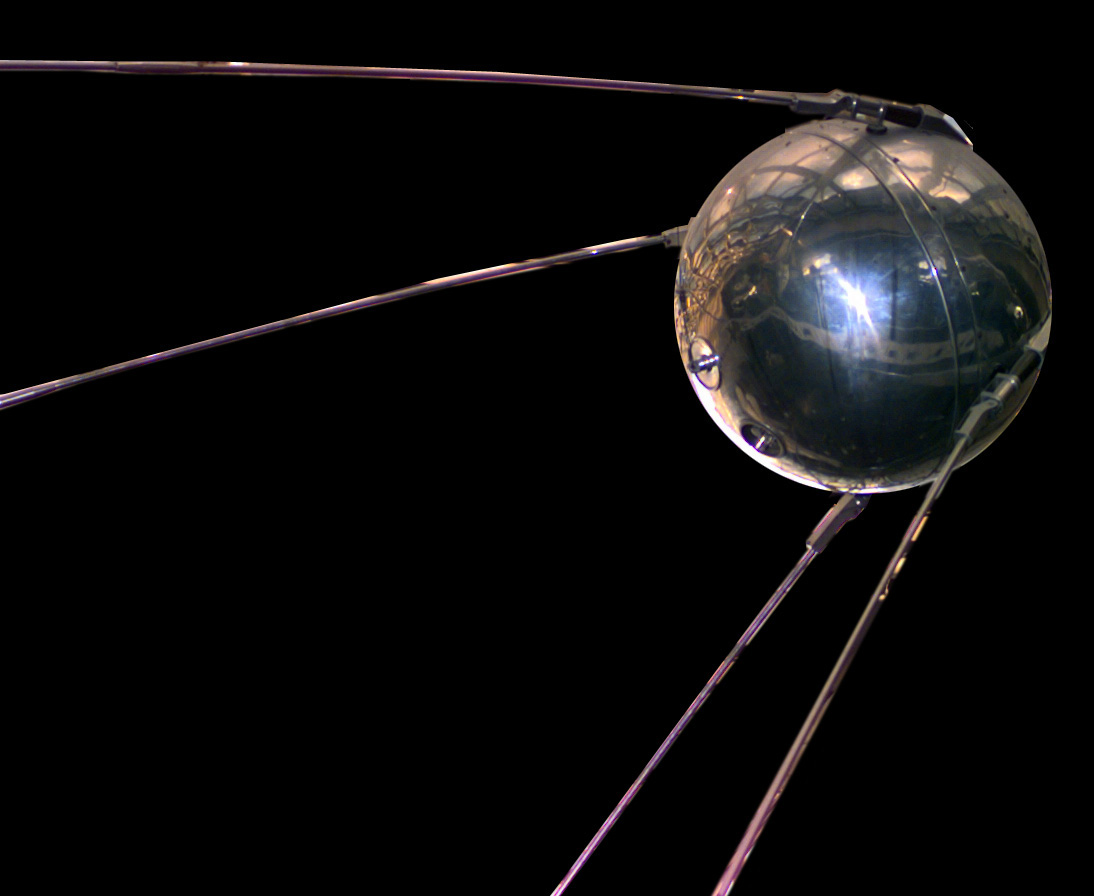
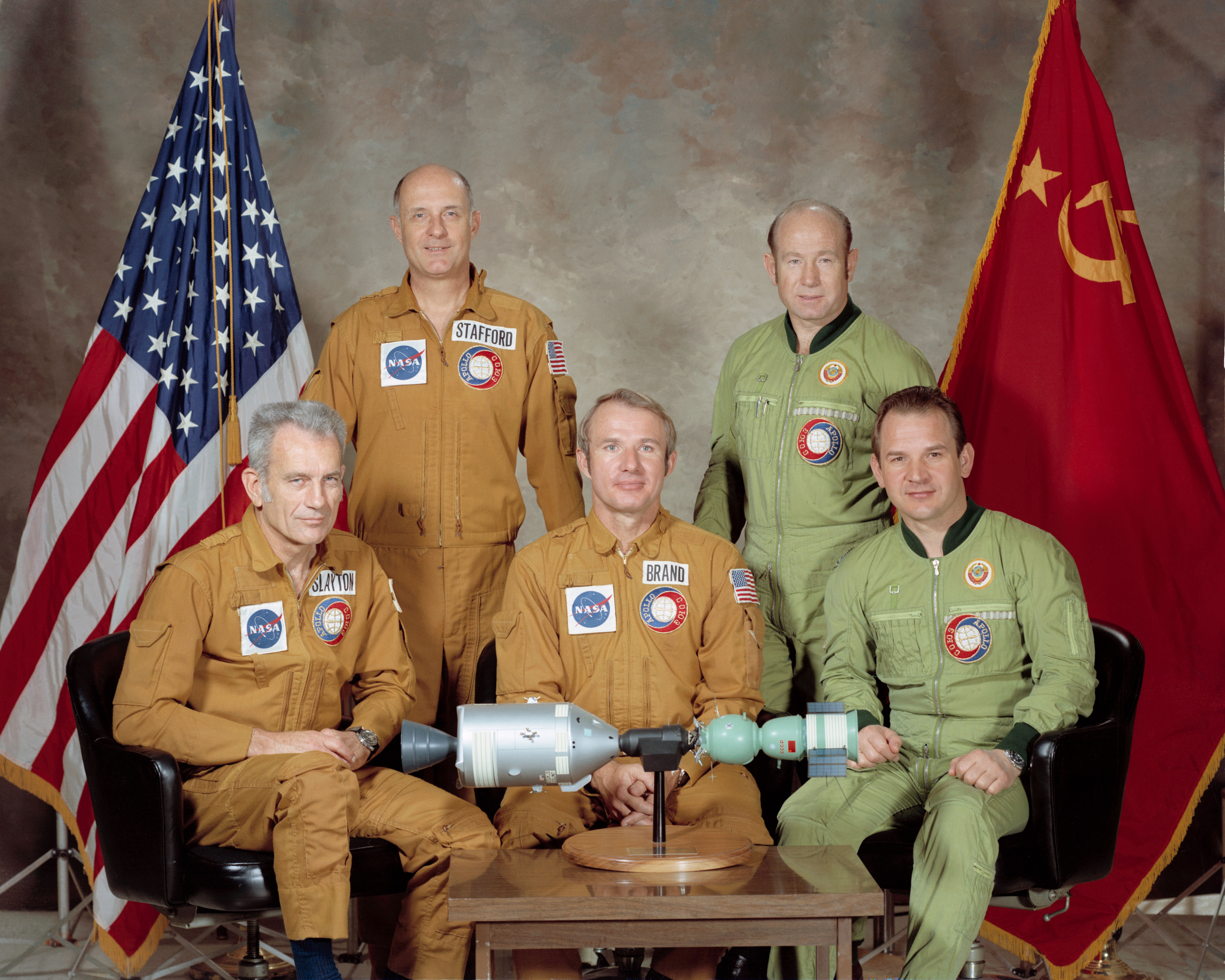
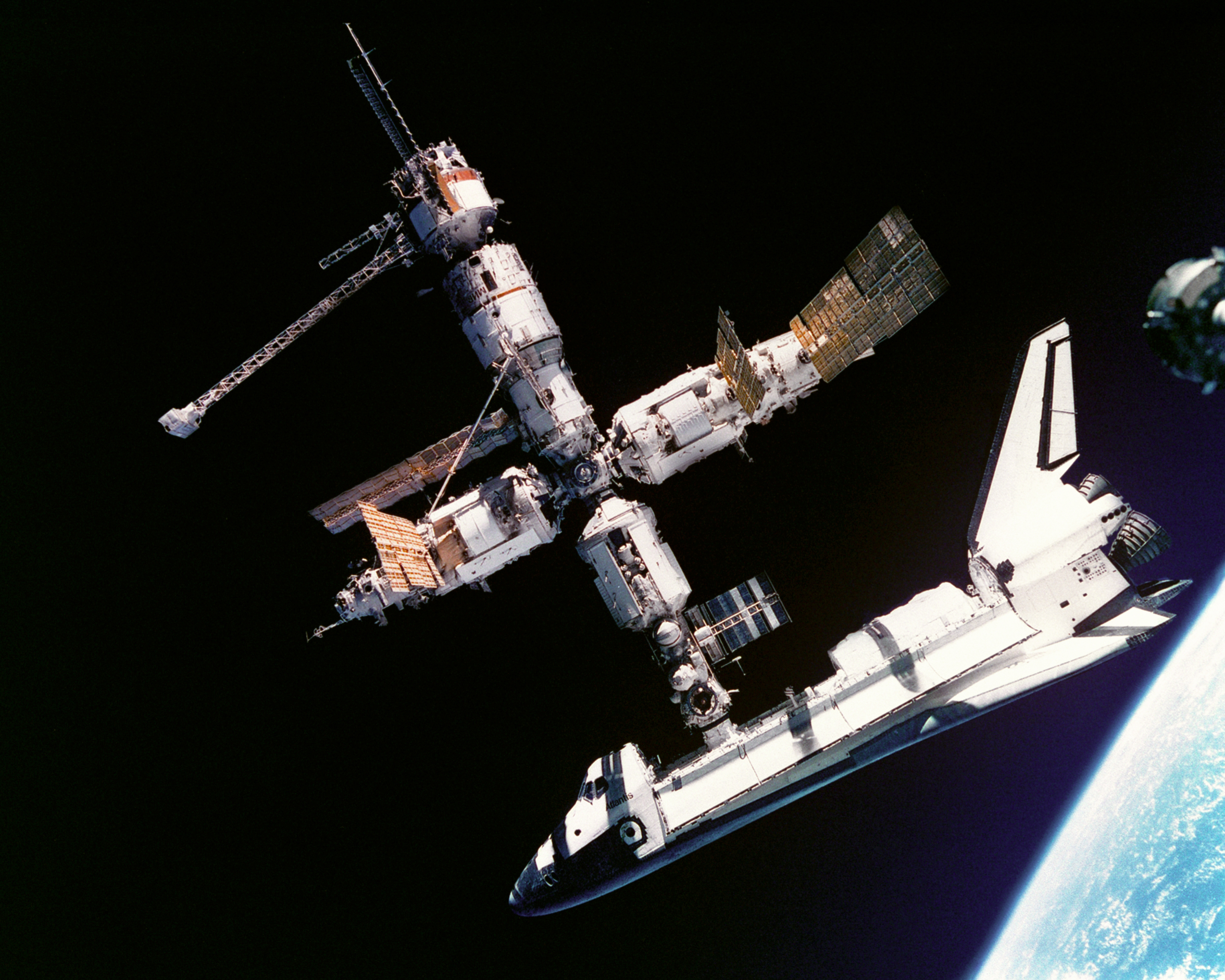
Clockwise, from top left: Model of the Sputnik 1 satellite; Apollo 11 astronaut Buzz Aldrin on the Moon; US Space Shuttle Atlantis docked to the Soviet Mir Earth orbital space station; US and Soviet crews of Apollo–Soyuz, first joint rendezvous and docking mission

The Space Race was the first era of the Space Age. It was a race between the United States and the Soviet Union which began with the Soviet Union's October 4, 1957, launch of Earth's first artificial satellite Sputnik 1 during the International Geophysical Year. Weighing 83.6 kg (184.3 lb) and orbiting the Earth once every 98 minutes. The race resulted in rapid advances in rocketry, materials science, and other areas. One underlying motivation for the space race was military. The two nations were also in a nuclear arms race following the Second World War. Both nations used German missile technology and scientists from its missile program. The advantages in aviation and rocketry required for delivery systems were seen as necessary for national security and political superiority.

The Cold War competition between the United States and the Soviet Union is one reason the space age happened when it did. Since then, the space age has continued for the generation of scientific knowledge, innovation and creation of markets, inspiration, and agreements between the space-faring nations. Other reasons for the continuation of the space age are defending Earth from hazardous objects like asteroids and comets.

Much of the technology developed for space applications has been spun off and found additional uses, such as memory foam. In 1958 the United States launched its first satellite, Explorer 1. The same year President Dwight D. Eisenhower created the National Aeronautics and Space Administration, commonly known as NASA.

Prior to the first attempted human spaceflight, various animals were flown into outer space to identify potential detrimental effects of high g-forces in takeoff and landing, microgravity, and radiation exposure at high altitudes.

The Space Race reached its peak with the Apollo program that captured the imagination of much of the world's population. From 1961 to 1964, NASA's budget was increased by almost 500 percent, and the lunar landing program eventually involved some 34,000 NASA employees and 375,000 employees of industrial and university contractors. The Soviet Union proceeded tentatively with its own lunar landing program which it did not publicly acknowledge, partly due to internal debate over its necessity and the untimely death (in January 1966) of Sergey Korolev, chief engineer of the Soviet space program.

The landing of Apollo 11 was watched by over 500 million people around the world and is widely recognized as one of the defining moments of the 20th century. Since then, public attention has largely moved to other areas.

The last major leap in the USSR–USA Space Race was the Skylab and Salyut programs, which established the first space stations for the U.S. and USSR in Earth orbit following termination of both countries' moon programs.

At the conclusion of the Apollo program, crewed flights from the United States were rare, then ended while the shuttle program was getting ready to kick into gear, and the space race had been over since the Apollo–Soyuz test project of 1975, started a period of U.S.–Soviet co-operation. The Soviet Union continued using the Soyuz spacecraft.

The shuttle program restored spaceflight to the U.S. following the Skylab program, but the Space Shuttle Challenger disaster in 1986 marked a significant decline in crewed Shuttle launches. Following the disaster, NASA grounded all Shuttles for safety concerns until 1988. During the 1990s funding for space-related programs fell sharply as the remaining structures of the now-dissolved Soviet Union disintegrated and NASA no longer had any direct competition, engaging rather in more substantial cooperation like the Shuttle–Mir program and its follow-up the International Space Station.

=== Diversification ===
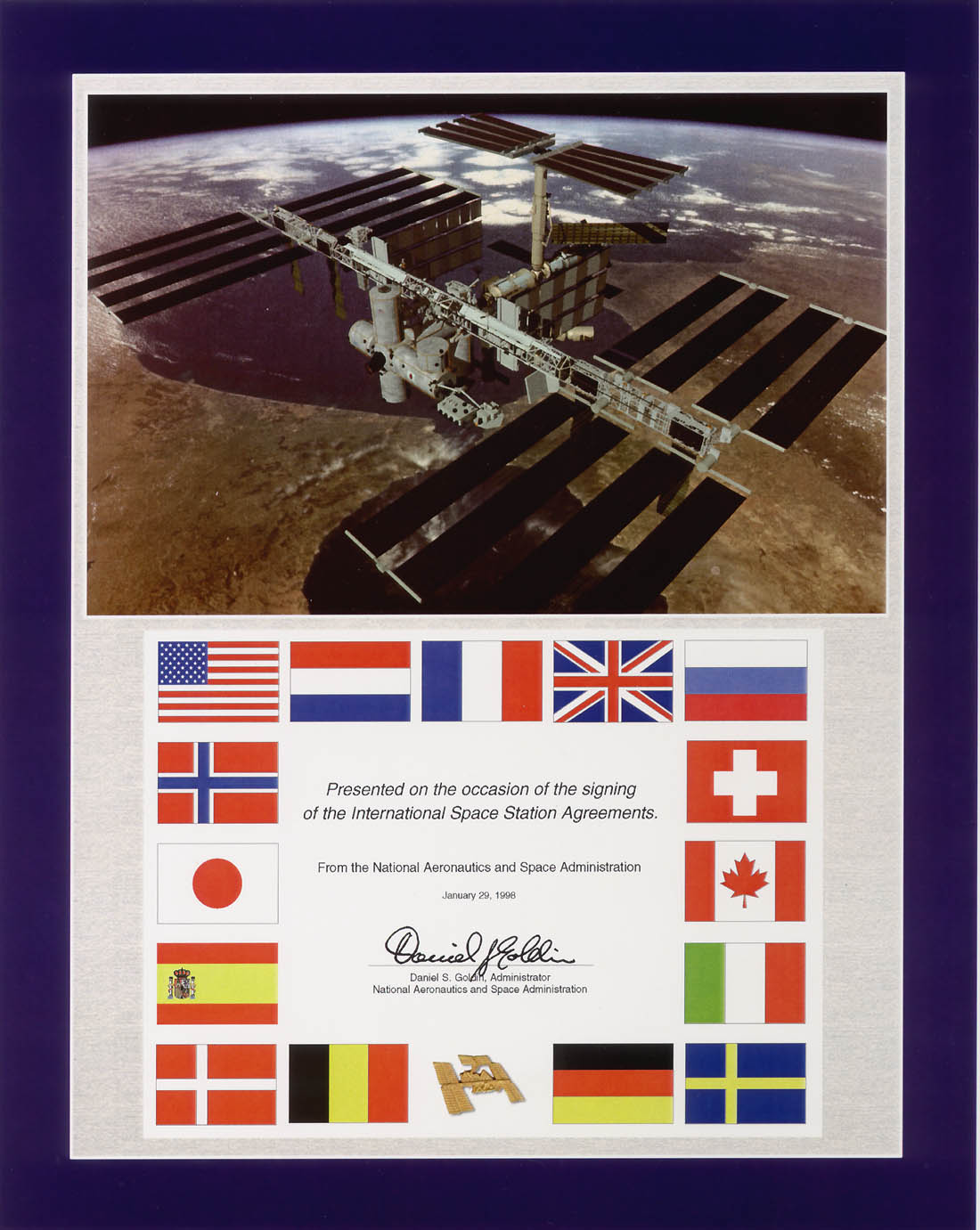
A commemorative plaque honouring the Space Station Intergovernmental Agreement (IGA) for the International Space Station, signed on 28 January 1998 and symbolic for the increasing diversification and internationalization of spaceflight since its beginning

Participation of private actors and other countries beside the Soviet Union and the United States in spaceflight had been the case from the very start of spaceflight development. A first commercial satellite had been launched by 1962, as well as in 1965 a third country achieving orbital spaceflight. The very beginning of the space age, the launch of Sputnik was in the context of international exchange, the International Geophysical Year 1957. Also soon into the space age the international community came together starting to negotiate dedicated international law governing outer space activity.

In the 1970s the Soviet Union started to invite other countries to fly their people into space through its Intercosmos program and the United States started to include women and people of colour in its astronaut program.

First exchange between the United States and the Soviet Union was formalized in the 1962 Dryden–Blagonravov agreement, calling for cooperation on the exchange of data from weather satellites, a study of the Earth's magnetic field, and joint tracking of the NASA Echo II balloon satellite. In 1963 President Kennedy could even interest premier Khrushchev in a joint crewed Moon landing, but after the assassination of Kennedy in November 1963 and Khrushchev's removal from office in October 1964, the competition between the two nations' crewed space programs heated up, and talk of cooperation became less common, due to tense relations and military implications. Only later the United States and the Soviet Union slowly started to exchange more information and engage in joint programs, particularly in the light of the development of safety standards since 1970, producing the co-developed APAS-75 and later docking standards. Most notably this signaled the ending of the first era of the space age, the Space Race, through the Apollo–Soyuz which became the basis for the Shuttle–Mir program and eventually the International Space Station programme.

Such international cooperation, and international spaceflight organization was furthermore fueled by increasingly more countries achieving spaceflight capabilies and together with a by the 1980s established private spaceflight sector, both being embodied by the European Space Agency. This allowed the formation of an international and commercial post–Space-Race spaceflight economy and period, with by the 1990s a public perception of space exploration and space-related technologies as being increasingly commonplace.

This increasingly cooperative diversification persisted until competition started to rise in these diversified conditions, from the 2010s and particularly by the early 2020s.

=== 2010s to present: New Space competition ===
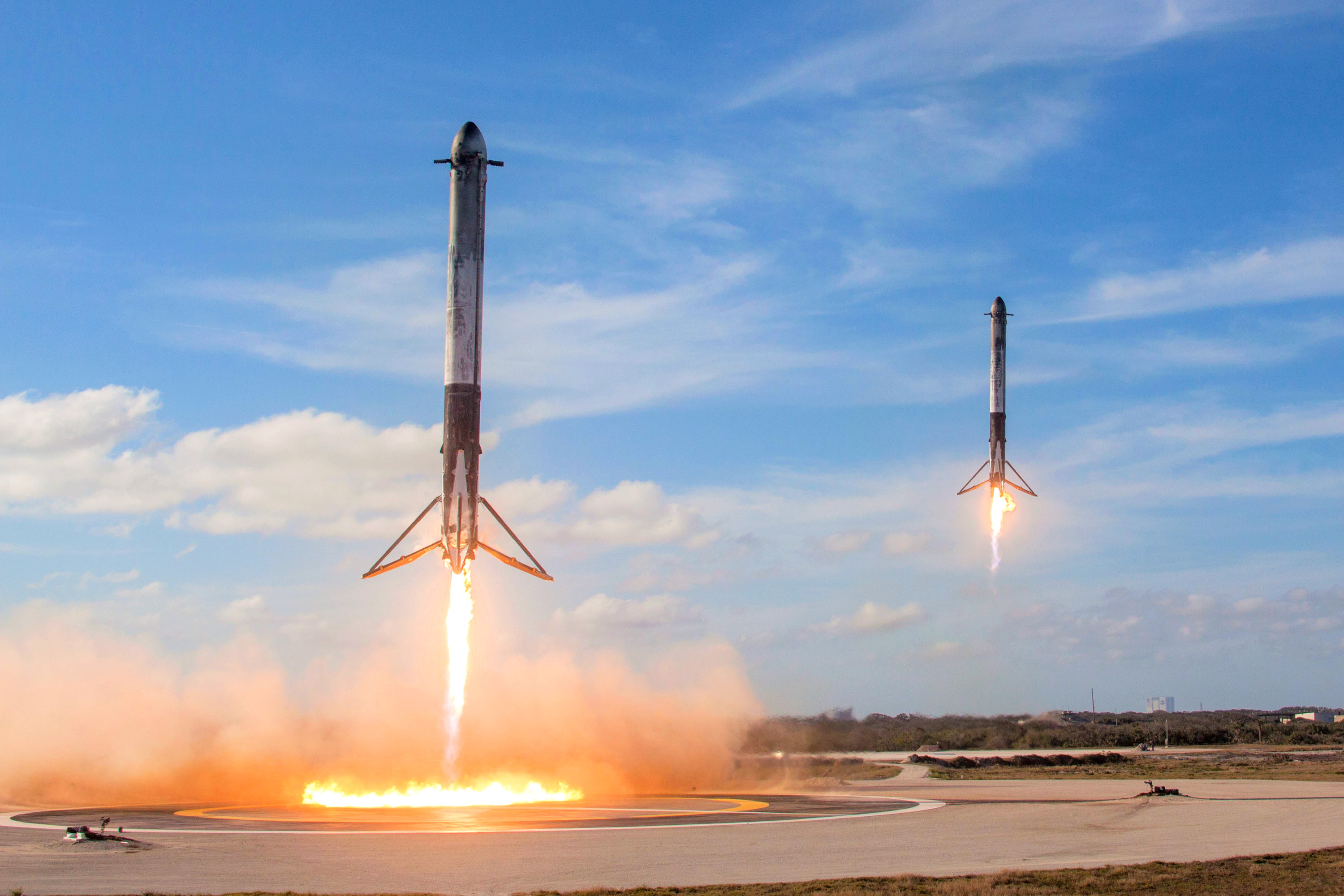
SpaceX's Falcon Heavy reusable side boosters land in unison at Cape Canaveral Landing Zones 1 and 2 following test flight on 6 February 2018.

In the early 21st century, the Ansari X Prize competition was set up to help jump-start private spaceflight. The winner, Space Ship One in 2004, became the first spaceship not funded by a government agency.

Several countries now have space programs; from related technology ventures to full-fledged space programs with launch facilities. There are many scientific and commercial satellites in use today, with thousands of satellites in orbit, and several countries have plans to send humans into space. Some of the countries joining this new race are France, India, China, Israel and the United Kingdom, all of which have employed surveillance satellites. There are several other countries with less extensive space programs, including Brazil, Germany, Ukraine, and Spain.

As for the United States space program, NASA permanently grounded all U.S. Space Shuttles in 2011. NASA has since relied on Russia and SpaceX to take American astronauts to and from the International Space Station. In the 2010s and early 2020s, NASA developed a deep-space crew capsule named the Orion to send humans to the Moon and Mars. NASA is hoping that this mission will "usher in a new era of space exploration." The U.S. military also joined the new space age with the creation of the new Space Force on 20 December 2019.

Another major factor affecting the current Space Age is the privatization of space flight. A significant private spaceflight company is SpaceX which became the proprietor of one of world's most capable operational launch vehicle when they launched their current largest rocket, the Falcon Heavy in 2018. Elon Musk, the founder and CEO of SpaceX, has put forward the goal of establishing a colony of one million people on Mars by 2050 and the company is developing its Starship launch vehicle to facilitate this. Since the Demo-2 mission for NASA in 2020 in which SpaceX launched astronauts for the first time to the International Space Station, the company has maintained an orbital human spaceflight capability. Blue Origin, a private company founded by Amazon.com founder Jeff Bezos, is developing rockets for use in space tourism, commercial satellite launches, and eventual missions to the Moon and beyond. Richard Branson's company Virgin Galactic is concentrating on launch vehicles for space tourism. A spinoff company, Virgin Orbit, air-launches small satellites with their LauncherOne rocket. Another small-satellite launcher, Rocket Lab, has developed the Electron rocket and the Photon satellite bus for sending spacecraft further into the Solar System, the company also plans to introduce the larger Neutron launch vehicle in 2025.

Elon Musk has stated that the main reason he founded SpaceX is to make humanity a multiplanetary species, and cites reasons for doing it including: To ensure the long-term continuation of our species and protecting the "light of consciousness". He also said,

You want to wake up in the morning and think the future is going to be great – and that's what being a spacefaring civilization is all about. It's about believing in the future and thinking that the future will be better than the past. And I can't think of anything more exciting than going out there and being among the stars.

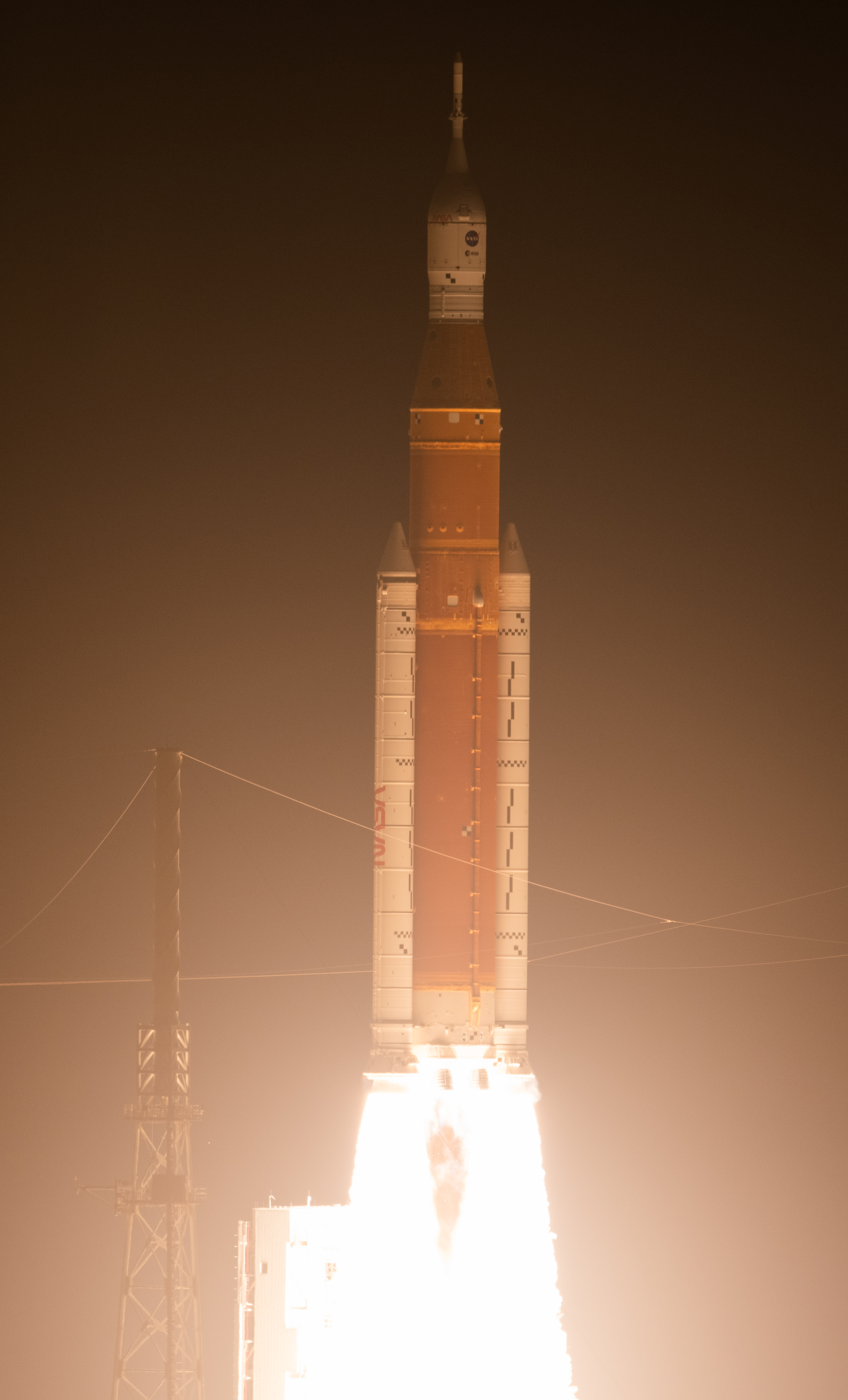
The Space Launch System lifts off on its maiden flight to space, then on to the Moon.

The Space Age marked a major comeback with the launch of NASA's Space Launch System and Orion during the Artemis I mission on November 16, 2022; this marked the first time a human-rated spacecraft had orbited the Moon in nearly 50 years, as well as the return of the United States' capability to send astronauts to the Moon. Artemis II, a crewed lunar flyby, launched on April 1, 2026, sending the first humans to the Moon's vicinity since the Apollo era; the crew set a new record for the farthest distance any human has traveled in space, surpassing the mark set by Apollo 13 in 1970. Additional goals for the 2020s include the completion of the Lunar Gateway, mankind's first space station around the Moon, the first crewed Moon landing since the Apollo era with Artemis IV, and goals to expand beyond the original vision of the Space Age's original era in the 1960s.

== Chronology ==
Date	First	Project	Participant	Country
June 20, 1944	Artificial object in outer space, i.e. beyond the Kármán line	V-2 rocket MW 18014 test flight	—N/a	Germany
October 24, 1946	Pictures from space (105 km)	U.S.-launched V-2 rocket from White Sands Missile Range, New Mexico.	—N/a	United States
February 20, 1947	Animals in space	U.S.-launched V-2 rocket on 20 February 1947 from White Sands Missile Range, New Mexico.	fruit flies	United States
October 4, 1957	Artificial satellite	Sputnik 1	—N/a	Soviet Union
November 3, 1957	Animal in orbit	Sputnik 2	Laika the dog	Soviet Union
January 2, 1959	Lunar flyby, spacecraft to achieve a heliocentric orbit	Luna 1	—N/a	Soviet Union
September 12, 1959	Impact on the Lunar surface; thereby becoming the first human object to reach another celestial body	Luna 2	—N/a	Soviet Union
October 7, 1959	Pictures of the far side of the Moon, first spacecraft to use Gravity assist	Luna 3	—N/a	Soviet Union
January 31, 1961	Hominidae in space	Mercury-Redstone 2	Ham (chimpanzee)	United States
April 12, 1961	Human in space	Vostok 1	Yuri Gagarin	Soviet Union
May 5, 1961	Manual orientation of crewed spacecraft	Freedom 7 (Mercury-Redstone 3)	Alan Shepard	United States
December 14, 1962	Successful flyby of another planet (Venus closest approach 34,773 kilometers)	Mariner 2	—N/a	United States
March 18, 1965	Spacewalk	Voskhod 2	Alexei Leonov	Soviet Union
December 15, 1965	Space rendezvous	Gemini 6A and Gemini 7	Schirra, Stafford, Borman, Lovell	United States
February 3, 1966	Soft landing on the Moon by a spacecraft	Luna 9	—N/a	Soviet Union
March 1, 1966	Human-made object to impact another planet	Venera 3	—N/a	Soviet Union
March 16, 1966	Orbital docking between two spacecraft	Gemini 8 & Agena Target Vehicle	Neil Armstrong, David Scott	United States
April 3, 1966	Artificial satellite of another celestial body (other than the Sun)	Luna 10	—N/a	Soviet Union
October 18, 1967	Telemetry from the atmosphere of another planet	Venera 4	—N/a	Soviet Union
December 21–27, 1968	Humans to orbit the Moon	Apollo 8	Borman, Lovell, Anders	United States
July 20, 1969	Humans land and walk on the Moon	Apollo 11	Neil Armstrong, Buzz Aldrin	United States
December 15, 1970	Telemetry from the surface of another planet	Venera 7	—N/a	Soviet Union
April 19, 1971	Operational space station	Salyut 1	—N/a	Soviet Union
June 7, 1971	Resident crew	Soyuz 11 (Salyut 1)	Georgy Dobrovolsky, Vladislav Volkov, Viktor Patsayev	Soviet Union
July 20, 1976	Pictures from the surface of Mars	Viking 1	—N/a	United States
April 12, 1981	Reusable orbital spaceship	STS-1	Young, Crippen	United States
February 19, 1986	Long-duration space station	Mir	—N/a	Soviet Union
February 14, 1990	Photograph of the whole Solar System	Voyager 1	—N/a	United States
November 20, 1998	Current space station	International Space Station	—N/a	Russia
August 25, 2012	Interstellar space probe	Voyager 1	—N/a	United States
November 12, 2014	Probe to soft-land on a comet (67P/Churyumov–Gerasimenko)	Rosetta	—N/a	European Space Agency
July 14, 2015	Space probes to explore all major planets recognized in 1981	New Horizons	—N/a	United States
December 20, 2015	Vertical landing of an orbital rocket booster on a ground pad.	Falcon 9 flight 20	—N/a	United States
April 8, 2016	Vertical landing of an orbital rocket booster on a floating platform at sea.	SpaceX CRS-8	—N/a	United States
March 30, 2017	Relaunch and second landing of a used orbital rocket booster.	SES-10	—N/a	United States
January 3, 2019	Soft landing on the lunar far side	Chang'e 4	—N/a	China
May 30, 2020	Human orbital spaceflight launched by a private company	Crew Dragon Demo-2/Crew Demo-2/SpaceX Demo-2/Dragon Crew Demo-2	Bob Behnken, Doug Hurley	United States
April 19, 2021	First powered controlled extraterrestrial flight by an aircraft	Ingenuity as part of NASA's Mars 2020 mission	—N/a	United States
July 11, 2021	Commercial space tourism flight	Virgin Galactic Unity 22	David Mackay, Michael Masucci, Sirisha Bandla, Colin Bennet, Beth Moses, Richard Branson	United States
October 5, 2021	Feature-length fiction film shot in space (The Challenge)	Soyuz MS-19	Anton Shkaplerov, Klim Shipenko, Yulia Peresild	Russia
November 16, 2022	Artemis I launch restoring American capability to get humans to the Moon	Artemis I	—N/a	United States
June 6, 2024	First successful instance of both stages of a launch vehicle returned for a controlled landing	Starship flight test 4		United States
October 13, 2024	First catch of a rocket booster	Starship flight test 5		United States
April 1, 2026	First crewed lunar flyby since the Apollo era; farthest humans have ever traveled from Earth	Artemis II	Reid Wiseman, Victor Glover, Christina Koch, Jeremy Hansen	United States / Canada

== Cultural influences ==
=== Arts and architecture ===
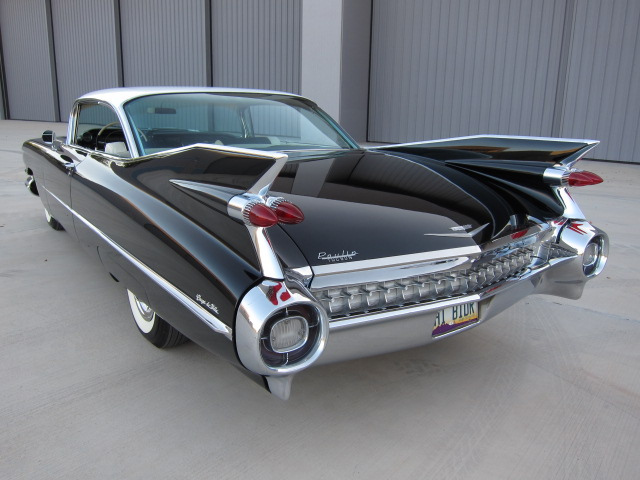
Iconic rocket ship-shaped tail lights and fins on a 1959 Cadillac Coupe de Ville

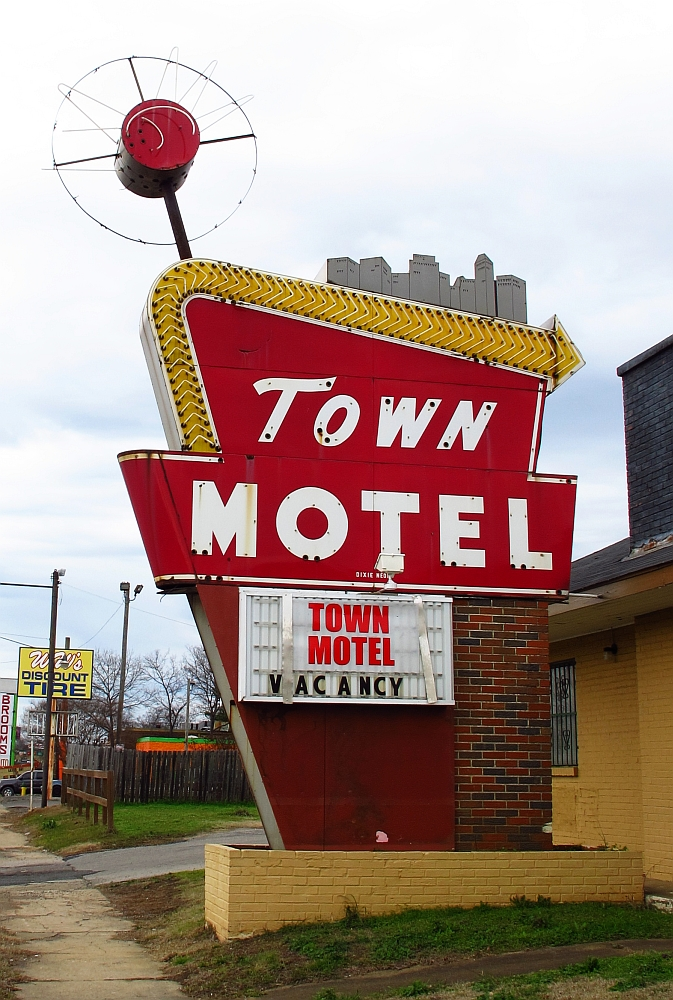
Satellite-influenced signage at the Town Motel in Birmingham, Alabama

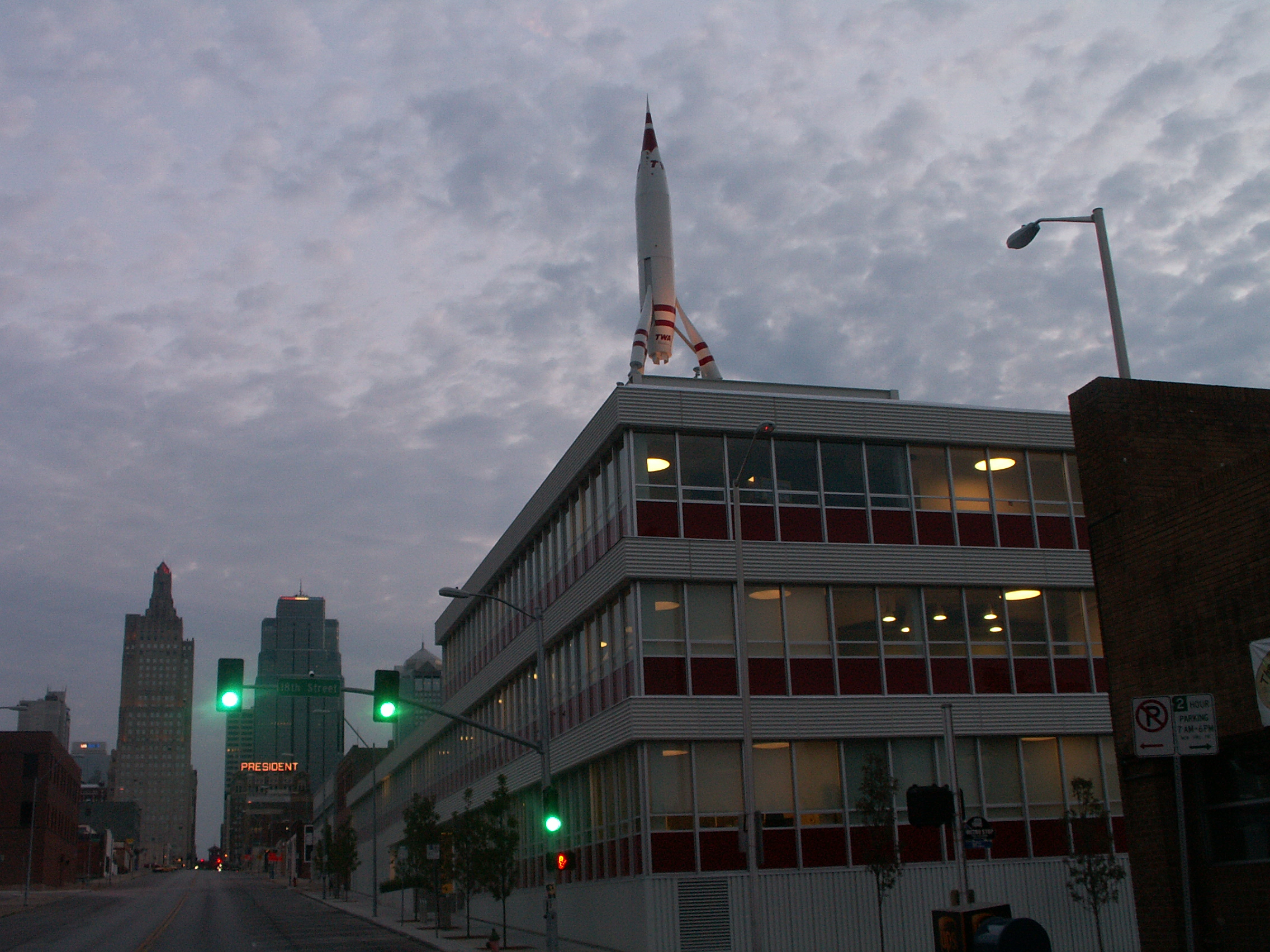
TWA Moonliner II replica atop the restored TWA Corporate Headquarters building in Kansas City, MO, 2007

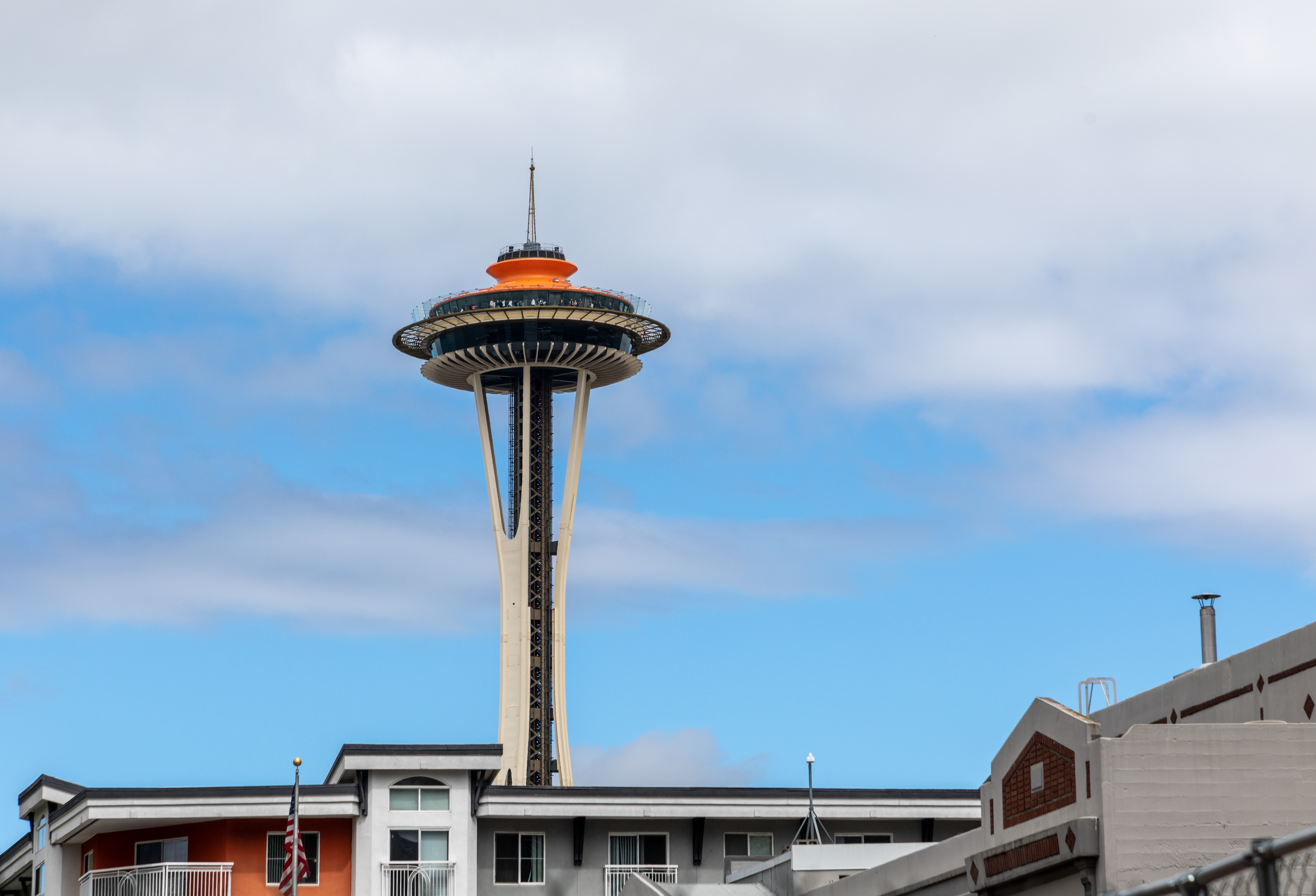
The Space Needle, in Seattle WA, resembles a flying saucer and draws inspiration from the Space Age.

The Space Age is considered to have influenced:

- Automotive design: Virgil Exner's Forward Look, 1957–1961
- Googie architecture
- Space Age fashions by André Courrèges, Pierre Cardin, Paco Rabanne, Rudi Gernreich, Emanuel Ungaro, Jean-Marie Armand, Michèle Rosier, and Diana Dew
- Furniture design of the 1950s and '60s by Eero Saarinen, Arne Jacobsen, Eero Aarnio, and Verner Panton
- Amusement park attractions, such as TWA Moonliner and Mission: Space
- Cold War playground equipment

=== Music ===
The Space Age also inspired musical genres:

- Space age pop
- Space music
- Space rock
- Space-themed music

== See also ==
- SEDS
- Information Age
- Jet Age
- Atomic Age
