= Airline History Museum =

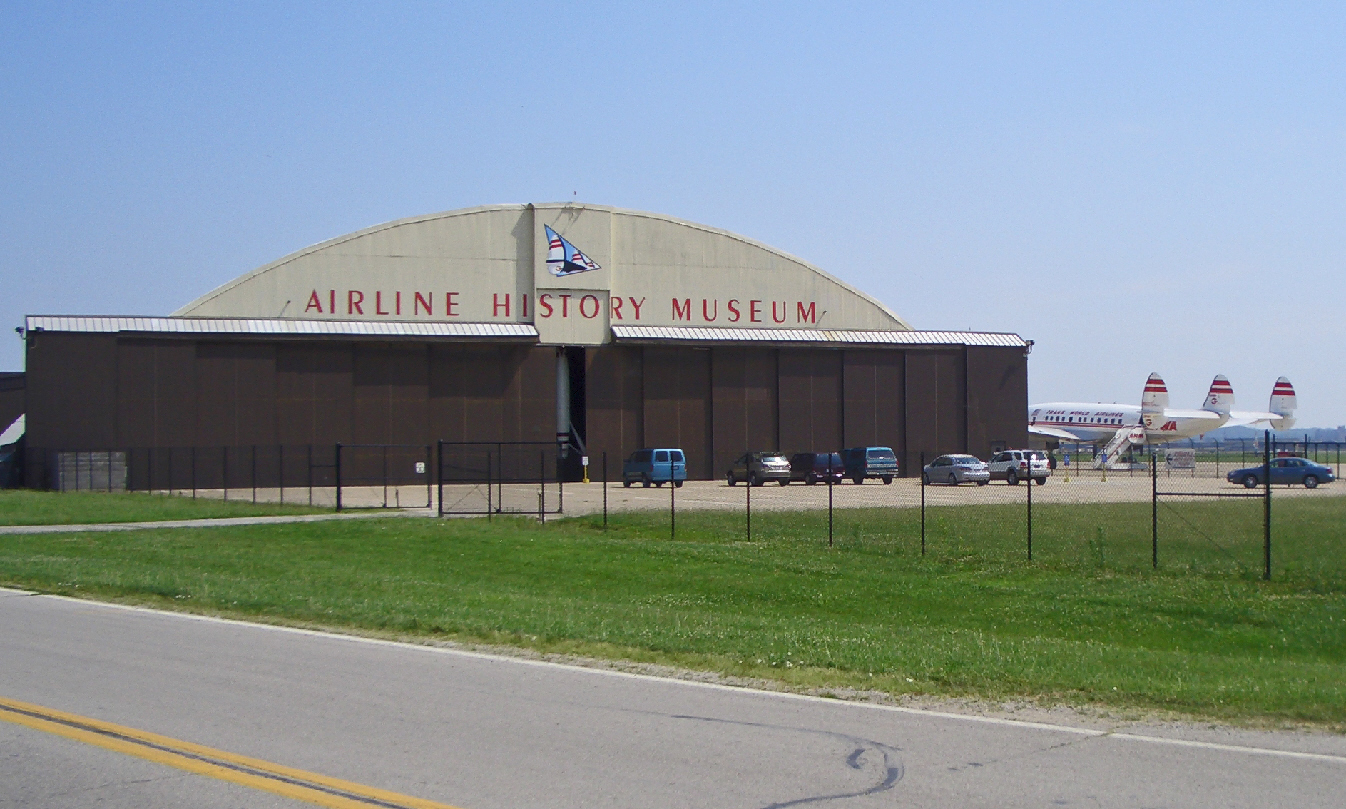
- The museum hangar with the Lockheed Constellation on the ramp

- Location within Missouri Location within the United States
- Former name: National Airline History Museum
- Established: 1986
- Location: Charles B. Wheeler Downtown Airport, Kansas City, Missouri
- Coordinates: 39.118693°N 94.600160°W
- Type: Aviation museum
- Founders: Larry A. Brown; Dick McMahon
- President: John Roper
- Website: airlinehistory.org

The Airline History Museum is an aviation museum located at the Kansas City Downtown Airport in Kansas City, Missouri focused on the history of airlines in the United States.

== History ==
Founded in 1986 by aviation enthusiasts Larry A. Brown and Dick McMahon, the Airline History Museum was originally known as Save-A-Connie. Brown and McMahon were joined by a number of other enthusiasts, including (then) current and former TWA employees.

The museum initially considered building a hangar to house the Constellation, but eventually reached an agreement to lease Hangar 9 at Kansas City Downtown Airport from Executive Beechcraft in 2000.

The museum's director was convicted of embezzlement in 2010.

In January 2011, as part of its 25th anniversary, the museum announced a goal of meeting the "Characteristics of Excellence" standards established by the American Alliance of Museums. To that end, it began a reorganization plan, which included a complete rebranding effort to include a new membership structure, website, corporate logo, and exhibit structure within the museum building.

In March 2011 the museum announced that in the continuation of its reorganization and restructure, it was being renamed the National Airline History Museum. This name change allowed it to be better positioned to receive Federal grants and other national funding. The museum announced in March, 2011 that it had teamed up with Kansas City's Roasterie Coffee Shop, with the Roasterie brand being known as "The Official Coffee of the National Airline History Museum" and carrying an image of the museum's DC-3 on its coffee products.

In 2013, the museum announced plans to restore its Lockheed Constellation to flight.

In 2014, the museum acquired a Douglas DC-8 and attempted to have it ferried to the museum. However, the plan to store it on the ramp outside the hangar was rejected by the owner of the property.

In 2016, the museum acquired a Boeing 727 in storage at Boeing Field in Seattle, Washington. However, it was scrapped in 2021 after the museum was unable to move it.

The same year, the museum announced plans to partner with the owner of a Northrop Delta to have it restored. By that time its name had reverted to the Airline History Museum.

In 2020, the museum acquired a Ryan PT-22 Recruit that belonged to actor Harrison Ford.

The museum was threatened with eviction in 2019, when the airport required the owner of the hangar, Signature Flight Support, to start paying rent. The museum was served an eviction notice in 2022. The following year the museum was locked out of their hangar. In 2024, it filed a complaint with the Federal Aviation Administration over the issue. The museum sold its Constellation to John Travolta later that year. An Eaglet that was on loan to the museum from Kansas City was planned to be returned to its owner in May 2025. The Moonliner rocket will be moved to the TWA Museum on the opposite side of the airport in September 2025. The complaints by the museum were dismissed in April 2026, but criticized the city for being uninvolved in the management of the airport and how the museum was treated.

== Exhibits ==
The museum maintains five aircraft at the site; two are in flying condition and one is undergoing restoration. An additional corporate mock-up is also on display.

=== Martin 4-0-4 ===
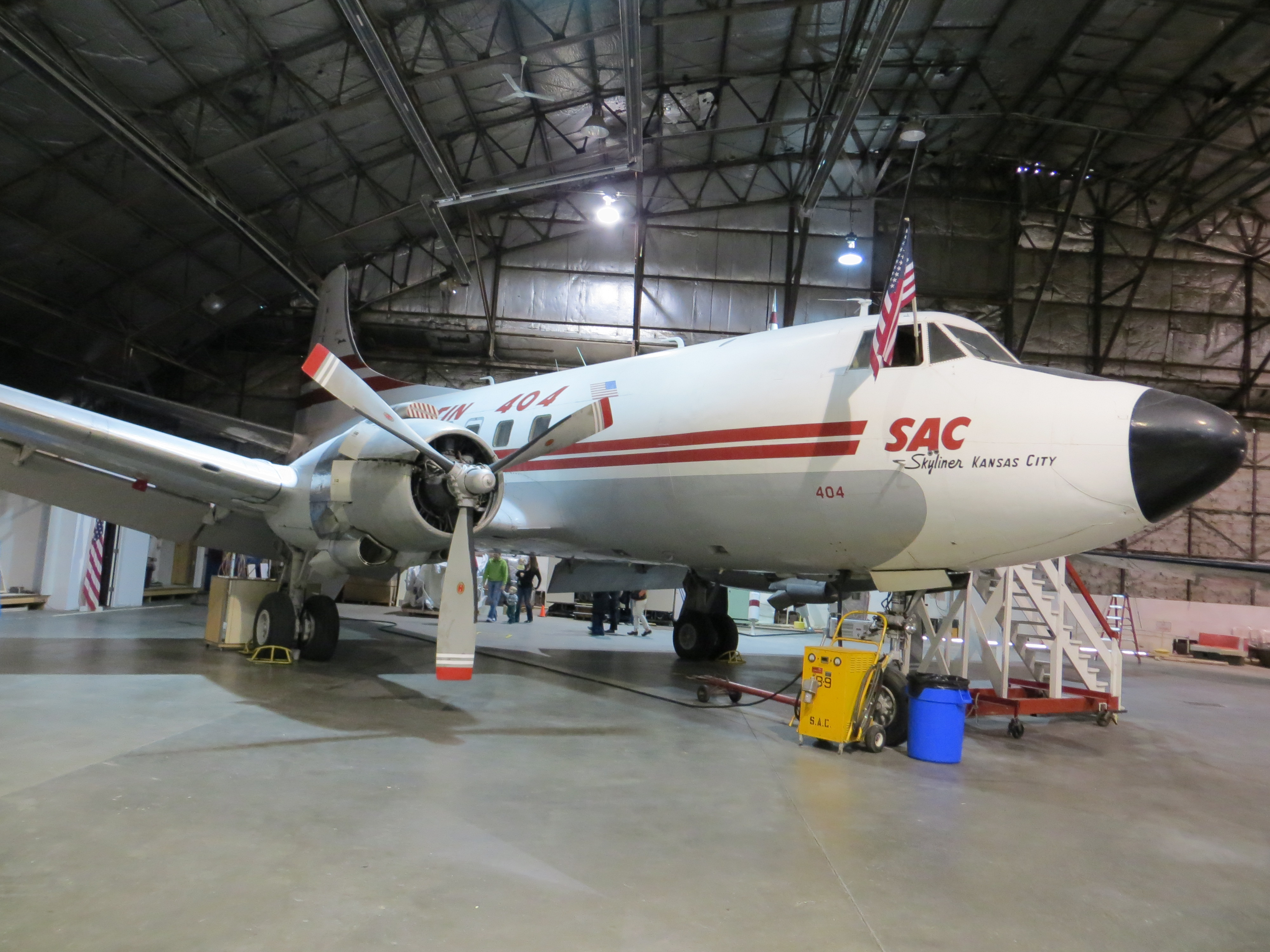
Martin 4-0-4

There were only 103 Martin 4-0-4s built. TWA operated 40 in their fleet along the U. S. east coast, while strong competitor Eastern Airlines operated the largest 4-0-4 fleet, flying 60 aircraft along that airline's eastern seaboard route, including in and around Florida. The museum's Martin 4-0-4 has not flown in years. As part of the National Airline History Museum’s reorganization plan, which began in 2011, a maintenance inspection of the Martin 4-0-4 was completed in August 2011 to determine the feasibility of returning the aircraft to flying status. Rumors of extensive corrosion and insurmountable mechanical problems were found to be untrue, and a maintenance program is being developed to return the aircraft to flying condition.

=== Douglas DC-3 ===
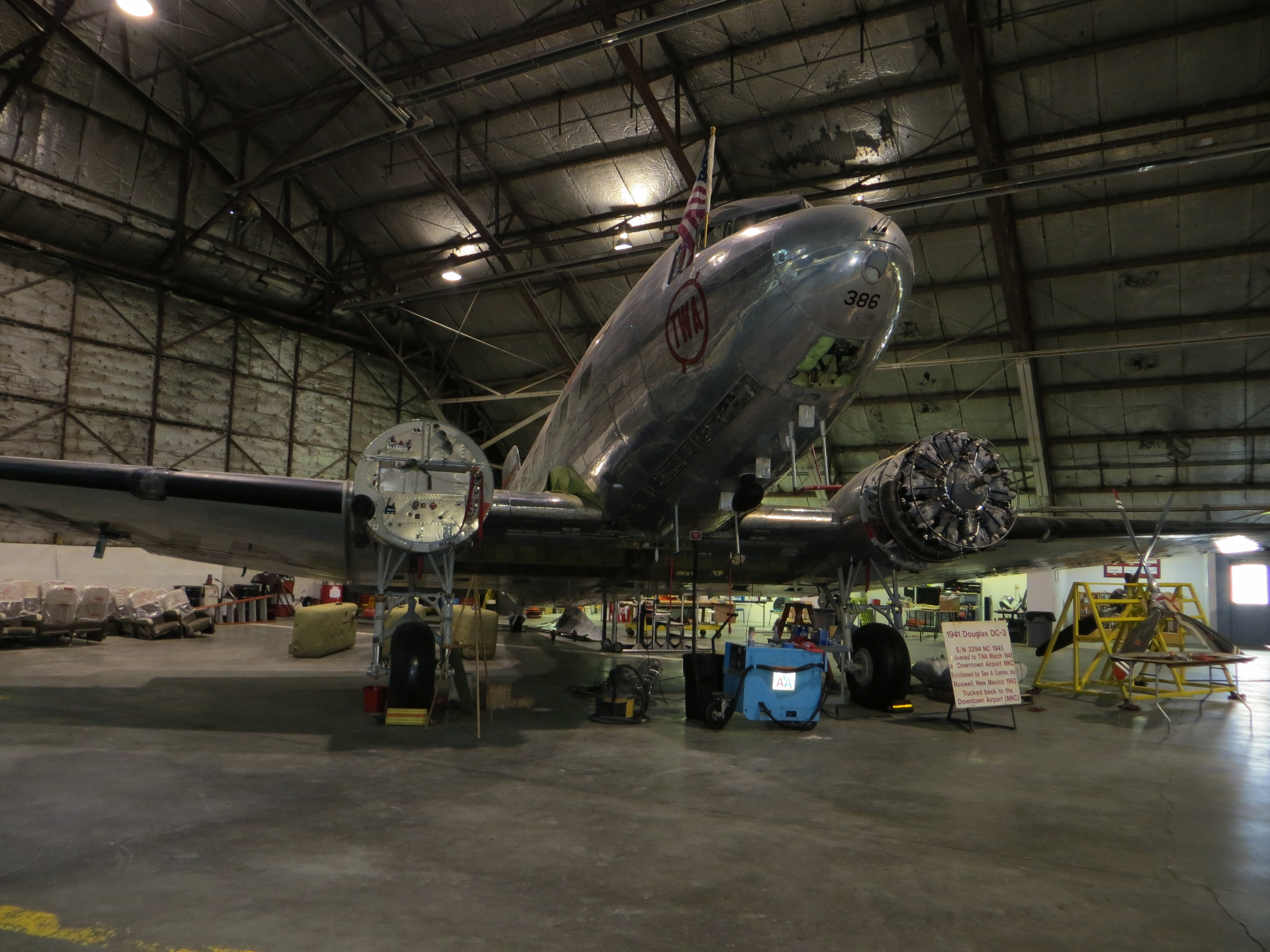
Douglas DC-3-G202A NC1945

The museum's DC-3 is currently being made airworthy. One of its two engines has been overhauled, while its second is still undergoing a rebuild; the exterior and interior restoration of the aircraft is nearing completion, while the installation of new carpeting and restored seats has been completed. This Douglas DC-3-G202A, registration number NC1945, serial number 3294, was built in Santa Monica, California in February 1941. It was delivered to Transcontinental and Western Airlines at Kansas City, Missouri, on March 4, 1941, and now resides in its original home city again.

=== Lockheed Super "G" Constellation ===
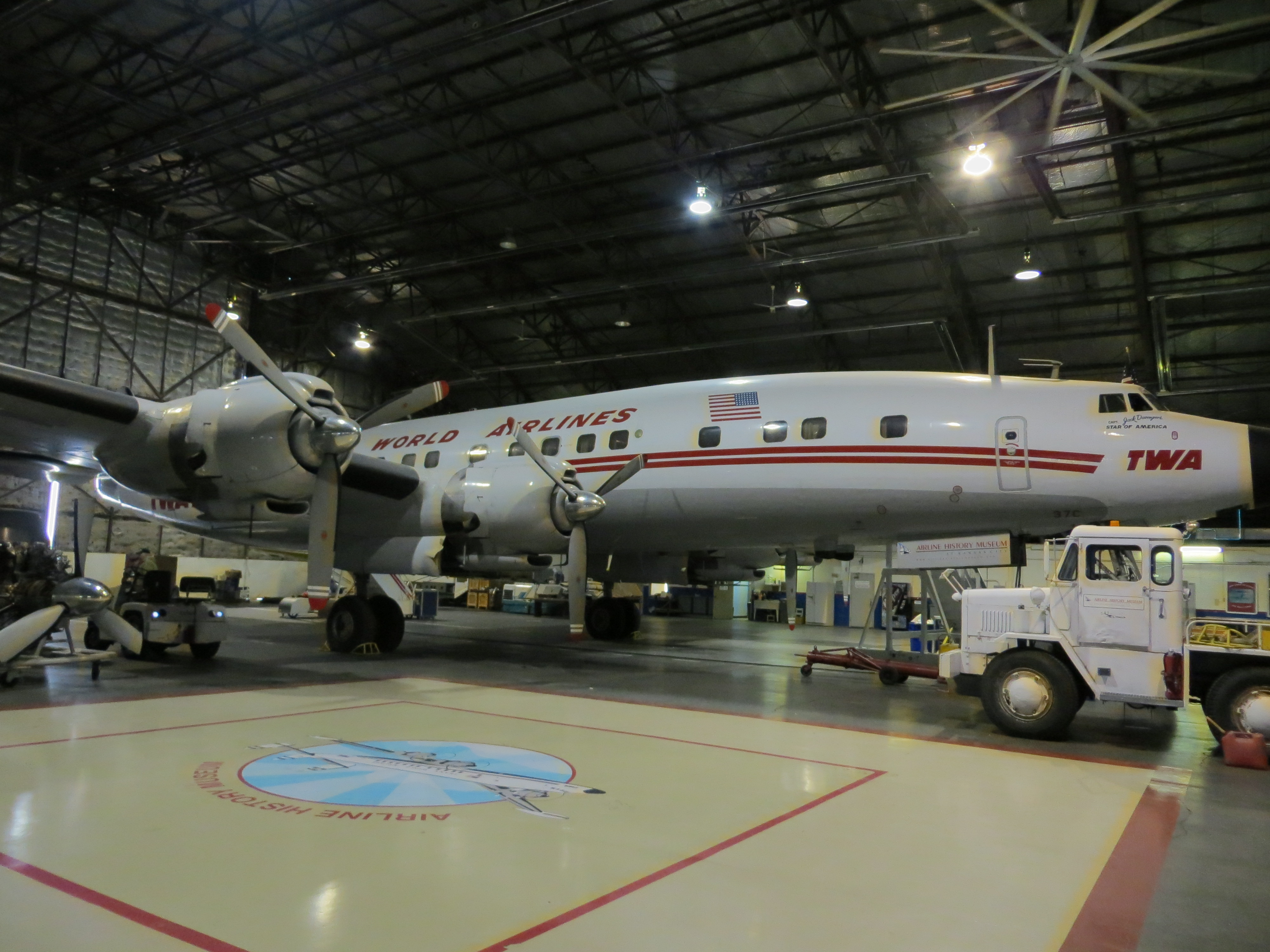
Lockheed Super G Constellation

The Lockheed Super "G" Constellation ("Super-Connie"), which holds the distinction of being the first Constellation ever to be fully restored to flying condition, has not been flown to air shows in recent years. Originally donated to Save-A-Connie by Paul Pristo in 1986, maintenance is still ongoing, with the goal being to get the Connie back in the air. The aircraft has completed several successful four engine test runs and is well on the way to becoming airworthy once again. Nicknamed "Star of America", this Constellation appeared in television and movie releases, as well as in several television commercials. It was featured in the Arts and Entertainment cable channel documentary First Flights, narrated by Astronaut Neil Armstrong, and the motion picture, Voyager released in the U. S. in 1992. The Connie's interior was also used in scenes for the 1995 movie Ace Ventura When Nature Calls, starring actor Jim Carrey. It also appeared in the 2004 movie The Aviator, directed by Martin Scorsese, which depicts the early years (late 1920s to the mid-1940s) of legendary film director and aviator Howard Hughes; the film starred Leonardo DiCaprio, Kate Beckinsale, and Cate Blanchett.

=== TWA's corporate "Moonliner II" replica ===
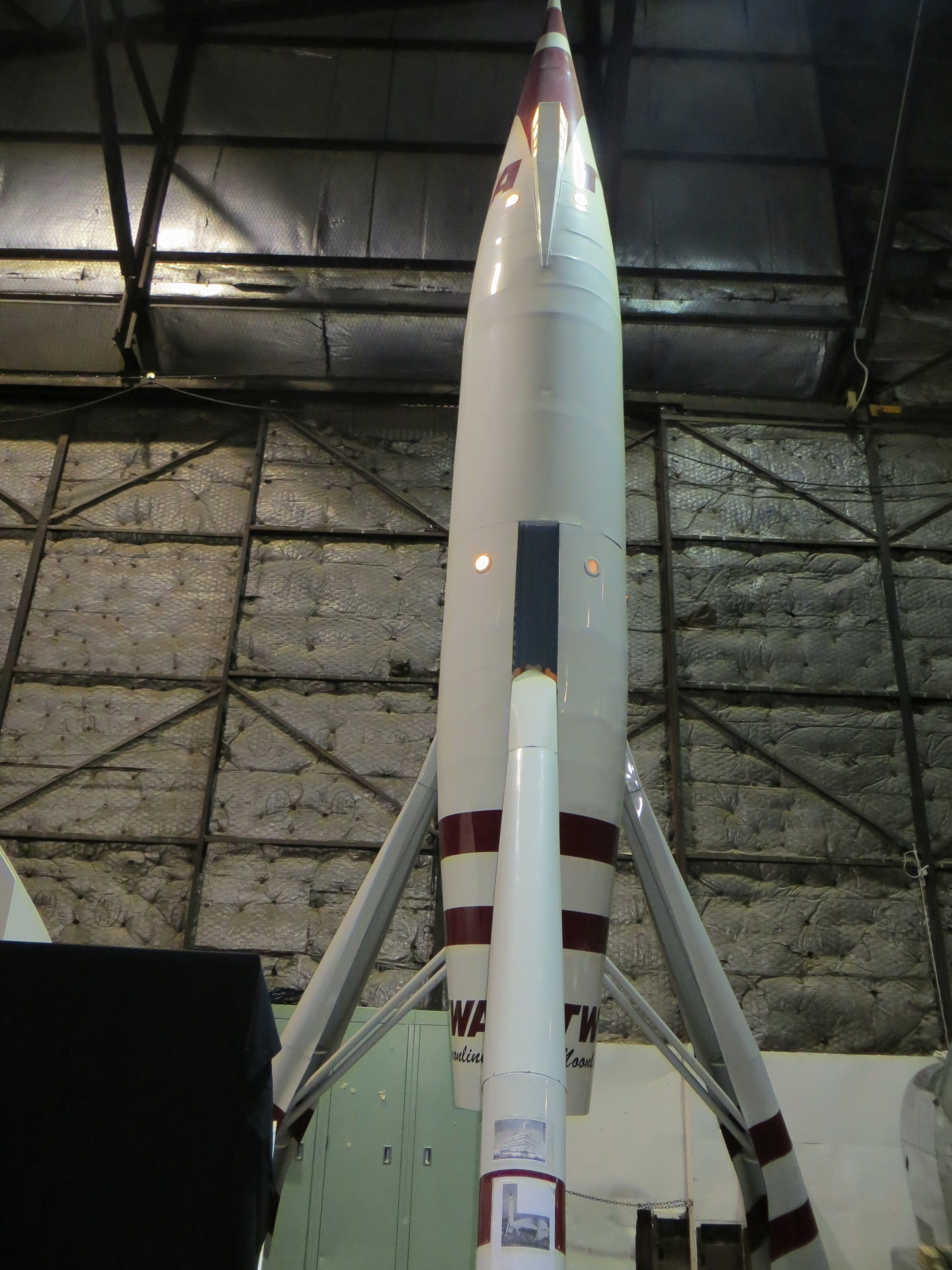
TWA's corporate "Moonliner II" replica

In 1956, after TWA became the corporate sponsor of Disneyland's TWA Moonliner attraction in Anaheim, CA, Howard Hughes added a 22-foot-tall (6.7 m) reproduction of Disney's one-third scale Moonliner, known as the TWA Moonliner II, atop the southwest corner of Kansas City's TWA Corporate Headquarters' Building, located at 18th Street and Baltimore, near downtown Kansas City. Disneyland's TWA Moonliner was a promotional concept of what a TWA atomic-powered spaceliner would look like in the faraway year of 1986. When Hughes and Disney ended their business partnership in 1962 after Hughes sold TWA, the airline's new management removed the Moonliner II reproduction from its roof and sold it to a local travel-trailer company called SpaceCraft.

When SpaceCraft moved to Concordia, Missouri, in 1970, the now all-white Moonliner II landed on the south side of Interstate 70 (between Kansas City and St. Louis) where SpaceCraft operated a campground near its trailer manufacturing plant. It slowly rusted on that spot for more than 25 years. In 1997 a Columbia lawyer who collected Disney memorabilia bought the deteriorating Moonliner II. He then began a long, careful restoration process, eventually bringing it back to its 1956 condition and sporting its original red and white TWA paint scheme. It is currently on loan to the museum for display to both airliner and TWA enthusiasts. The Moonliner II is located about five miles from its original TWA rooftop location.

=== Lockheed L-1011 Tristar ===
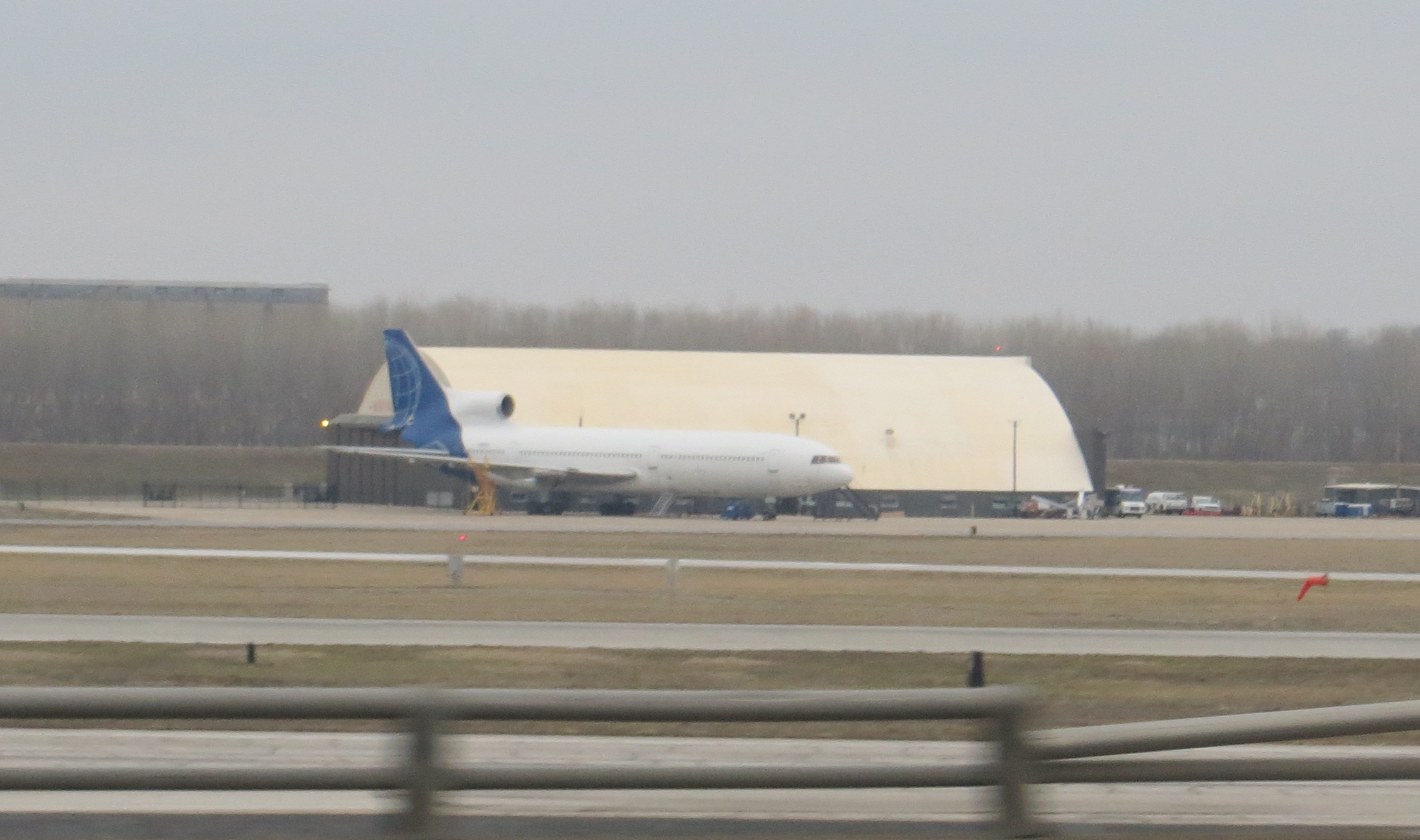
Lockheed L-1011 TriStar N700TS

The museum announced in April 2009 that it was acquiring one of the last six remaining operational Lockheed L-1011 Tristar aircraft in the U.S., its donation to the museum made possible by Paul Pristo.

FAA approval was granted to ferry the aircraft from Roswell, New Mexico, (ROW) to Kansas City, Missouri, (MKC). The aircraft arrived safely on January 30, 2010, shortly after 3:00 pm. This aircraft first flew in 1972 under the red-and-white colors of hometown airline TWA. Due to its large size, it was parked south of the museum's hangar at Wheeler Airport, the large tail hanging beyond the fence line surrounding the downtown airport's apron. The airframe was scrapped in May 2026.

=== Simulators ===
==== Lockheed L-1011 Tristar Simulator ====
A full-motion, working Lockheed L-1011 Tristar simulator was donated to the museum by Orbital Sciences Corporation; it was never installed and later removed from the museum's possession and transferred to a site in California.

==== Lockheed L-1011 Tristar Cockpit Procedures Trainer ====
The museum also has a cockpit procedures trainer for the Lockheed L-1011 Tristar, originally belonging to Trans World Airlines.

==== General Purpose ====
A general purpose, custom-built flight simulator occupies part of the main foyer of the museum.

== See also ==
- National Museum of Commercial Aviation
