= Kansas City Airport =

Kansas City Airport may refer to airports in the Kansas City metro area.

- Kansas City International Airport (IATA: MCI)
- Charles B. Wheeler Downtown Airport (IATA: MKC)
