= TWA Administrative Offices Building =

- U.S. National Register of Historic Places
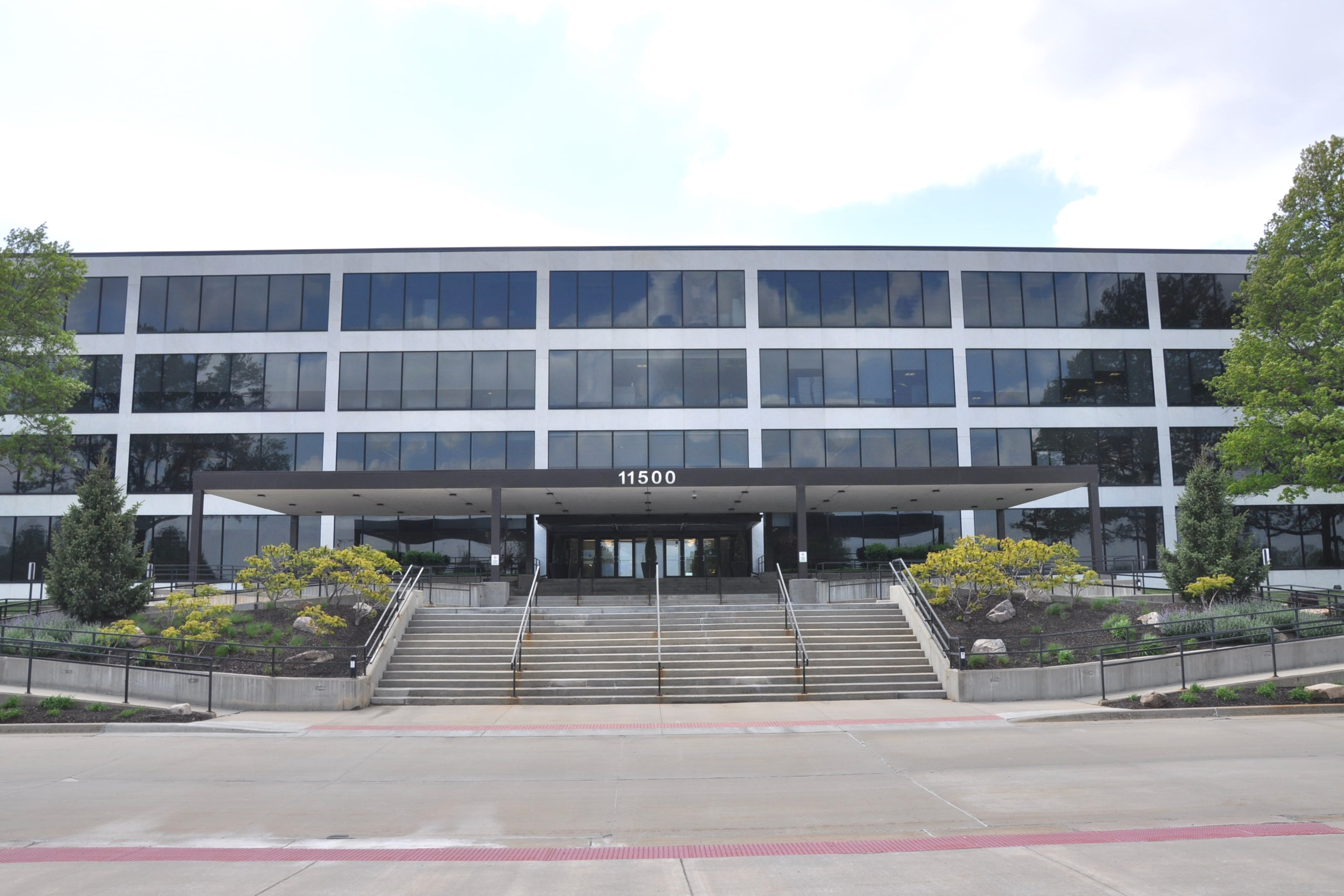

- Location within Missouri Location within the United States
- Location: 11500 Ambassador Dr., Kansas City, Missouri
- Coordinates: 39°18′07″N 94°40′54″W
- Area: 30 acres (12 ha)
- Built: 1968-1971
- Architect: Skidmore Owings & Merrill; Wilson, Morris, Crain & Anderson
- Architectural style: Modern Movement, Miesian
- NRHP reference No.: 07001157
- Added to NRHP: November 6, 2007

TWA Administrative Offices Building is a historic office building located at Kansas City, Platte County, Missouri. It was designed by the architectural firm Skidmore, Owings & Merrill and Wilson, Morris, Crain & Anderson and built between 1968 and 1971 for Trans World Airlines. It is a four-story, rectangular, Modern Movement Miesian style building. It measures 252 feet by 396 feet and is a steel frame building with a curtain wall of tinted grey-black glass separated by thin black aluminum muntins and panels of white marble. The building encompasses approximately 500,000 square feet of space.

It was listed on the National Register of Historic Places in 2007.

== See also ==
- TWA Corporate Headquarters Building
