= Breech Academy =

Coordinates: 39.0134°N 94.6596°W

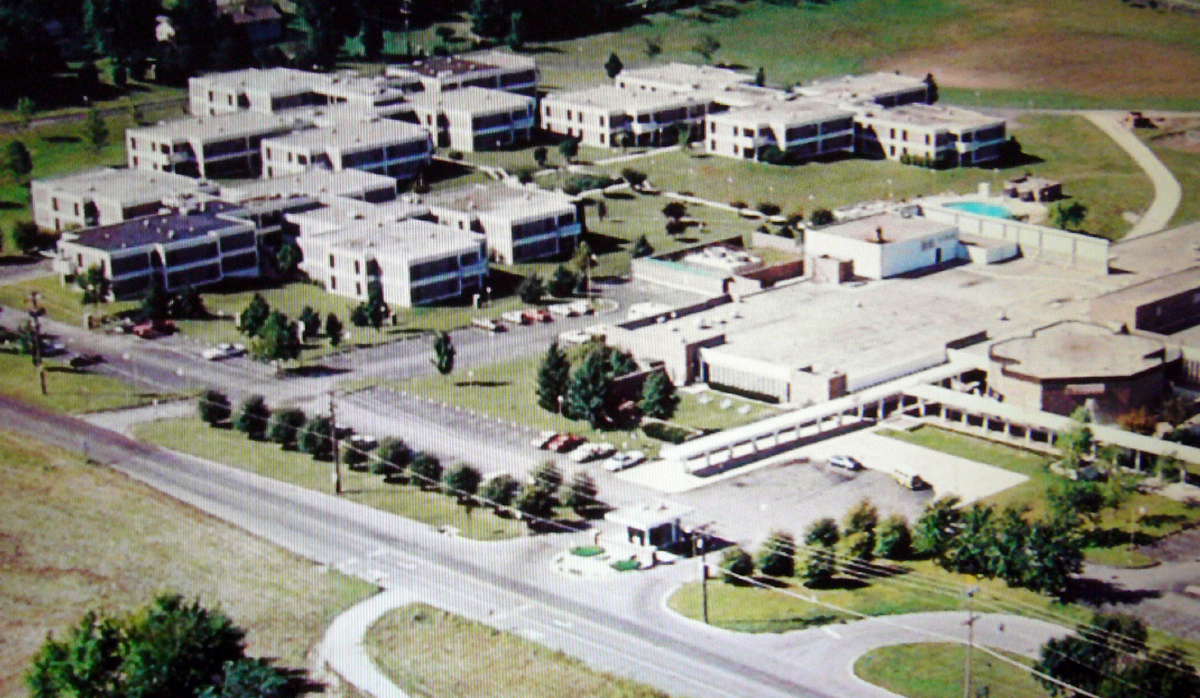

Information
- School type: Flight attendant school
- Established: December 3, 1969
- Closed: 1988
- Authority: Trans World Airlines

Breech Academy (also called Breech Training Academy) was a school operated by Trans World Airlines between 1969 and 1988 to train flight attendants, ticket agents, and even pilots. Management training classes were attended there by TWA employees as well as external managers and prospective managers. It was named for TWA executive Ernest R. Breech.

== History ==
TWA opened the academy on December 3, 1969, on a 34-acre (140,000 m^{2}), three-building campus at 6300 Lamar Ave. in Overland Park, Kansas, to train women to be stewardesses and air hostesses. The academy was so popular that other airlines sent their own flight attendants to the school. Previously, TWA had done its training at its TWA Corporate Headquarters Building in downtown Kansas City.

In 1972, TWA started interviewing young men for the position that had previously been held exclusively by women. The name "Hostess" thus became "Flight Attendant" because of the addition of male employees to that position. Two men were in the first class that started in April 1972. Neither of the first two male candidates would graduate. In the years to follow, hundreds of men would eventually graduate from the Breech Academy as Flight Attendants.

== Training facilities ==
It was a "state-of-the-art" training school for flight attendants, surpassing any and all other airline schools in the United States at that time. The training included being taught inside actual interiors of airplanes such as 747s, L-1011s, and others.

This included intense training of the flight attendants on food and beverage service and emergency procedures which included shimmying down a deflated ramp from 30 feet (9.1 m) to the ground from the plane's emergency door hatch. In addition, physical inspections included weekly weigh-ins. There were modern classrooms, air-conditioned and well-lit with oval-type seating for the "book"-type learning.

== Rooming facilities ==
The academy was renowned for its flight attendant dormitories which were in "pods" with decorative themes such as "Africa", "Asia" and other regional themes. In the African theme, there were leopard skins, bows, and other African type objects on the walls of the living room "pod".

Each "pod" had a sunken living room; or "Common Area" with 10 individual dorm-type rooms for two student flight attendants. These "pods" were grouped so that you could easily visit each dorm room while walking a full circle. In the evenings, many of the flight attendants in their "pod" would converge into the common area room to mingle.

The pods were known colloquially as the “living and loving” centers.

== Graduation ==
At graduation for the flight attendants, the parents and visitors were invited to watch the graduation ceremony taking place on the school stage as the flight attendants accepted their "wings".

== Breech Academy today ==
The Breech Academy’s old dorms are now office spaces owned by Asset Management Group. The buildings were purchased on November 11, 2021, and the office park is being rebranded as ‘Legacy Park’.
