= TWA Corporate Headquarters Building =

- U.S. National Register of Historic Places
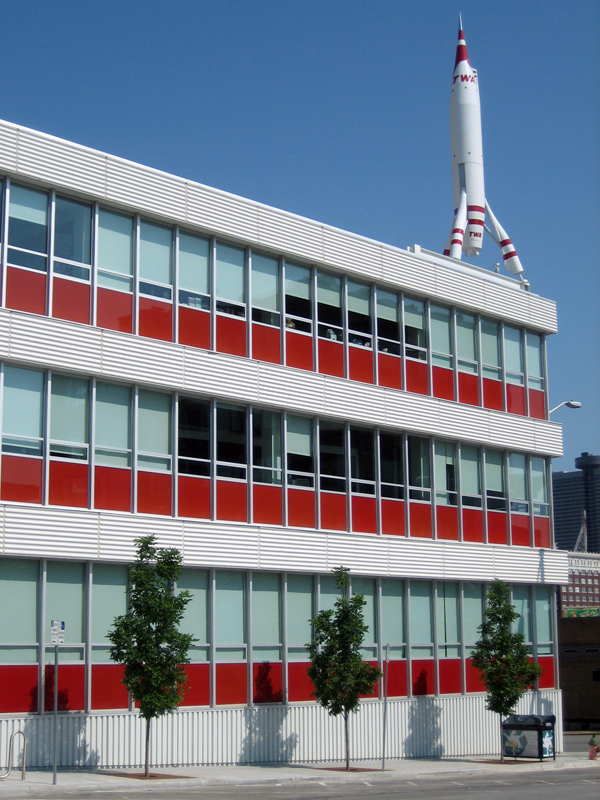

- Location within Missouri Location within the United States
- Location: Kansas City, Missouri
- Coordinates: 39°05′32.55″N 94°35′4.15″W
- Area: less than one acre
- Built: 1955-1956
- Architect: Raymond E. Bales, Jr. and Morris Schechter
- Architectural style: International style, Miesian
- NRHP reference No.: 02001403
- Added to NRHP: November 20, 2002

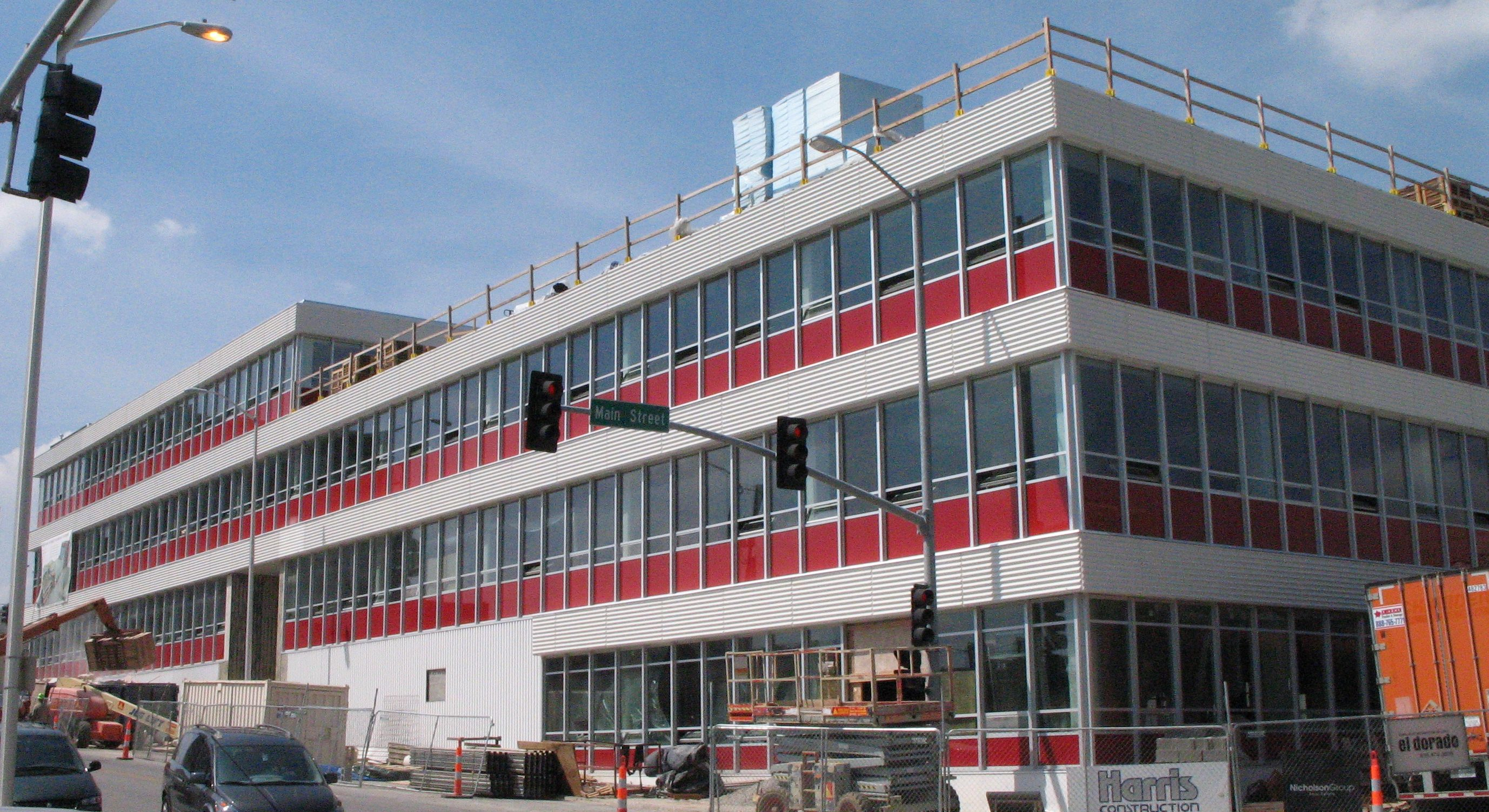
TWA headquarters in downtown Kansas City being renovated in August 2006.

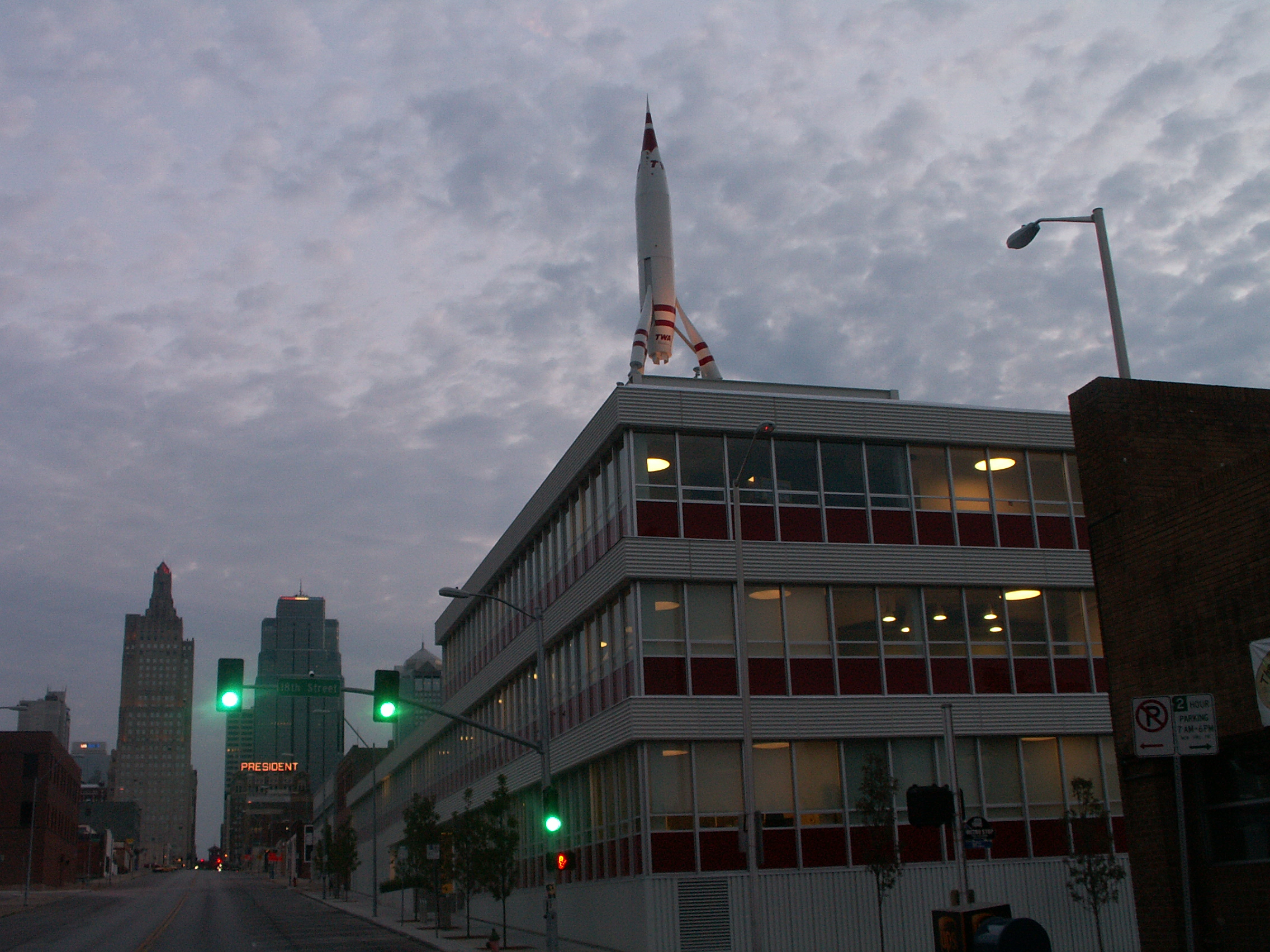
The refurbished headquarters building in 2007 with the Moonliner II replica installed.

The TWA Corporate Headquarters Building, located at 1735 Baltimore Avenue in the Crossroads neighborhood of downtown Kansas City, was Trans World Airlines headquarters until 1964, when the airline moved to New York City.

The selection of Kansas City as the headquarters for TWA (Transcontinental Air Transport after it merged with Western Air Express, initially T&WA) was said to have been made by Charles Lindbergh. The building was designed by architects Raymond E. Bales, Jr. and Morris Schechter and built by the Long Construction Company of Kansas City; site work began in May 1955, and construction was completed on October 31, 1956. The building's exterior was decorated in TWA's signature red and white corporate colors. The three-story L-shaped commercial facility was dominated by aluminum panels and corrugated concrete paneling. It was constructed using the Youtz-Slick construction method, in which steel support beams were first erected and then concrete slabs were poured at ground level and lifted into place by hydraulic jacks; the slabs were then bolted and welded onto the beams, which allowed for a reduction in construction costs and construction time.

By 1964 TWA had become a major international figure in aviation, which prompted a move of the airline's executive offices to New York City. The 1735 Baltimore building remained the headquarters for TWA's accounting department, ticket office, credit department, and cargo department until 1969; the airline continued to use the building for training its flight attendants until opening the Breech Academy in nearby suburban Overland Park, KS in 1969.

In 2002 the TWA building was added to the National Register of Historic Places. It had been vacant for several years, though plans as late as 2003 called for it to be converted to residential condominiums under the name of TWA Lofts LLC. Instead, in early 2005, the Kansas City-based urban development firm The Nicholson Group hired local architectural firm el dorado inc to design and coordinate the restoration. Following the renovation, it was then leased to the Kansas City-based advertising agency Barkley Inc.; the agency moved into the renovated building on November 14, 2006.

== TWA Moonliner II ==
During TWA's heyday, its headquarters building was easily identified by the 22-foot-tall (6.7 m) TWA Moonliner II rocket that stood on the roof's southwest corner. It was modeled after the original 76-foot-tall (23 m), one-third scale TWA Moonliner at Disneyland's Tomorrowland attraction; TWA was the Moonliner's corporate sponsor until 1962. The Moonliner II was then removed from the building's roof by TWA's new owners, shortly after Howard Hughes sold his controlling interest in the airline. The iconic rocket was then sold to SpaceCraft, a Kansas City, MO travel-trailer company.

When SpaceCraft moved to Concordia, MO in 1970, the by then all-white Moonliner II moved with them. There it slowly fell into disrepair for the next 25 years, as it stood on a campground located nearby their travel-trailer manufacturing plant, just south of Interstate 70 between Kansas City and St. Louis. The deteriorated Moonliner replica was then sold to and carefully restored by a longtime Disney collector, until once again sporting its original red and white TWA markings. The restored Moonliner II is now on display at Kansas City's TWA Museum located at the Charles B. Wheeler Downtown Airport; at this location, the restored rocket stands about five miles (8 km) from its original TWA roof-top location.

The historic restoration of the TWA headquarters building led to the fabrication of a brand new Moonliner II replica begun in March 2006 by the Kansas City office of the Bratton Corporation. The completed replica was installed on September 29 of that year at the same southwest corner roof location as the original.

== See also ==
- TWA Administrative Offices Building
