= TWA Moonliner =

Former part of exhibit at Disneyland

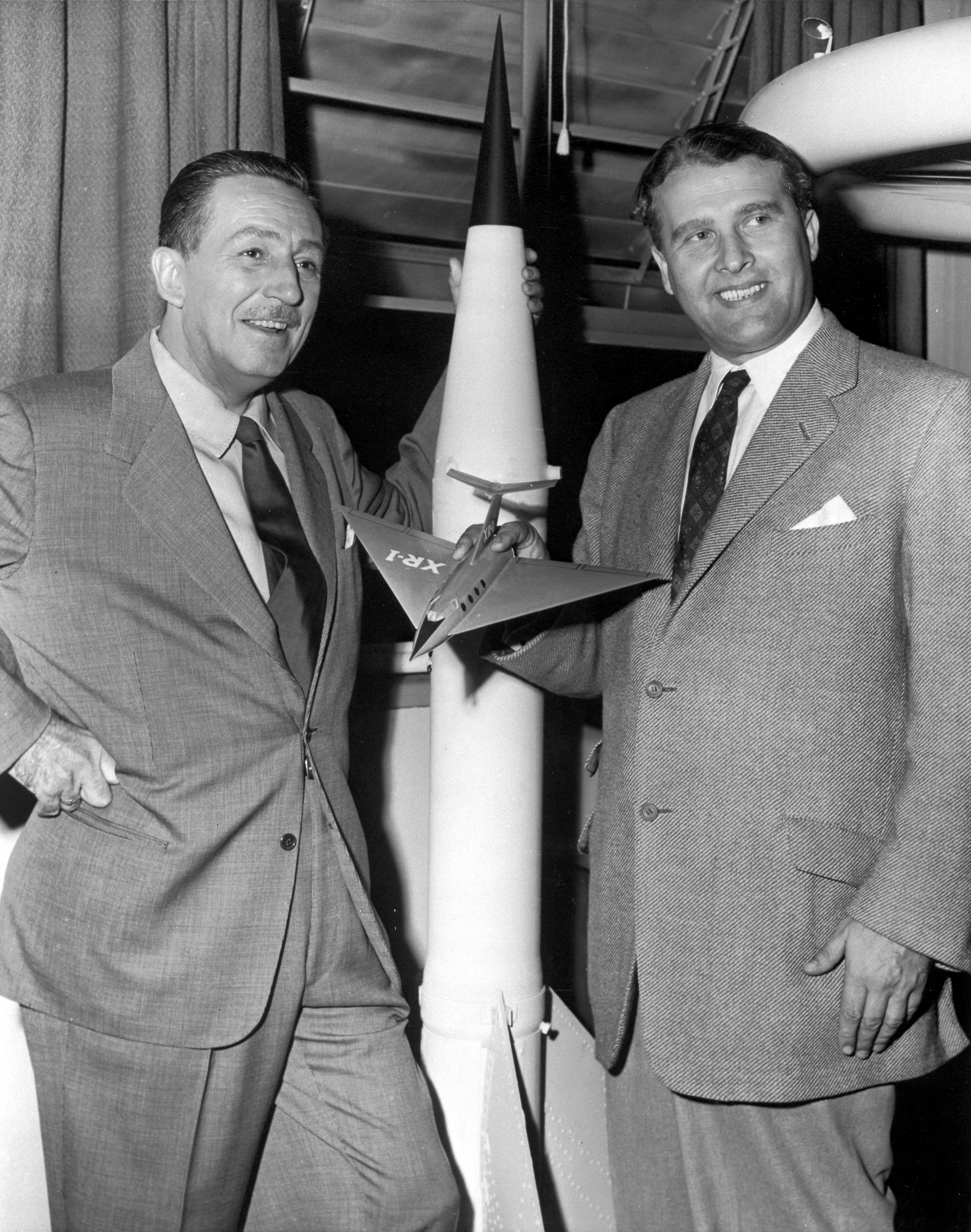
Walt Disney meets with Wernher von Braun.

From 1955 through 1962, the TWA Moonliner was part of the first futuristic exhibit located in Disneyland's Tomorrowland. It was also an early example of modern product placement advertising by TWA's Howard Hughes teaming up with Walt Disney as the Moonliner's sponsor.

At 76 feet (23 m) tall, it was the tallest structure in the theme park, 8 feet (2.4 m) taller than the Sleeping Beauty Castle. Adjoining the rocket was the "Flight to the Moon" attraction, which later became "Mission To Mars" in 1975.

The Moonliner was designed by John Hench, one of the original Disney Imagineers, with the help of German rocket scientist Wernher von Braun. It resembled von Braun's V-2 rocket design but depicted what a commercial spaceliner might look like for traveling to the Moon in the faraway year of 1986.

The Moonliner's retracting landing leg covers were said to resemble the fuselage shape on TWA's elegant Lockheed Constellation airliner; the rocket also featured portholes, a raised cockpit area, and a boarding ramp. A real Moonliner was envisioned to be powered by a nuclear reactor and actually be more than 200 feet (61 m) tall; the theme park's Moonliner was roughly a one-third scale model.

After Hughes sold his interest in TWA, the airline dropped their corporate sponsorship; the rocket then became the Douglas Moonliner when the Douglas Aircraft Company became its sponsor. This new Moonliner looked the same as the original, but the famous all-red TWA logo and stripes on the nose and landing legs were gone, replaced by a brand new paint scheme of overall white with blue stripes and a red, vertically stacked Douglas logo running down the rocket's fuselage.

The Douglas Moonliner stayed at the theme park for five more years, until 1967, when it was removed for a redesigned New Tomorrowland, making way for the Carousel of Progress and other attractions. Its fuselage was moved to a storage "boneyard" area at the northwest corner of the property and was seen there as late as 1981.

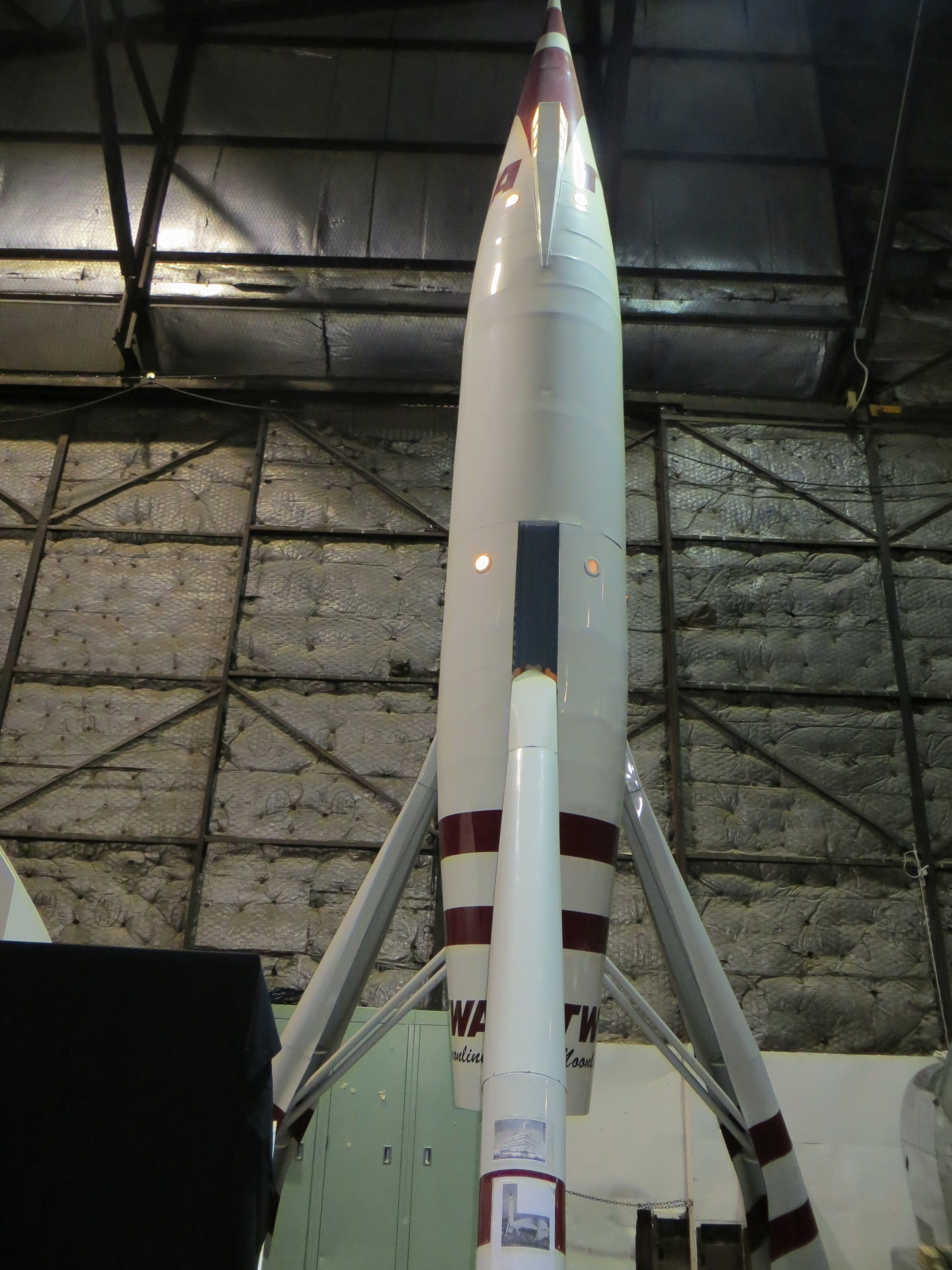
TWA's corporate "Moonliner II" replica

== TWA Moonliner II ==
In 1956 Hughes added a 22-foot-tall (6.7 m) version of the Disneyland Moonliner, known as the TWA Moonliner II, atop the southwest corner of the TWA Corporate Headquarters' Building, located at 18th Street and Baltimore, near downtown Kansas City, MO. When Hughes and Disney ended their business partnership in 1961 after Hughes sold TWA, the airline's management removed the Moonliner II from its roof and sold it in 1962 to a local RV company called SpaceCraft.

SpaceCraft moved the now all-white Moonliner in 1970 to Concordia, MO, where it landed near the south side of Interstate 70, between Kansas City and St. Louis, MO, where SpaceCraft operated its assembly plant; it slowly rusted on that spot for more than 25 years. In 1997 a Columbia, MO lawyer, who collected Disney memorabilia, bought the deteriorating Moonliner II and then began a long, careful restoration process, eventually bringing it back to its 1956 condition and sporting its original red and white TWA paint scheme. The rocket is currently on loan to the National Airline History Museum at the Charles B. Wheeler Downtown Airport, in Kansas City, MO, where it stands very near an original, fully restored to flight status, TWA Super "G" Constellation airliner; the Moonliner II is located about five miles from its original TWA rooftop location.

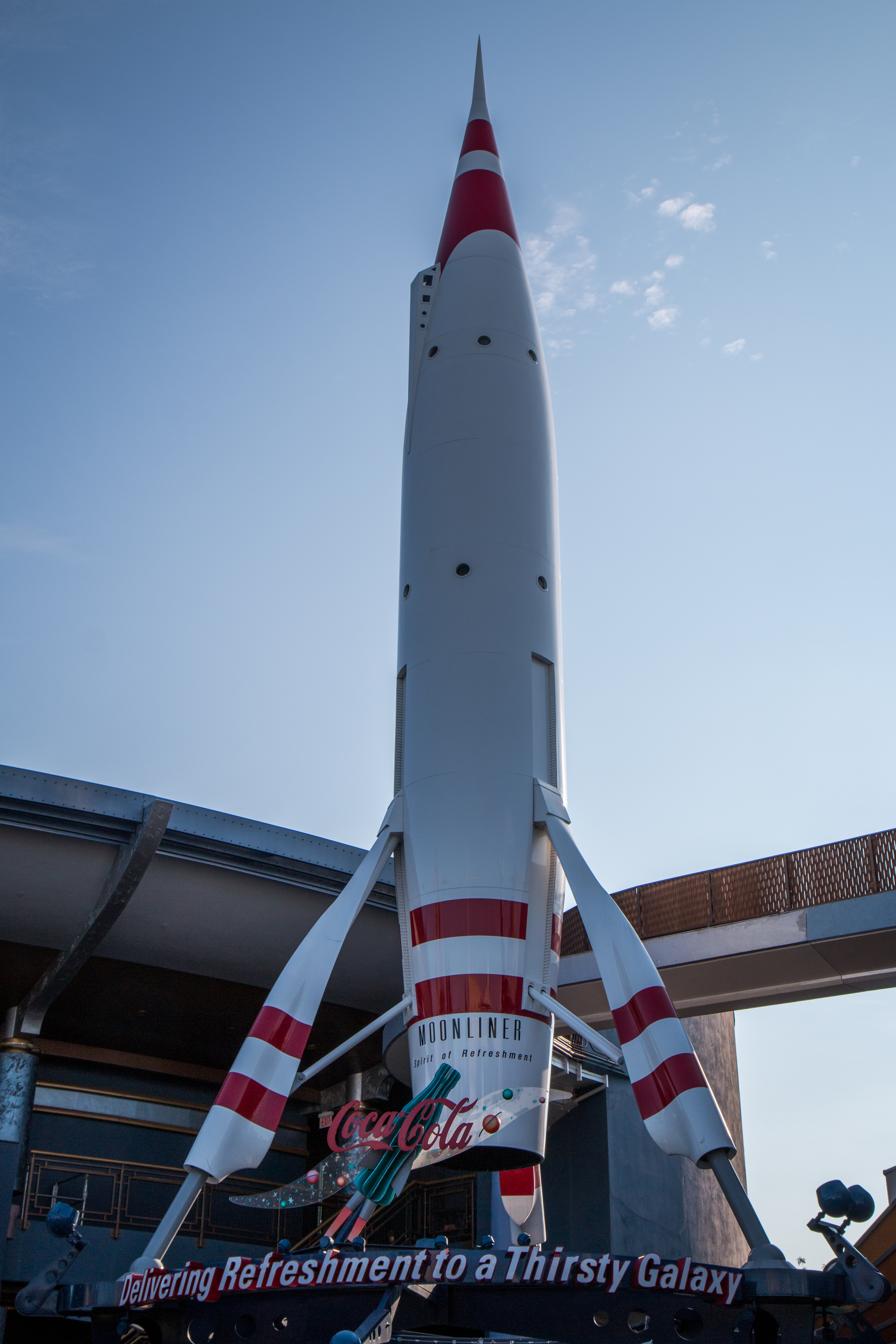
The Moonliner III

== Moonliner III ==
In 1998 a new but scaled-down version of the park's original Moonliner was added as part of the New Tomorrowland, complete with the familiar red stripes of the now defunct TWA. Today, this one-third smaller Moonliner is used to promote Coca-Cola "Delivering Refreshment to a Thirsty Galaxy"; it sits next to the building that once housed the "Flight to the Moon" attraction, which is now Alien Pizza Planet.

== Moonliner IV (Moonliner II replica) ==
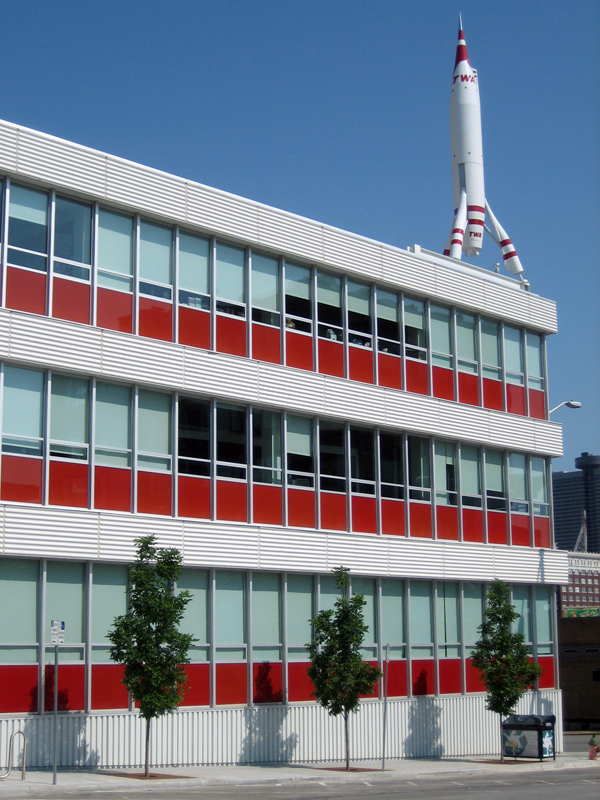
TWA Moonliner IV atop the southwest corner of the restored TWA Corporate Headquarters building in Kansas City, Missouri, United States

In early 2005, the Nicholson Group, a Kansas City, Missouri urban development firm, hired local architectural firm, El Dorado Inc, to design and oversee the historic restoration of the TWA corporate headquarters building, complete with a replica Moonliner II. The Bratton Corporation was contracted in early 2006 to fabricate a brand new TWA Moonliner II replica for the building's roof. This new, fully illuminated rocket was completed and then installed on September 29 of that year at the very same southwest corner roof location as the original Moonliner II. The TWA building was then leased to Kansas City-based advertising agency Barkley, Inc., and the agency moved in on November 14, 2006. The area surrounding the TWA building is known as Kansas City's Crossroads Arts District.
