= John Francisco Richards II =

- Born: John Francisco Richards II; July 31, 1896; Kansas City, Missouri; United States
- Died: September 26, 1918 (aged 22) near Varennes-en-Argonne; France
- Education: Yale University
- Occupation: First lieutenant in the 1st Aero Squadron
- Employer: United States Air Force
- Known for: Namesake of Richards Field and Richards-Gebaur Air Force Base
- Parent(s): George Blackwell Richards; Belle (Hastings) Richards
- Relatives: John Francisco Richards (grandfather)

John Francisco Richards II (born 3 July 31, 1896, Kansas City, Missouri; died September 26, 1918, near Varennes, France) was a first lieutenant in the 1st Aero Squadron, who was shot down during the Meuse-Argonne Offensive in World War I.

Richards Field, the first airport in the Kansas City metropolitan area was named for him. Its follow up Kansas City Downtown Airport was originally called New Richards Field. The road serving it is called Richards Road. Richards-Gebaur Air Force Base was also named for him.

His grandfather, John Francisco Richards, founded the Richards & Conover Hardware Company in Kansas City.

He graduated with BA from Yale University in 1917, where he was the circulation manager of campus humor magazine The Yale Record. His letters were published after the war.
