= National Museum of Commercial Aviation =

Former aviation museum in Forest Part, Georgia, USA

- Location within Metro Atlanta
- Established: 9 January 2006
- Dissolved: 7 December 2016
- Location: Forest Park, Georgia, south of Atlanta's Hartsfield-Jackson International Airport
- Coordinates: 33.606748°N 84.393344°W
- Website: https://nationalairlinemuseum.org/

The National Museum of Commercial Aviation (NMCA) was the nation's first comprehensive airline industry museum in the United States. It was located in Forest Park, Georgia, just south of Atlanta and Hartsfield-Jackson International Airport. It was founded in 2006 by Executive Director & Chief Curator Grant Wainscott. It was a public 501(c)3 not-for-profit organization, and was governed by a 12-member Board of Trustees, chaired by Captain Chuck Maire Jr. The NMCA was a collaborative effort between the non-profit Museum, local and regional governments, and hundreds of business, aviation, and community partners throughout the country. The museum was closed with intentions of moving to a new location, but never reopened. The museum dissolved as an organization in 2016.

== History ==
In 2003, a group of retired airline employees and civic leaders met to discuss creating a legacy to the commercial airlines that helped make Atlanta home to the busiest airport in the world. From this initial conversation, group was formed, resulting in what became known as the National Museum of Commercial Aviation (NMCA).

The NMCA was intended to be a comprehensive airline industry museum, and was poised to become a center for airline history and research. It was designed to become a major tourism attraction and economic generator for the region, and to serve as a cultural and educational amenity. The museum intended to look at all aspects of the airline industry, not just one particular airline or airport, covering everything from the birth of the airline industry to modern labor relations; from air mail to air cargo; highlighting every job in the industry and its value. It also intended to preserve the artifacts and stories of the men and women who built the industry to what it is today.

In 2007, the museum announced south metro Atlanta as its permanent home, followed by a major operating grant award from Clayton County, Georgia to assist with planning, research, and other operating needs. The first Interim Headquarters & Research Air-Chive was opened in Forest Park, Georgia in March 2008. The Interim H.Q. was designed to act as both temporary museum and sales center to give the public an idea of what to expect further down the road.

More than 4,000 visitors came through the doors in the first 14 months open, and the demand for public programming, group tours, children's educational programming and additional exhibits necessitated a move into a much larger facility adjacent to the existing site. That location served as the center of operations for the museum. The Interim Museum was open to the public, and contained various airline exhibits, an art gallery, children's activity center, research library, flight simulators and a gift shop. Educational and public programming efforts included a children's book club, monthly lecture series, traveling exhibits, and a rotating art gallery.

The first phase of the Permanent Campus, located at 727 Airline Museum Way, Atlanta, Georgia 30354, was a 16,000 sq ft (1,500 m^{2}) hangar which was intended to house twelve new exhibits, cockpits, ground support equipment, the museum's collection, staff, and volunteers. It was expected to open in 2013.

== Facilities ==
Adjacent to the entrance corridor of the new international at the world's busiest airport, and in the shadow of the world's largest airline, the museum intended to break ground on the first phase of what was to become a 150,000 sq ft (14,000 m^{2}) campus of buildings, aircraft, support vehicles, interactive exhibits, educational classrooms and learning labs, and memorial gardens.

Good visibility from more than 800 feet of frontage on Interstate 75, access to the airport, and many aviation employees in the immediate area were to add to the feasibility of a "national" museum. Main buildings were to include a themed airport terminal covering the major decades of aviation, complete with loading bridges and full-size commercial airliners outside. Adjacent hangars and a Career Exploration & Learning Center were to contain additional aircraft, classrooms and career exploration areas, theaters, archives, collections storage, a themed cafeteria, and a restoration/maintenance shop.

== Collection ==
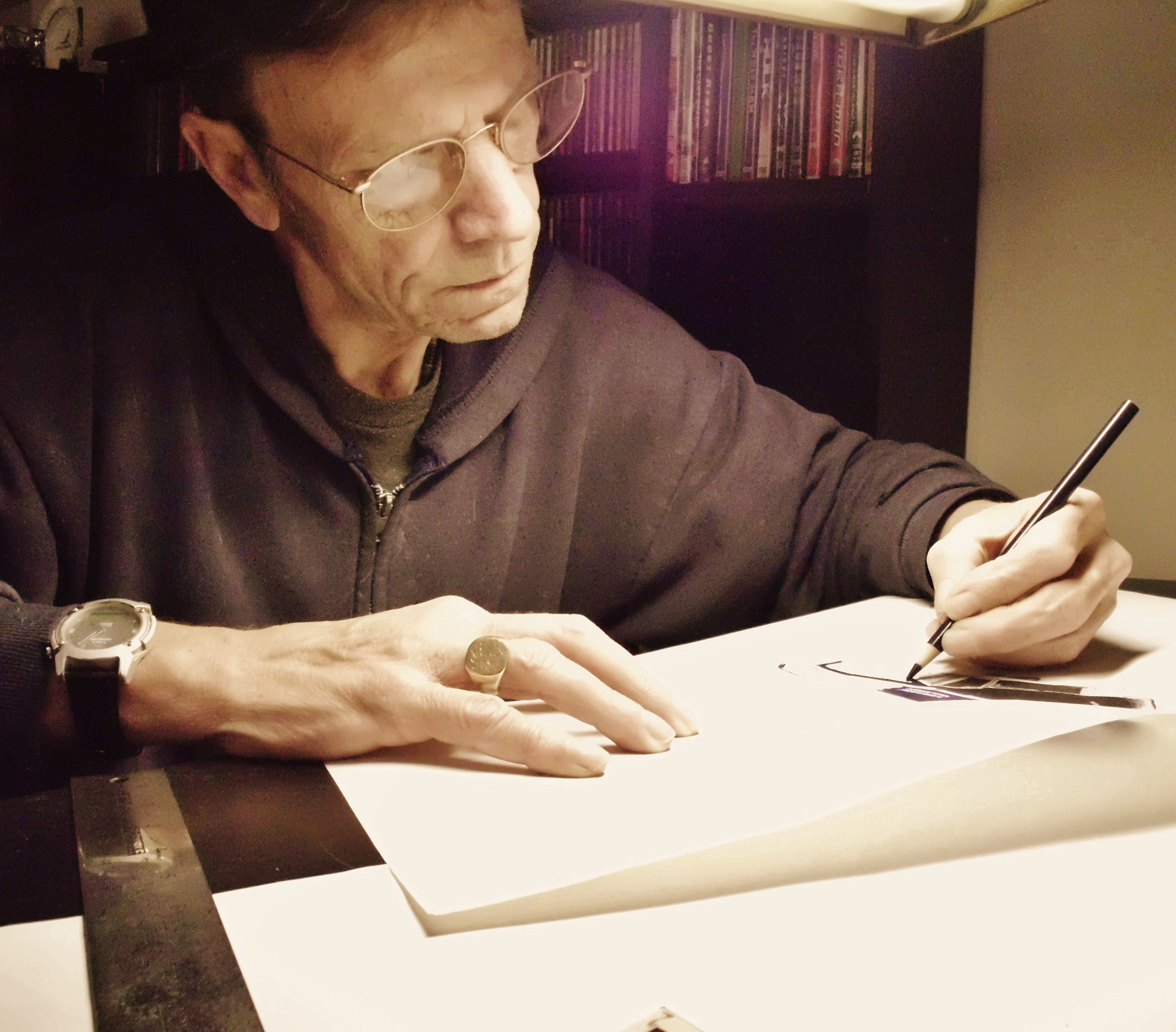
Marc Y. Chenevert

The museum had a growing collection of more than 100,000 artifacts. Major concentrations included 500 uniforms dating as far back as the 1930s, advertising memorabilia, rare cockpits and trainers, 2,500 pieces of in-flight serving ware, vintage toys and models, and original artwork.

Most noteworthy in the collection were the world's only known Martin 404 Cockpit Procedures Trainer (CPT) in Southern Airways livery, TUG Technologies first TUG Tractor, and the cockpit of an ex-Eastern Air Lines Martin 404, later owned by Ray Charles. The museum's aircraft collection included a former United Airlines/FedEx Express Boeing 727, and a former FedEx Express/Mountain Air Cargo Fokker F-27 Friendship.

In 2013, aviation airliner artist Marc Y. Chenevert began searching for a repository to donate his airliner and art collection. Associates suggested to Chenevert that he contact the National Museum of Commercial Aviation and was introduced to Richard Grigg, NMCA Curator. The museum was interested in Marc's aviation collection and in August 2013, Grigg traveled to Chenevert's home in Asheville, North Carolina to accept the donation of his non-Braniff International Airways airliner drawings Collection. The museum was also to receive Chenevert's drawing desk and tools that he has used since the early 1970s. Chenevert's Braniff International Airways Collection has been donated to Braniff Flying Colors Collection based in Dallas, Texas.

== See also ==
- National Airline History Museum
