= Richards Field =

- IATA: none; ICAO: none

Summary
- Airport type: Public-use (historical)
- Owner/Operator: Private
- Serves: Kansas City
- Location: Kansas City, Missouri/Raytown, Missouri
- Opened: 1922
- Closed: 1949
- Passenger services ceased: 1949
- Time zone: CST (UTC−06:00)
  - Summer (DST): CDT (UTC−05:00)
- Coordinates: 38°59′41″N 94°28′34″W

Map
- Location in Missouri Richards Field (the United States)

Richards Field was the first airport in the Kansas City metropolitan area. The field was established in 1922 near the border between Kansas City, Missouri, and Raytown, Missouri, at the southeast corner of Blue Ridge Boulevard and Gregory Boulevard. It was named for John Francisco Richards II, a Kansas City aviator killed in World War I. The airport was visited by Charles Lindbergh.

== History ==
=== Establishment ===
Richards Field was established in 1922 as Kansas City's first commercial airport by Major Howard Wehrle, Fred Harvey, Simpson Yeomans, Roger Crittenden, and Robert Lester. The airport was strategically located at the intersection of Blue Ridge Boulevard and Gregory Boulevard, on the border between Kansas City and Raytown, Missouri.

The field was named in honor of First Lieutenant John Francisco Richards II (July 31, 1896 – September 26, 1918), who was shot down during the Meuse-Argonne Offensive in World War I while serving in the 1st Aero Squadron. Richards was the first Kansas City officer to die while in the Army flying service.In 1927, Kansas City built Kansas City Downtown Airport, which was briefly called New Richards Field and then became Kansas City Municipal Airport. Richards' name was to be used for Richards-Gebaur Air Force Base.

After the downtown airport was built, the Raytown airport became known as Ong Field for aviator William Ong. The airport was abandoned in 1949 and became a subdivision called Gregory Heights, with Ong Lake in the 1950s. A historical marker/plaque can be found at 9063 Gregory Blvd, Raytown, MO, marking the spot of the old airfield.
