= Charles B. Wheeler Downtown Airport =

Airport in Missouri, United States

- IATA: MKC; ICAO: KMKC; FAA LID: MKC

Summary
- Airport type: Public
- Owner/Operator: Kansas City Aviation Department
- Serves: Kansas City, Missouri
- Elevation AMSL: 757 ft (231 m)
- Coordinates: 39°07′23″N 094°35′34″W
- Website: www.FlyMKC.com

Map
- Location MKC (the United States)

Runways
Direction	Length		Surface
Direction	ft	m	Surface
1/19	6,827	2,081	Concrete
3/21	5,050	1,539	Asphalt

Statistics (2022)
- Aircraft operations: 114,975
- Based aircraft: 176
- Source: Federal Aviation Administration

Charles B. Wheeler Downtown Airport (IATA: MKC, ICAO: KMKC, FAA LID: MKC) is a city-owned, public-use airport serving Kansas City, Missouri, United States. Located in Clay County, this facility is included in the National Plan of Integrated Airport Systems, which categorized it as a general aviation reliever airport.

== History ==
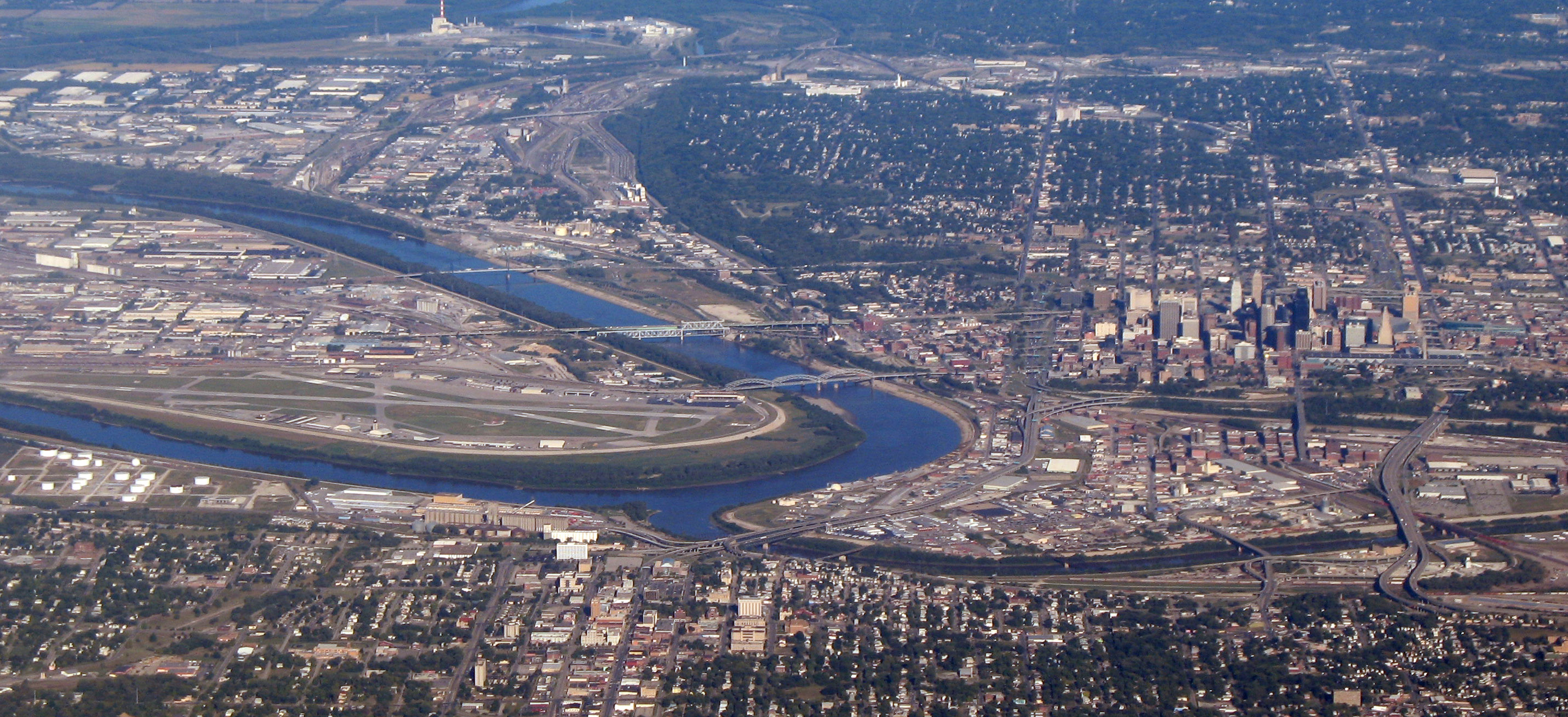
The city considered calling the airport "Peninsula Field" because of the sharp bend in the Missouri River around the airport.

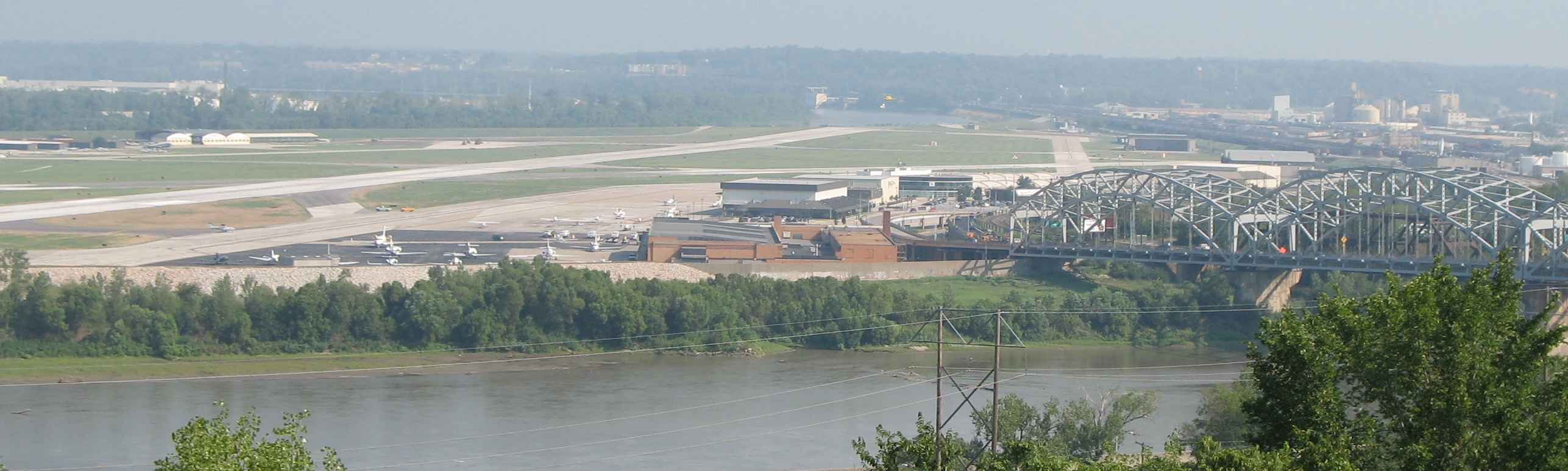
The airport from Quality Hill. The Buck O'Neil Bridge is on the right. The Fairfax Assembly plant (the former Fairfax Airport) is the big building across the Missouri River on the left.

This airport replaced the old Richards Field, located near Raytown, Missouri, as Kansas City's main airport. It was dedicated as New Richards Field in 1927 by Charles Lindbergh and was soon renamed Kansas City Municipal Airport. Its prominent tenant was Trans World Airlines (TWA), which was headquartered in Kansas City. The airport was built in the Missouri River bottoms next to the rail tracks at the Hannibal Bridge. At the time, air travel was considered to be handled in conjunction with rail traffic.

The airport had limited area for expansion (Fairfax Airport across the Missouri River in Kansas City, Kansas, covered a larger area). Airplanes had to avoid the 200-foot (60 m) Quality Hill and the Downtown Kansas City skyline south of the south end of the main runway. In the early 1960s, an FAA memo called it "the most dangerous major airport in the country" and urged that no further federal funds be spent on it. A new airport was then constructed to serve Kansas City, being the Kansas City International Airport (MCI) which was opened in 1972 with all scheduled passenger airline flights being moved from MKC to MCI at that time.

The April 1957 Official Airline Guide (OAG) listed the following weekday departures from MKC:

- Braniff International Airways - 40
- Trans World Airlines (TWA) - 39
- Continental Airlines - 9
- United Airlines - 4
- Delta Air Lines - 2
- Ozark Airlines - 2
- Central Airlines - 2

The downtown airport has been renamed for Charles Wheeler who was mayor when Kansas City International opened. Richards Road, which serves the airport, is named for John Francisco Richards II, a Kansas City airman killed in World War I (and whose name was also applied to Richards Field and Richards-Gebaur Air Force Base).

Today the airport is used for corporate and recreational aviation. The terminal building today houses VML, a global advertising and marketing agency headquartered in Kansas City. Its location near downtown has excellent highway access.

It is home to the National Airline History Museum. Though this museum primarily contains artifacts from TWA (due to the fact that most of its volunteers are local retired TWA employees), it is dedicated to airline history in general. A second museum, The TWA Museum, is housed in the original terminal that it was founded in at 10 Richards Road and is dedicated to the history of TWA. The airport also hosts the Aviation Expo (Air Show), most years, usually in August.

== Facilities and aircraft ==
The airport covers 700 acres (283 ha) at an elevation of 757 feet (231 m). It has two runways. Runway 1/19 is 6,827 by 150 feet (2,081 x 46 m) concrete with an EMAS at both ends. Runway 3/21 is 5,050 by 100 feet (1,539 x 30 m) asphalt.

Construction on runway 1-19 is complete and both runways are in use to their full length.

Taxiway H was at one time part of runway 17/35, which was closed after an FAA decision on the required separation between terminal buildings and the runway.

The airport is on the north side of the confluence of the Kansas River and Missouri River. Levees protected the airport relatively well during the Great Flood of 1951 and the Great Flood of 1993 although there was standing water. The 1951 flood devastated the Fairfax airport and caused Kansas City to build what would become Kansas City International Airport away from the river to keep the TWA overhaul base in the area after it had been destroyed in the flood at Fairfax.

On October 17, 2006, the Kansas City, Missouri, Aviation Department announced plans to build a $20 million aircraft hangar complex at the Charles B. Wheeler Downtown Airport including: 122 T-hangars, 13 box hangars, a 40,000-square-foot (4,000 m^{2}) terminal building with offices, a pilots' lounge, meeting rooms and a destination restaurant.

In the year ending September 30, 2022, the airport had 114,975 aircraft operations, average 315 per day: 77% general aviation, 21% air taxi, 2.2% military, and <1% commercial. 176 aircraft were then based at the airport: 76 single-engine and 23 multi-engine airplanes, 66 jet airplanes, and 11 helicopters.

== Accidents and incidents ==
- On November 4, 1942, a Trans World Airlines Douglas DC-3 taking off from MKC collided with a USAAF Douglas C-53 preparing to land at the airport collided at 3,000 feet. Despite the collision, both damaged aircraft made it to the ground and all survived.
- On July 12, 1955, a Trans World Airlines Douglas DC-3 on a training flight collided with a Cessna 140 on approach to a touch-and-go at nearby Fairfax Municipal Airport, now defunct. The Cessna crashed and killed both occupants but the DC-3 landed safely at Fairfax Airport. The DC-3 was substantially damaged but later repaired and placed back into service.
- On May 22, 1962, Continental Airlines Flight 11, a Boeing 707 en route from Chicago O'Hare International Airport to Kansas City Downtown Airport exploded over Unionville, Missouri. All 45 on board were killed.
- On January 29, 1963, Continental Airlines Flight 290, a Vickers Viscount, crashed on approach at the end of runway 18 because of accretion of ice on the horizontal stabilizer causing a loss of pitch control. All 3 crew and 5 passengers were killed.
- On July 1, 1965, Continental Airlines Flight 12, a Boeing 707-124 registered as N70773, suffered a runway excursion during landing at the airport due to hydroplaning. No one out of the 66 occupants onboard lost their lives, however, five were injured.
- On September 13, 1965, a Trans World Airlines Convair CV-880 on a training flight reached a maximum speed of 146 knots after lift-off, began to decay, then began buffeting with the nose and a right 25 degree bank, then impacted the ground. All 4 occupants survived, but the aircraft was destroyed and written off.
- On January 9, 1985, a Lockheed L-188 Electra operated by TPI International Airways, a cargo flight, crashed after missing a missed approach at MKC. The aircraft climbed to 3,100 feet, then stalled and crashed into a public water treatment plant 5 km NW of Wheeler Airport. All 3 occupants were killed.
- On January 28, 2005, a Learjet 35 operated by Million Air was damaged substantially during a landing overrun at MKC at night with a runway contaminated by snow. Both occupants survived but the aircraft was written off.
- On August 20, 2011, pilot Bryan Jensen was killed when his Vertical Unlimited 12 (a modified Pitts 12) crashed during the Kansas City Air Expo.
- On August 5, 2013, a construction contractor working on a taxiway near runway 1 discovered human remains buried in the ground.

== See also ==
- List of airports in Missouri
- Missouri World War II Army Airfields
