= Runway excursion =

Aircraft runway accident

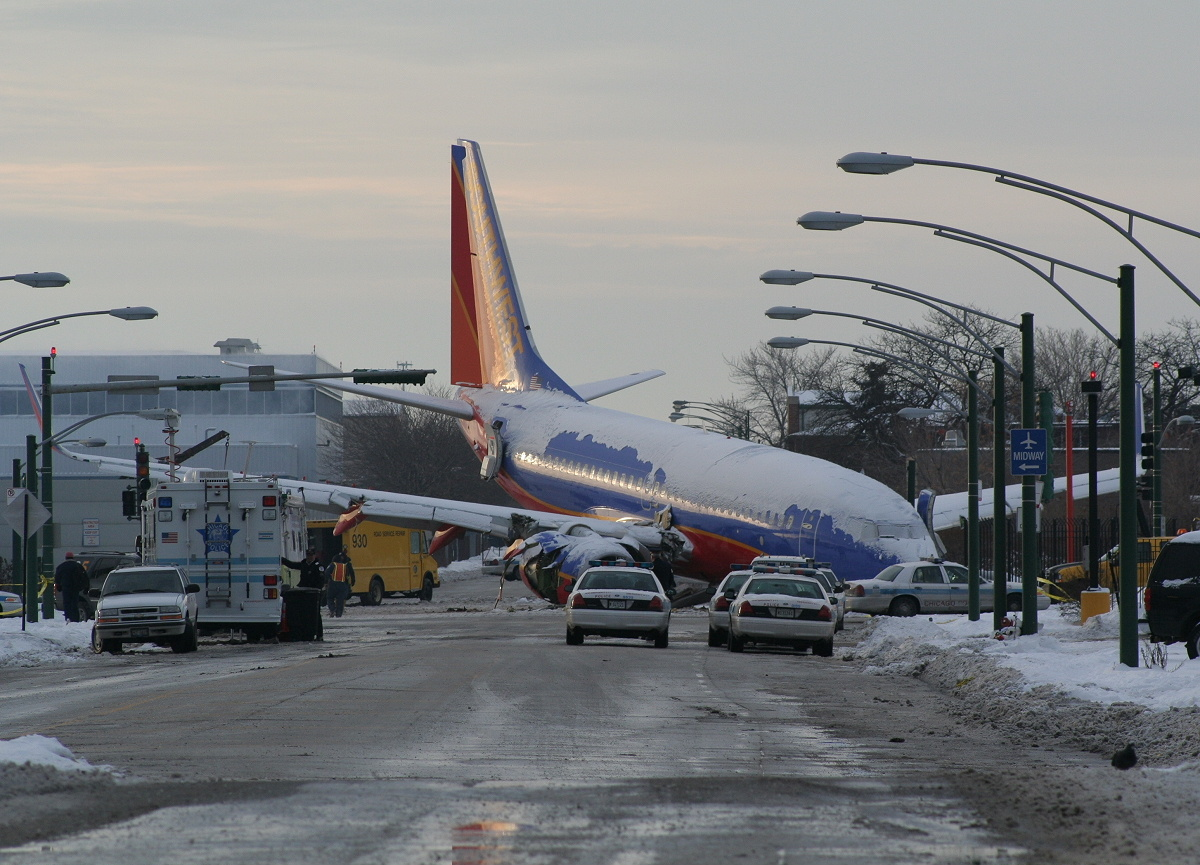
Southwest Airlines Flight 1248 after a runway excursion at Chicago Midway Airport

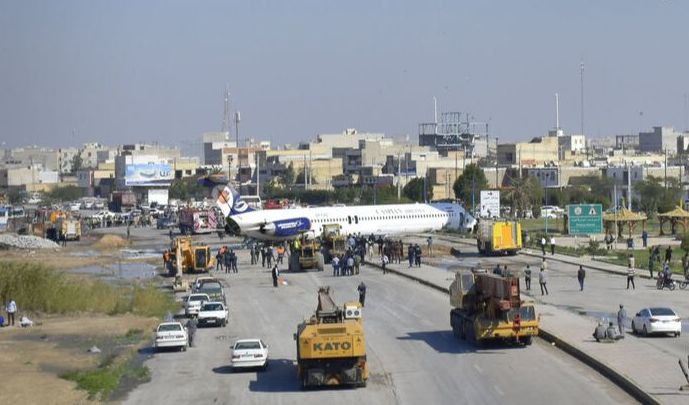
Caspian Airlines Flight 6936 ended on a major road after a runway excursion at Mahshahr Airport, Iran

A runway excursion is a runway safety incident in which an aircraft makes an inappropriate exit from the runway. This happens mainly due to late landings or inappropriate runway choice.

There are several types of runway excursions:

- A departing aircraft fails to become airborne or is unsuccessful in rejecting takeoff before reaching the end of the designated runway.
- A landing aircraft is unable to stop before the end of the designated runway is reached, causing it to keep moving and leave the runway.
- An aircraft taking off, rejecting takeoff or landing departs the side of the designated runway, not airborne.

When an aircraft exits the end of the runway, this is referred to as runway overrun (or informally, runway overshoot). Runway excursions can happen because of pilot error, poor weather, or a fault with the aircraft.

According to the Flight Safety Foundation, as of 2008, runway excursions were the most frequent type of landing accident, slightly ahead of runway incursion. For runway accidents recorded between 1995 and 2007, 96% of runway accidents and 80% of accidents with fatalities involved runway excursions.

== Management and prevention ==
Efforts to address runway excursion either focus on preventing runway excursions, or on minimizing the amount of damage or injury caused by a runway excursion. In the latter category, aviation safety regulators may establish standards such as minimum runway safety areas intended to allow adequate time and distance for an aircraft to stop in the event of a runway excursion.

=== Runway widening and extension ===
A key aspect of preventing runway excursions is providing runways of sufficient length and width to accommodate the aircraft used at an airport. In the 1960s, the advent of jet airliners such as the Boeing 707, which operate at faster speeds including at takeoff and landing relative to earlier propeller-driven airliners, required longer runways. In the mid-1960s, the Federal Aviation Administration (FAA) proposed increasing minimum runway length requirements by 800 feet (240 m) at all U.S. airports with jet airliner service, extending to 1,200 feet (370 m) feet in rain or snow conditions. However, these requirements would have necessitated building extending runways or even building new airports in some cities. After strong industry response, the FAA withdrew the proposal and instead only mandated a fifteen per cent increase to minimum runway length during wet or slippery landing conditions.

Preventing runway excursions can necessitate building new airports, when there is not room to expand existing runways. On July 1, 1965, Continental Airlines Flight 12 (a Boeing 707) overran the runway while landing in rain and high winds at Kansas City Municipal Airport. Investigators ruled out pilot error, and determined it would have been impossible to stop the aircraft in the available runway length. Extending the 7,000-foot (2,100 m) runway was not possible due to space limitations surrounding the urban airport, and construction on Kansas City International Airport north of the city was approved the next year, opening in 1972 with runways 9,500 feet (2,900 m) and 9,000 feet (2,700 m) in length.

=== Engineered materials arrestor system ===
Airports such as LaGuardia Airport in Queens, New York, may lack adequate space to meet runway safety area standards. As a result, in the 1990s, the FAA began conducting research on new technology to rapidly stop aircraft in less than 1,000 feet (300 m) in the event of a runway overrun.

The engineered materials arrestor system (EMAS) was developed as a high energy absorbing material that could be installed as a surface beyond the end of runways, which was designed to collapse under the weight of an aircraft (absorbing energy and slowing the plane in the process) in the event of an overrun. Installation of EMAS at LaGuardia Airport started in 2005 and finished in 2015. In October 2016, a Boeing 737 aircraft with 37 people aboard, including Republican vice-presidential candidate Mike Pence, overran the runway while landing at LaGuardia. EMAS was credited with bringing the plane to a stop safely and with no serious damage or casualties.

As of December 2020, EMAS has been installed at more than 100 runway end locations at more than 50 commercial airports in the United States, and has safely stopped 15 aircraft involved in runway overruns.

=== Flight systems technology ===
Airbus is developing the Runway Overrun Prevention System, a flight systems technology intended to prevent runway overruns by increasing pilots' situational awareness and enhancing automation during landings.

=== Runway condition assessment ===
Takeoff and Landing Performance Assessment (TALPA) was introduced in 2016, whereby airport operators report Runway Condition Codes (RWYCC) for take-off and landing.

== Notable runway excursions ==
The following list includes runway excursions, which are notable because they resulted in fatalities, aircraft destruction, or substantial aviation safety changes or improvements.

Event	Year	Location	Description
British European Airways Flight 609	1958	Munich-Riem Airport, Munich, West Germany	The Airspeed Ambassador crashed on its third attempt to take off at Munich-Riem Airport due to runway slush. The flight was carrying the Manchester United football team back home, along with supporters and journalists, from a European Cup match in Belgrade, Yugoslavia (now Serbia). There were 44 people on board, 20 of whom died at the scene. Three more injured died at hospital, resulting in 23 fatalities with 21 survivors.
Trans Caribbean Airways Flight 505	1970	Harry S. Truman Airport, St. Thomas, United States Virgin Islands	The Boeing 727-2A7 operating the flight bounced multiple times after the crew let the aircraft stall above the runway. The right main landing gear collapsed as the aircraft overran the runway, hitting a truck, and sliding up a hill. 2 of the 55 occupants were killed.
TAP Air Portugal Flight 425	1977	Cristiano Ronaldo International Airport, Portugal	A Boeing 727 operating the service overran the airport's runway before crashing onto the nearby beach and exploding, killing 131 of the 164 people on board. It remains TAP's only fatal accident in its history. The runway was 5,200 ft (1,600 m) long at the time of the crash. It would be extended in 1986 to 5,900 ft (1,800 m) and again in 2000 to 9,124 ft (2,781 m).
Avianca flight	1980	Mariscal Sucre International Airport, Quito, Ecuador	The Boeing 720-059B landed too fast (143 knots instead of 123 kts) and too far down the runway ( 300 m down), overrunning it by 70 m and collapsing the nosegear. No injuries were reported, but the plane was written off.
Faucett Perú flight	1989	Coronel FAP Francisco Secada Vignetta International Airport, Iquitos, Peru	The Boeing 737-200 (OB-R-1314) veered off the runway and lost its second (right) engine after failing to stop while landing during a heavy tropical rainstorm. There were no fatalities among the 130 passengers and crew, but 14 people were injured, and the aircraft was destroyed in an ensuing fire.
American Airlines Flight 102	1993	Dallas Fort Worth International Airport, Dallas–Fort Worth metroplex, United States	Landing in stormy conditions with a crosswind, a McDonnell Douglas DC-10 began to weathervane, and the captain failed to use sufficient rudder control to regain the proper ground track. The plane departed the right side of the runway. All 202 occupants on board survived, with 2 passengers suffering serious injuries during the emergency evacuation. The aircraft was badly damaged and was written off.
Tajikistan Airlines flight	1993	Khorog Airport, Tajikistan	The non-scheduled domestic passenger Yakovlev Yak-40 flight was forcibly overloaded by militants during the civil war in Tajikistan, with the crew taking more passengers than the aircraft was able to carry, which led to an excess takeoff weight. Unable to take off, the aircraft overran the runway at high speed, struck several obstacles and fell into the Panj River, killing 82 people on board (including 14 children). It is the deadliest accident involving a Yakovlev Yak-40 and the deadliest aviation accident in Tajikistan.
Lufthansa Flight 2904	1993	Warsaw Chopin Airport, Poland	The Airbus A320 operated by Lufthansa overran the runway at Warsaw Chopin Airport due to pilot error and hit an embankment. The training captain and one of the 64 passengers died and 56 out of the 64 survivors were injured. The aircraft was destroyed
China Airlines Flight 605	1993	Kai Tak Airport, Hong Kong	To avoid a runway overrun and collision with the approach light system, the captain of a Boeing 747-400 deliberately veered the plane off the left side of the runway and into Victoria Harbour. No one was killed, but the plane was written off.
Viasa Flight 940	1993	Ezeiza Airport, Argentina	Inbound from Caracas, the aircraft started aquaplaning immediately after touchdown in bad weather. It overran the runway threshold by 180 m (590 ft) and the nosegear collapsed, causing both port and starboard engines to strike the ground.
Servicios Aéreos Amazónicos Flight 2079	1994	Saposoa Airport, Peru	The Yakovlev Yak-40 crashed into a river after overrunning the airstrip during landing due to an apparent flight crew conflict over the decision to land in heavy rain and poor visual conditions; the aircraft ultimately touched down half on the wet dirt strip, depriving it of enough space to brake, and leading to the accident. Of the 31 occupants (26 passengers and 5 crew) 5 passengers and the Ukrainian instructor pilot died.
Nigeria Airways Flight 357	1995	Kaduna International Airport, Nigeria	The aircraft suffered a wing strike after a long, tailwind landing at Kaduna Airport, inbound from Jos. The starboard wing hit the ground after the aircraft veered off the runway to the left, damaging the fuel tanks and starting a fire that engulfed the fuselage. All 14 crew members survived, while 11 of the 124 passengers died.
Air Africa (Moscow Airways)	1996	N'Dolo Airport, Zaire (now DR Congo)	An overloaded Antonov An-32B overran the runway at after attempting to take-off on an illegal arms-smuggling flight for Angolan rebels and ploughed into Kinshasa's Simbazikita street market. Four of the six crew of the aircraft survived the accident, but between 225 and 348 people died, with more than 500 injured. It remained the deadliest aviation accident in African history until the 2018 Algerian Air Force Ilyushin Il-76 crash, the deadliest in the Democratic Republic of the Congo, and the deadliest in terms of ground fatalities, only superseded by the intentional crashes of American Airlines Flight 11 and United Airlines Flight 175 in the September 11 attacks, and thus the deadliest accident in terms of ground fatalities.
Fly Linhas Aéreas Flight 7747	1996	Mariscal Sucre International Airport, Ecuador	The crew of an overloaded Boeing 727 charter flight, carrying the Brazilian Corinthians football back to Brazil after playing a Copa Libertadores match, rejected take-off in rainy conditions. The plane hit the ILS installation and then a perimeter wall before coming to rest between a nearby avenue and the airport terrain. There were no fatalities among the 79 passengers and 11 crew, but six people were injured and the plane was written off.
Garuda Indonesia Flight 865	1996	Fukuoka Airport, Japan	The McDonnell Douglas DC-10-30 overran the runway after aborting takeoff following an uncontained failure of its third engine. Three of the 275 people on board were killed and the crash was blamed on pilot error and improper maintenance.
Varig Flight 265	1997	Carajás Airport, Parauapebas, Brazil	The Boeing 737-200, registered as PP-CJO, flying from Marabá veered off the right side of the runway at Carajás during a thunderstorm after its right main landing gear collapsed rearwards. The aircraft ended up in a wooded area and one crew member died.
Aerogal (ferry flight)	1997	Chachoan Airport, Ambato, Ecuador	The Fairchild FH-227D operated a repositioning ferry flight with staff and equipment from Quito's Mariscal Sucre International Airport to Chachoan. Due to poor-to-no preparation to fly into this high-elevation airfield, the plane touched down halfway down the runway at high speed (at 100 knots), overran it by 170 meters, and fell into a 90-meter-deep ravine. There were no casualties among the seven occupants but the plane was written off. The plane had been briefly used in 1992 for photoshoot purposes for the 1993 movie Alive, painted in the livery of the ill-fated Uruguayan Air Force Flight 571.
Sudanese Air Force flight	1998	Nasir Airport, Sudan (today South Sudan)	The Antonov An-32 carrying 51 on board, overrun the runway after landing during bad weather, crashing into a river, killing 26 of the 57 on board, among them several of the country's most senior government leaders, including the Vice-President Zubair Mohamed Salih.
Philippine Airlines Flight 137	1998	Bacolod City Domestic Airport, Bacolod, Philippines	The Airbus A320-214 overran the runway due to pilot error and crashed into a residential area. There were no fatalities out of the 130 passengers and crew on board the aircraft, but three people on the ground were killed, and there were many injuries. The aircraft was written off as a loss.
Cubana de Aviación Flight 389	1998	Mariscal Sucre International Airport, Quito, Ecuador	The Tupolev Tu-154 with 91 occupants overran the runway after aborting takeoff due to pilot error. It hit an ILS tower and crashed into a residential area after hitting the airport perimeter wall. Seventy people on board the aircraft were killed, plus ten on the ground were killed, with several people injured. The aircraft was destroyed.
American Airlines Flight 1420	1999	Little Rock National Airport, Little Rock, Arkansas, U.S.	A McDonnell Douglas MD-82 overran the runway, crashed into an approach lighting structure, and broke apart, killing 11 of the 145 occupants.
LAPA Flight 3142	1999	Aeroparque Jorge Newbery, Buenos Aires, Argentina	A Boeing 737-204C overran the runway after the pilots accidentally attempted to take off with the flaps retracted. The plane sped across a highway, striking a car, before smashing into construction equipment and bursting into flames, killing 63 of the 100 people aboard, as well as 2 people on the ground, and injuring 3 on the ground as well.
Cubana de Aviación Flight 1216	1999	La Aurora International Airport, Guatemala City, Guatemala	The McDonnell Douglas DC-10 overran the runway, went down a slope, and crashed into ten houses of a neighborhood, killing 8 passengers and 8 crew members as well as 2 people on the ground.
Southwest Airlines Flight 1455	2000	Bob Hope Airport, Burbank, California, U.S.	A Boeing 737-300 landed too fast to stop on a wet runway, crashed through a perimeter wall and came to a stop near a gas station. Everyone survived, but due to structural damage the aircraft was written off.
TAME Flight 120	2003	Mariscal Sucre Airport, Quito, Ecuador	The flight to Cali, Colombia aborted takeoff due to a tire blowout. The nose gear collapsed, and the aircraft came to rest 81 metres (266 ft) past the runway threshold and into the runway safety area. There were no injuries, but the aircraft was written off.
Lion Air Flight 538	2004	Adisumarmo International Airport, Surakarta, Indonesia	While landing in wet weather, the McDonnell Douglas MD-82 overran the runway due to hydroplaning and poor aircraft braking performance. After leaving the runway, the aircraft struck an embankment and split into two sections. 25 of the 153 people on board were killed.
Southwest Airlines Flight 1248	2005	Midway International Airport, Chicago, Illinois, U.S.	A Boeing 737-700 overran the runway while landing in a snowstorm and crashed into automobile traffic, killing one person on the ground.
Air France Flight 358	2005	Toronto Pearson International Airport, Toronto, Canada	An Airbus A340 overran the end of the runway and came to rest in a ravine. 43 people were injured, and the aircraft was destroyed by a post-crash fire.
S7 Airlines Flight 778	2006	Irkutsk International Airport, Irkutsk, Russia	The Airbus A310 overshot the runway and struck a concrete barrier at high speed, causing the aircraft to break apart and igniting a massive fire. 125 of the 203 occupants were killed.
Comair Flight 5191	2006	Blue Grass Airport, Lexington, Kentucky, U.S.	The Bombardier CRJ100 overshot the runway and struck a low earthen wall adjacent to a ditch, briefly leaving the ground, clipped airport perimeter fencing with its landing gear and smashed into trees, separating the fuselage and flight deck from the tail. 49 of the 50 occupants were killed.
Garuda Indonesia Flight 200	2007	Adisutjipto International Airport, Yogyakarta, Indonesia	During landing, the Boeing 737-400 departed the runway, crashed into a rice field and burst into flames. Of the 140 occupants, 21 were killed.
TAM Airlines Flight 3054	2007	São Paulo–Congonhas Airport, São Paulo, Brazil	An Airbus A320 overran the runway while landing in rain, and crashed into a warehouse. All 187 people on board, and 12 people on the ground, were killed.
Iberia Flight 6463	2007	Mariscal Sucre International Airport, Quito, Ecuador	The Airbus A340-600 was badly damaged and eventually written off after sliding off runway 35 and coming to a stop in the runway safety area. The landing gear collapsed and two engines were dislodged. All 333 passengers and crew were evacuated via inflatable slides, but no serious injuries were reported.
Sriwijaya Air Flight 62	2008	Sultan Thaha Airport, Jambi, Indonesia	The Boeing 737-200 overran the runway due to a hydraulics malfunction and crashed into a house. There were no fatalities out of the 130 passengers and crew on board the aircraft, but one person inside the house was killed. The aircraft received substantial damage and was written off.
Sudan Airways Flight 109	2008	Khartoum International Airport, Khartoum, Sudan	An Airbus A310-300 overran the runway and came to rest beyond the end of runway 36. A fire then erupted on the starboard side of the aircraft, communications between crew members were ineffective and hand luggage caused further delay in the evacuation process during evacuation of the aircraft. 30 out of 214 died as a result.
Icaro Air Flight 504	2008	Mariscal Sucre International Airport, Quito, Ecuador	A Fokker F28-4000 on a flight to El Coca's Francisco de Orellana Airport, aborted takeoff due to an alarm fire in the front cargo compartment. The plane could not stop in time, hit the ILS antenna at the north end of the runway, went off the runway safety area and hit a brick wall before stopping. There were no fatalities among the 62 passengers and 4 crew members, but the airframe was written off.
American Airlines Flight 331	2009	Norman Manley International Airport, Kingston, Jamaica	A Boeing 737-800 landing in rain and a tailwind touched down more than 4,000 feet (1,200 m) from the start of the runway. Unable to stop in the remaining distance, it broke apart on rocks near the shoreline. No one was killed, but 85 people were injured and the plane was destroyed.
Air India Express Flight 812	2010	Mangalore International Airport, Mangalore, India	The Boeing 737-800 overshot the end of the runway, went through a 300-foot (90 m) sand arrestor bed meant as excursion protection, then slid down a steep hillside. 158 of the 166 occupants were killed.
Caribbean Airlines Flight 523	2011	Cheddi Jagan International Airport, Georgetown, Guyana	A Boeing 737-800 overran the runway while attempting to land in rainy weather. All occupants survived, but the aircraft was irreparably damaged and seven people were injured.
Red Wings Airlines Flight 9268	2012	Vnukovo International Airport, Moscow, Russia	A Tupolev TU-204-100 overran the runway while landing due to a braking system failure and pilot error running into a ditch and highway structures. The aircraft was destroyed, and five out of the eight aboard were killed. This accident was the first fatal accident of the TU-204 since its introduction in 1989.
Congo A310 crash	2015	Mbuji-Mayi Airport, Mbuji-Mayi, DRC	The A310 operating a cargo flight for the Congolese company Services Air overran the runway at Mbuji-Mayi Airport. None of the five people on board were killed or injured but eight people were killed on the ground.
Ameristar Charters Flight 9363	2017	Willow Run Airport, Ypsilanti, Michigan, U.S.	The McDonnell Douglas MD-83 operating Flight 9363 suffered a runway excursion at Willow Run Airport, Michigan. All 110 passengers and 6 crew members survived, but one was injured. The aircraft was subsequently written off.
Pegasus Airlines Flight 8622	2018	Trabzon Airport, Trabzon, Turkey	A Boeing 737-800 ran off the left side of the runway during landing and slid down a cliff, stopping short of the water. No one was killed, but the aircraft was destroyed.
Sky Lease Cargo Flight 4854	2018	Halifax Stanfield International Airport, Nova Scotia, Canada	A Boeing 747-400F overran Runway 14 while attempting a landing. Three crew members were injured, and the aircraft was damaged beyond repair.
US-Bangla Airlines Flight 211	2018	Tribhuvan International Airport, Kathmandu, Nepal	A Bombardier Q400 skidded off the runway while landing, crashed through the inner perimeter fence on the edge of the airport, and slid down the slope. The aircraft disintegrated into pieces as it slid down the rough slope before crashing into the football field and bursting into flames. 51 out of 71 occupants were killed
Saha Airlines crash	2019	Fath Air Base, Karaj, Alborz Province, Iran	The last Boeing 707 in commercial use overran the runway after the flight crew mistook the Fath Air Base runway for the much longer one at Payam International Airport. 15 of the 16 people on board were killed.
Miami Air International Flight 293	2019	Naval Air Station Jacksonville, Florida, U.S.	The Boeing 737-800 of Miami Air International transporting military personnel and civilians from Leeward Airfield in Guantanamo Bay suffered a runway excursion at Naval Air Station Jacksonville while attempting to land in a thunderstorm, causing 21 injuries among the 143 aboard.
PenAir Flight 3296	2019	Unalaska Airport, Alaska, U.S.	A Saab 2000 of PenAir operating as Alaska Airlines Flight 3296 suffered a runway excursion at Unalaska Airport after it landed at its destination airport. Of the 42 occupants, 1 passenger died and 11 more suffered injuries. The aircraft was subsequently written off.
Pegasus Airlines Flight 2193	2020	Sabiha Gökçen International Airport, Istanbul, Turkey	A Boeing 737-800 overran the runway while landing in heavy rain and high winds and broke into several pieces, killing 3 of the 183 people aboard.
Air India Express Flight 1344	2020	Calicut International Airport, Kerala, India	A Boeing 737-800 overran the tabletop runway, skidding off the end of the runway and crashing into a gorge. The aircraft was carrying 190 people including 6 crew members. A total of 21 people, including both pilots, were killed in the crash.
Korean Air Flight 631	2022	Mactan–Cebu International Airport, Lapu-Lapu City, Cebu, Philippines	An Airbus A330-322 overran the runway while landing because of a hydraulic failure. All 173 passengers and crew members survived without injuries, however the aircraft was damaged beyond repair and written off.
P-8 Poseidon runway overrun	2023	Marine Corps Air Station Kaneohe Bay, Hawaii, U.S.	A Boeing P-8A Poseidon overran the runway and subsequently ditched in Kāneʻohe Bay while landing. All nine crew on board survived and the accident is currently under investigation.
Air Serbia Flight 324	2024	Belgrade Nikola Tesla Airport, Belgrade, Serbia	An Embraer 195 overran on takeoff and struck runway lights before becoming airborne. All 111 passengers and crew members survived without injuries. The aircraft was damaged beyond repair and written off and was to be dismantled.
Jeju Air Flight 2216	2024	Muan International Airport, South Jeolla, South Korea	A Boeing 737-8AS suffered a runway excursion after attempting a belly landing, and then crashed into a concrete barrier. Of the 181 occupants onboard, 179 were killed.
Emirates SkyCargo Flight 9788	2025	Hong Kong International Airport, Hong Kong, China	A Boeing 747-481BDSF veered off the runway, struck a ground vehicle and smashed through the airport perimeter fence. Two people in the vehicle were killed, while all 4 occupants of the 747 survived.
2026 Bolivian Air Force Lockheed C-130 crash	2026	El Alto International Airport, El Alto, Bolivia	A Bolivian Air Force Lockheed C-130 Hercules on a domestic flight from Viru Viru International Airport, Santa Cruz de la Sierra, to El Alto International Airport, La Paz, suffered a runway excursion after landing and crashed onto a busy road, impacting 15 vehicles, killing at least 24 people, and injuring more than 43 others.
21 Air Flight 7598	2026	Miami International Airport, Miami, Florida	A Boeing 767-33AER (BDSF) overran the runway and crossed a roadway, struck several cars and came to a halt on fire on another roadway. 5 people on ground died and more were injured while both pilots survived with serious injuries.
