= Talpa =

Talpa may refer to:

== Places ==
- Talpa, Iran, a village in Khuzestan Province, Iran
- Talpa, Teleorman, a commune in Teleorman County, Romania
- Talpa, a village in Cândeşti Commune, Botoşani County, Romania
- Talpa, a village in Bârgăuani Commune, Neamţ County, Romania
- Talpa, New Mexico, a village in Taos County
- Talpa, Texas, a village in Texas
- Talpa de Allende, a city in Jalisco, Mexico

== Other uses ==
- Talpa Network, a Dutch media company
- Talpa Media, a Dutch television production company
- Tien (TV channel), a former television channel in the Netherlands also known as Talpa
- Talpa (mammal), a genus of moles
- Talpa (Ronin Warriors), a character from the anime Ronin Warriors
- Talpa (film), a 1956 Mexican film
- Takeoff and Landing Performance Assessment (TALPA), a method used by airport operators to determine runway conditions for take-off and landing
