= Cherop =

Cherop or Jerop is a name of Kenyan origin meaning born during the rain. Notable people with the surname include:

- Peninah Arusei Jerop (born 1979), Kenyan half marathon runner
- Sharon Cherop (born 1984), Kenyan marathon runner

== See also ==
- Rop (name)
- Kiprop
