= Flight 759 =

Flight 759 may refer to:

- Pan Am Flight 759, crashed on 9 July 1982
- Air Canada Flight 759, narrowly avoided a crash on 7 July 2017
