= Lufthansa Flight 2904 =

1993 passenger plane crash in Warsaw, Poland

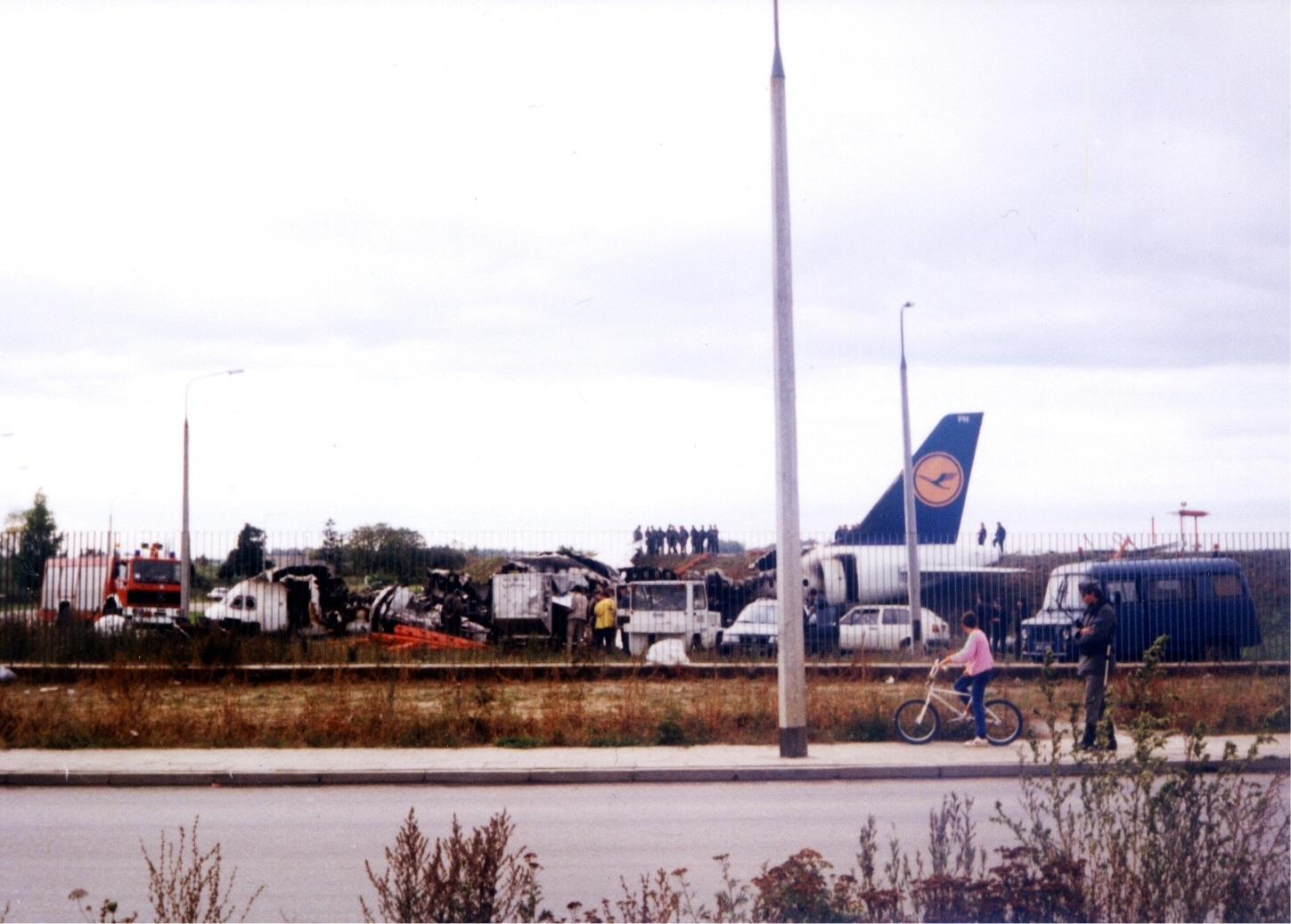
- Wreckage of Flight 2904 on 15 September 1993

Accident
- Date: 14 September 1993
- Summary: Overshot runway due to pilot error
- Site: Warsaw Chopin Airport, Warsaw, Poland; 52°09′39″N 20°59′07″E

Aircraft
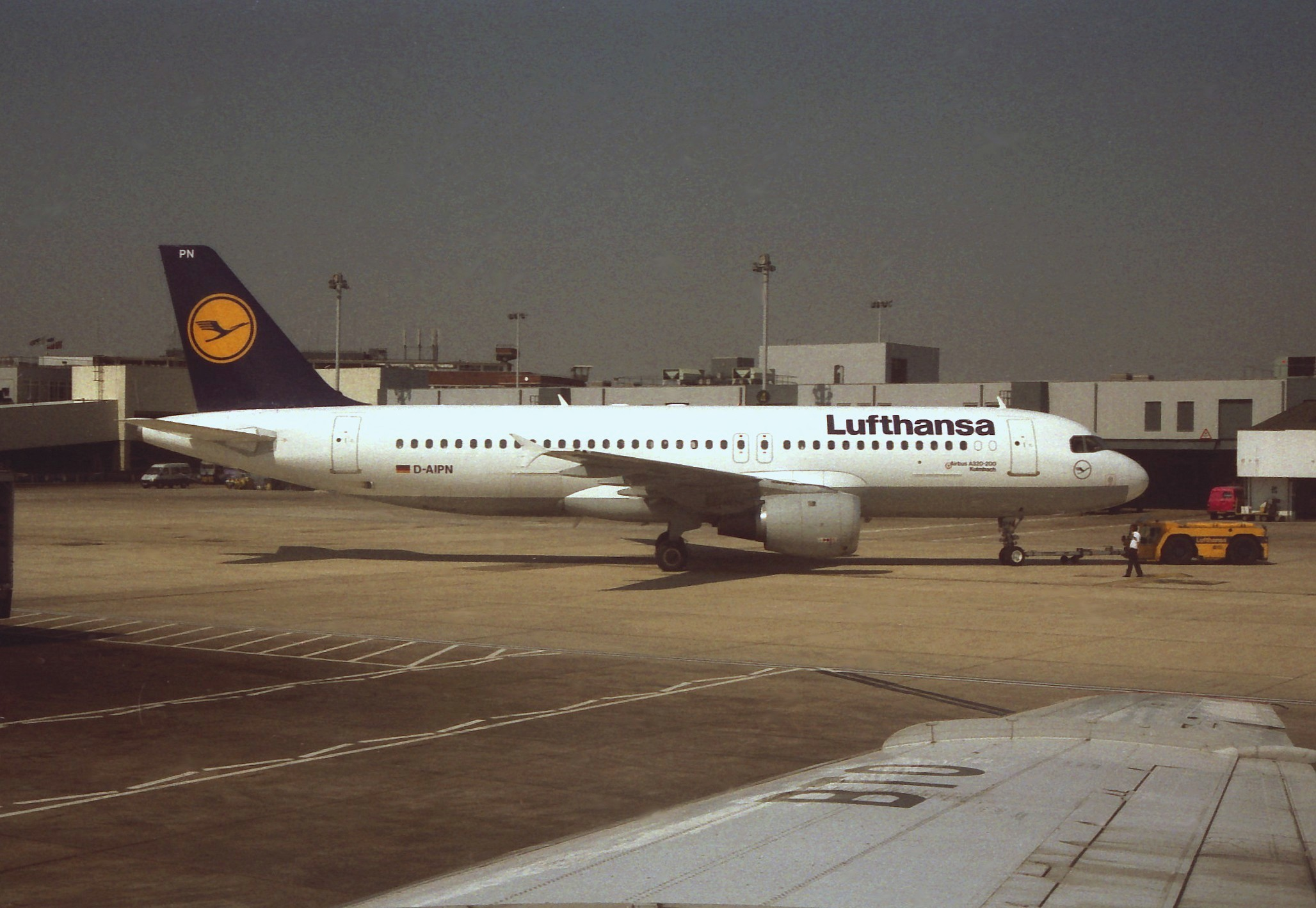
- D-AIPN, the aircraft involved in the accident, pictured at London Heathrow Airport in 1991
- Aircraft type: Airbus A320-211
- Aircraft name: Kulmbach
- Operator: Lufthansa
- IATA flight No.: LH2904
- ICAO flight No.: DLH2904
- Call sign: LUFTHANSA 2904
- Registration: D-AIPN
- Flight origin: Frankfurt Airport, Frankfurt, Germany
- Destination: Warsaw Chopin Airport, Warsaw, Poland
- Occupants: 70
- Passengers: 64
- Crew: 6
- Fatalities: 2
- Injuries: 56
- Survivors: 68

Lufthansa Flight 2904 was an Airbus A320 flying from Frankfurt, Germany to Warsaw, Poland that overran the runway at Okęcie International Airport on 14 September 1993.

== Incident description ==
Illustration of time elapsed between touchdown of the first main strut, the second and engagement of brakes.

Lufthansa Flight 2904 was cleared to land at Okęcie International Airport Runway 11 and was informed of the existence of wind shear on the approach. To compensate for the crosswind, the pilots attempted to touch down with the aircraft banked slightly to the right and with a speed of about 20 knots (37 km/h; 23 mph) faster than usual. According to the manual, this was the correct procedure for the reported weather conditions, but the weather report was not up-to-date. At the moment of touchdown, the assumed crosswind turned out to be a tailwind of approximately 20 knots (37 km/h; 23 mph). With the resulting increased speed, the airplane hit the ground at approximately 170 knots (310 km/h; 200 mph) and far beyond the normal touchdown point; its right gear touched down 770 metres (2,530 ft) from the runway threshold. The left gear touched down nine seconds later, 1,525 metres (5,003 ft) from the threshold. Only when the left gear touched the runway did the ground spoilers and engine thrust reversers start to deploy, these systems depend on oleo strut (shock absorber) compression. The wheel brakes, triggered by wheel rotation being equal to or greater than 72 knots (133 km/h; 83 mph), began to operate about four seconds later.

The remaining length of the runway (left from the moment when braking systems had begun to work) was too short to enable the aircraft to stop. Seeing the approaching end of the runway and the obstacle behind it, the pilot steered the aircraft off the runway to the right. The aircraft departed the runway at a speed of 72 knots (133 km/h; 83 mph) and rolled 90 metres (300 ft) before it hit the embankment and an localizer with the left wing. A fire started in the left wing area and penetrated into the passenger cabin. Two of 70 occupants died, the training captain (seated in the right seat) who died on impact and one passenger who was unable to escape because he lost consciousness from the smoke in the cabin.

== Causes of the accident ==
The main cause of the accident was the incorrect decisions and actions of the flight crew. Some of these decisions were made based on wind shear information that was received by the crew. The wind shear was produced by the front passing over the airport, accompanied by an intensive variation of wind parameters, as well as heavy rain on the runway itself.

Contributing to the cause was the lack of current wind information at the tower. For that reason, no up-to-date wind information could be transmitted to the crew.

Additional causes involved certain design features of the aircraft. Computer logic prevented the activation of both ground spoilers and thrust reversers until a minimum compression load of at least 6.3 tons was sensed on each main landing gear strut, thus preventing the crew from achieving any braking action by the two systems before this condition was met.

=== Aircraft systems ===
To ensure that the thrust-reverse system and the spoilers are only activated in a landing situation, the software has to be sure the aeroplane is on the ground even if the systems are selected mid-air. The spoilers are only activated if there is at least 6.3 tons on each main landing gear strut or if the wheels of the plane are turning faster than 72 knots (133 km/h; 83 mph).

The thrust reversers are only activated if the first condition is true. There is no way for the pilots to override the software decision and activate either system manually.

In the case of the Warsaw accident, neither condition was fulfilled, so the most effective braking system was not activated. Because the plane landed inclined (to counteract the anticipated crosswind), the required pressure of 12 combined tons on both landing gears necessary to trigger the sensor was not reached. The plane's wheels did not reach the minimum rotation speed because of a hydroplaning effect on the wet runway.

Only when the left landing gear touched the runway did the automatic aircraft systems allow the ground spoilers and engine thrust reversers to operate. Because of the braking distances in the heavy rain, the aircraft could not stop before the end of the runway. The computer did not actually recognize that the aircraft had landed until it was already 125 meters beyond the halfway point of Runway 11.

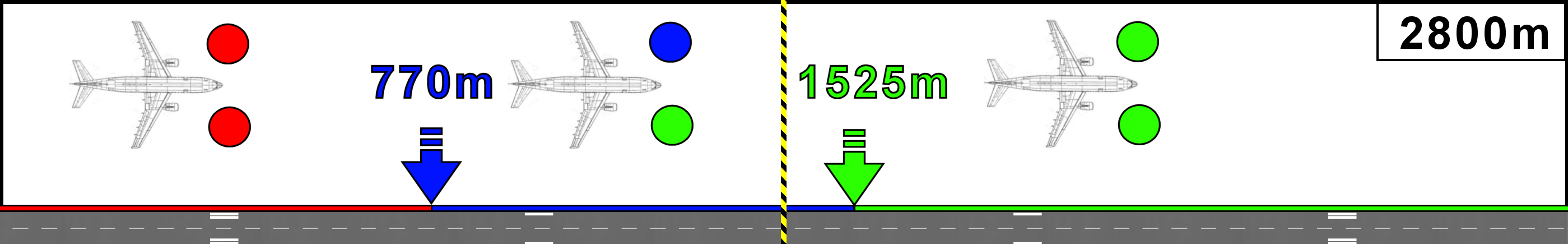
Illustration of distance relative to main strut touchdown. The striped line marks 1400 m, which divides the runway in half. Red indicates that the landing gear have not touched down, blue indicates hydroplaning and green indicates wheels on the ground.

== Passengers and crew ==
As a result of the impact, a fire broke out and penetrated into the cabin, killing one of the passengers. The training captain in the co-pilot's seat was also killed in the crash. A total of 51 people were seriously injured (including two crew members), and five were slightly injured.

== See also ==
- Philippine Airlines Flight 137, an Airbus A320 (RP-C3222) that overran the runway and crashed into a residential area in 1998 at Bacolod City Domestic Airport.
- American Airlines Flight 1420, a McDonnell Douglas MD-80 (N215AA) that overran the runway and crashed in 1999 at Little Rock National Airport.
- Air France Flight 358, an Airbus A340 (F-GLZQ) that overran the runway and crashed in 2005 at Toronto Pearson International Airport.
- TAM Airlines Flight 3054, an Airbus A320 (PR-MBK) that overran the runway and crashed into a gas station in 2007 at São Paulo–Congonhas Airport.
- Korean Air Flight 631, an Airbus A330 (HL7525) that overran the runway and crashed in 2022 at Mactan–Cebu International Airport.
