= ROP =

ROP or RoP may refer to:

== Science and technology ==
- Retinopathy of prematurity, a condition of the eyes causing blindness
- Right occiput posterior, in obstetrics
- Ring-opening polymerization, a type of polymerization
- Rop protein, a helical protein found in E. coli
- Raster Operations Pipeline, graphics processing component
- Raster Operator in a bit blit operation
- Return-oriented programming, an exploit technique
- Role-oriented programming, a programming paradigm

== Places ==
- Rop rock shelter, an archeological site in Nigeria
- Rota International Airport, Northern Mariana Islands, US Commonwealth, IATA code
- Sovereign states with the abbreviation:
  - Palau (Republic of Palau)
  - Panama (Republic of Panama)
  - Paraguay (Republic of Paraguay)
  - Peru (Republic of Peru)
  - Philippines (Republic of the Philippines)
  - Poland (Republic of Poland)

== Other uses ==
- The Review of Politics, an academic journal
- Rate of penetration, in drilling for oil
- Regional Occupational Program
- Reorder point, a term used in supply chain management
- The Lord of the Rings: The Rings of Power, a fantasy TV series based on the works of J. R. R. Tolkien
- Rop (name), name of Kenyan origin
- Royal Oman Police, Sultanate of Oman
- Ruch Odbudowy Polski, the Movement for Reconstruction of Poland, a Polish political party

== See also ==
- Rops (disambiguation)
