= Continental Airlines Flight 12 =

1965 aviation accident

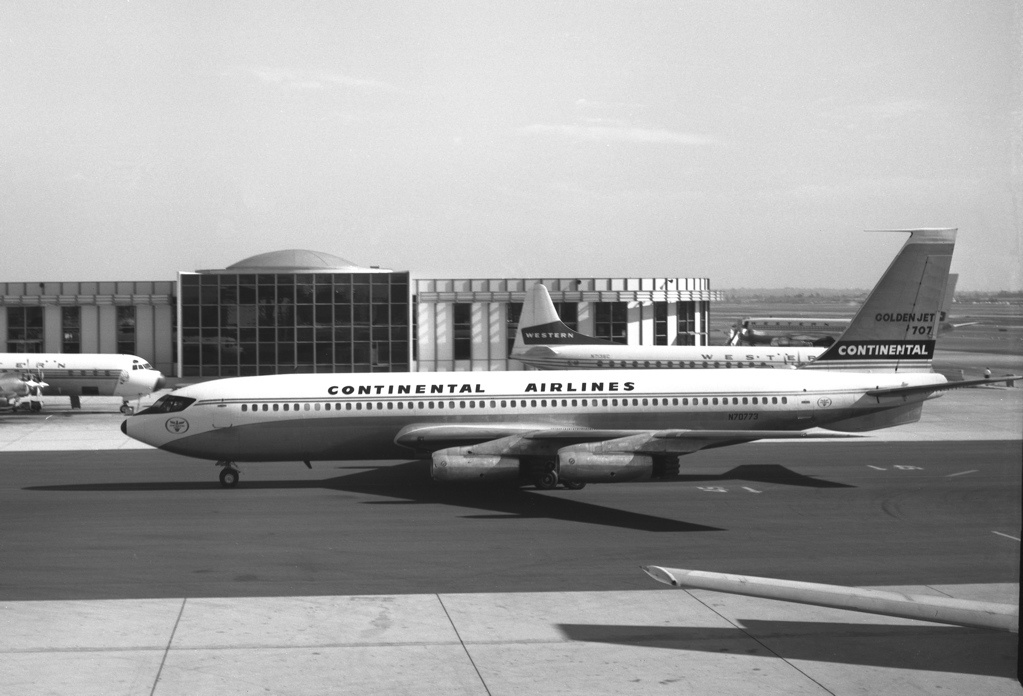
- The aircraft involved in the incident

Accident
- Date: July 1, 1965
- Summary: Runway overrun
- Site: Kansas City Municipal Airport, Kansas City, Missouri; 39°06′51″N 94°35′44″W

Aircraft
- Aircraft type: Boeing 707-124
- Operator: Continental Airlines
- IATA flight No.: CO12
- ICAO flight No.: COA12
- Call sign: CONTINENTAL 12
- Registration: N70773
- Flight origin: Los Angeles International Airport, California, United States
- Stopover: Kansas City Municipal Airport, Kansas City, Missouri, United States
- Destination: Chicago O'Hare International Airport
- Occupants: 66
- Passengers: 60
- Crew: 6
- Fatalities: 0
- Injuries: 5
- Survivors: 66

On July 1, 1965, Continental Airlines Flight 12, a Boeing 707, overran the runway while attempting to land at Kansas City Municipal Airport. No one was killed or seriously injured, but the accident forced discussions about runway safety in Kansas City and resulted in the construction of a new airport, Kansas City International Airport, which opened in 1972. The accident also led to widespread implementation of runway grooving, which improves braking in wet landing conditions.

== Background ==
Continental Airlines Flight 12 was a scheduled domestic passenger flight from Los Angeles International Airport to Chicago O'Hare International Airport, with an intermediate stop in Kansas City. On July 1, 1965, operated Flight 12 using a Boeing 707 four-engine narrow-body airliner (registration (N70773). The flight crew consisted of captain Lee R. Zerba (44), first officer Howard T. Anderson (35), and flight engineer Harold E. Cameron (38).

== Accident ==
After a routine flight, the plane was making an approach on the instrument landing system for Runway 18. There was heavy rain and low visibility at the airport. The wind was reported from the East-northeast at 7 knots. At most airports, this would normally mean an approach should be initiated from the other direction, Runway 36. Quality Hill, in downtown Kansas City overlooks the airport from this direction. It is so close to the end of the runway that aircraft have to go around it to land safely in good weather. This obstacle prevented the installation of an instrument landing system on this runway. It is normally considered safe to land opposite direction in these conditions but they would be landing with a slight tailwind.

Flight 12 landed in heavy rain at 5:29 a.m. Central Standard Time, about 1,050 feet (320 m) past the start of Runway 18. Spoilers, thrust reversers and braking were initiated, but did not slow the airplane as anticipated. Realizing the aircraft could not stop before the end of the runway, the captain deliberately tried to swing the aircraft to the left so the right wing would take the initial brunt of impact. Using left rudder and adding power to the Nos. 3 and 4 (right-side) engines, the aircraft pivoted 35 degrees to the left but continued to slide down the runway, still traveling at 40 knots (74 km/h) when it went off the concrete. The right wing impacted a blast mound as the aircraft rolled over it, coming to rest in three pieces on the perimeter road between the mound and river levee. The aircraft was damaged beyond repair and written off, making the accident the 14th hull loss of a Boeing 707. Five people (including three passengers and two crew members) received minor injuries.

== Investigation ==
The Civil Aeronautics Board (CAB) investigated the accident.

The CAB also determined that Flight 12 had not been given adequate weather information from the Kansas City approach controller or from company personnel that they could use to determine whether a safe landing was possible. As a result, the flight crew had no reason to expect difficulty during landing. The CAB also determined that the point Flight 12 had touched down (1,050 feet (320 m) beyond the start of the runway) was within the designated ILS touchdown area.

Having determined that the aircraft first touched down 1,050 feet (320 m) down the 7,000 feet (2,100 m) runway, the CAB investigated whether it was possible for Flight 12 to stop in the remaining (5,950 feet (1,810 m). The CAB found evidence to believe that hydroplaning had occurred due to water accumulation on the runway. Based on information from Boeing on the 707's braking performance, input from a NASA technical expert, and witness interviews, the CAB determined that under the landing conditions at the time, it was not possible for Flight 12 to come to a stop in the remaining distance.

In June 1966, the CAB released their final report, concluding that "the probable cause of this accident was hydroplaning of the landing gear wheels which precluded braking effectiveness."

== Aftermath ==
Although there were no fatalities in the accident, it highlighted a number of shortcomings with jet aircraft operations at Kansas City Municipal Airport. At 7,000 feet (2,100 m), runway 18-36 was barely long enough for Boeing 707 aircraft. The airport could not be expanded, as it was surrounded on three sides by the Missouri River and a rail yard on the east side. Pilots demanded action in Kansas City after the Flight 12 accident.

Runway grooving was a brand new development at the time Flight 12 occurred. Kansas City airport officials grooved the airport, which greatly improved braking conditions afterward. The Federal Aviation Administration implemented a program to institute runway grooving more broadly, and by 1969 the FAA had implemented grooving at four airports: Atlanta Municipal Airport, Chicago Midway Airport, John F. Kennedy Airport, and Washington National Airport. However, commercial pilots continued to consider the airport unsafe even after it was grooved. In September 1969, the Airline Pilots Association (ALPA) released a member survey which named Kansas City Municipal Airport as one of the 10 most dangerous airports in America. Runway conditions at the airport, and the Flight 12 accident, were given by ALPA as specific reasons for including Kansas City on their 10 worst list.

A new airport, Kansas City International Airport, was built to provide commercial air service to Kansas City. The new airport would have two runways, one 9,500 feet (2,900 m) and the other 9,000 feet (2,700 m), offering a greater safety margin for commercial jet aircraft such as the Boeing 707. In 1972 commercial airline operations were moved to the new airport.

Continental continued to use the "Flight 12" designation on its Honolulu to Los Angeles routing. After its acquisition by United Airlines, the flight number was kept for its LAX-HNL routing but it is now used on an IAH-LGA routing.

== Similar accidents ==
- TAM Airlines Flight 3054
- Southwest Airlines Flight 1455
- Air France Flight 358
- Southwest Airlines Flight 1248
- DHL Aero Expreso Flight 7216

== Notes ==
As of 2007, former runways 18 and 36 are known as runways 1 and 19. Kansas City did not observe Daylight saving time until 1967.
