= Rops =

Rops may refer to:

== People ==
- Daniel-Rops (1901–1965), French writer and historian
- Félicien Rops (1833–1898), Belgian artist

== Places ==
- Rops (peak), a mountain in Kosovo

== Sports ==
- Rovaniemen Palloseura (RoPS), a Finnish football club

== Technology ==
- Rollover protection structure, a system or structure intended to protect equipment operators and motorists from injuries caused by vehicle overturns or rollovers
- Runway Overrun Prevention System, a technology used in the Airbus A350 XWB
- Render output unit (or raster operations pipeline, ROP), a feature of graphics cards

== See also ==
- ROP (disambiguation)
- Rop (name)
