= Chanchangi Airlines =

Nigerian airline

Chanchangi

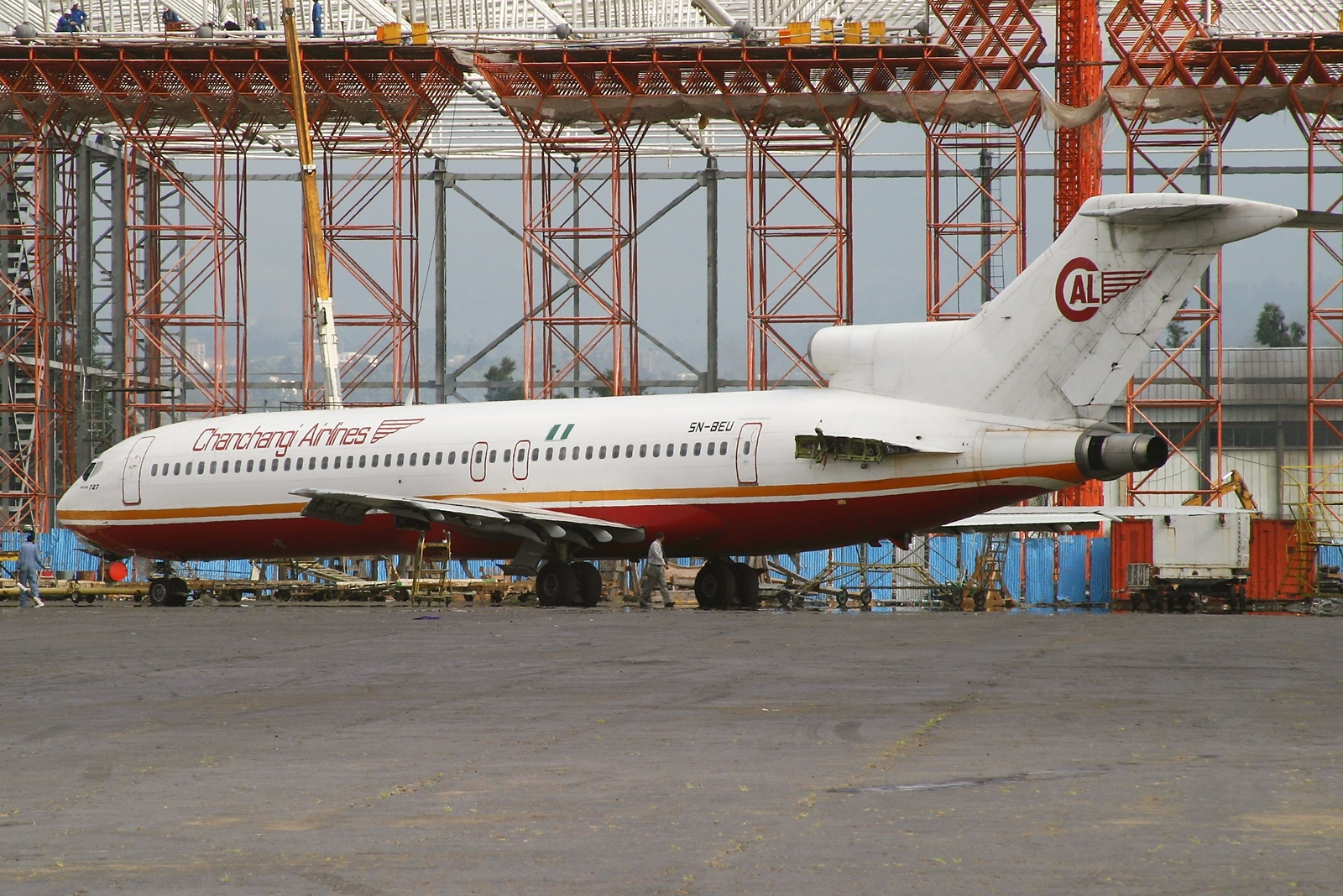
IATA	ICAO	Call sign
5B	NCH	CHANCHANGI
- Founded: 1994
- Ceased operations: 2012
- Hubs: Murtala Mohammed Airport
- Frequent-flyer program: SRT
- Fleet size: 2
- Destinations: 0
- Parent company: Chanchangi Airlines (Nigeria) Limited
- Headquarters: Kaduna, Nigeria
- Key people: Alhaji Ahmadu Chanchangi (Chairman), Trevor Worthington (Managing Director)
- Website: www.flychanchangair.com

Chanchangi Airlines Nigeria Limited was a privately owned and operated airline with its head office in the Chanchangi Office Complex in Kaduna, Nigeria. It operates scheduled domestic passenger services. Its main base was Murtala Mohammed International Airport, Lagos, with hubs at Kaduna, Abuja, and Port Harcourt. Alhaji Ahmadu Chanchangi, its founder, hails from Chanchangi village in Takum Local Government of Taraba state, Nigeria.

== History ==
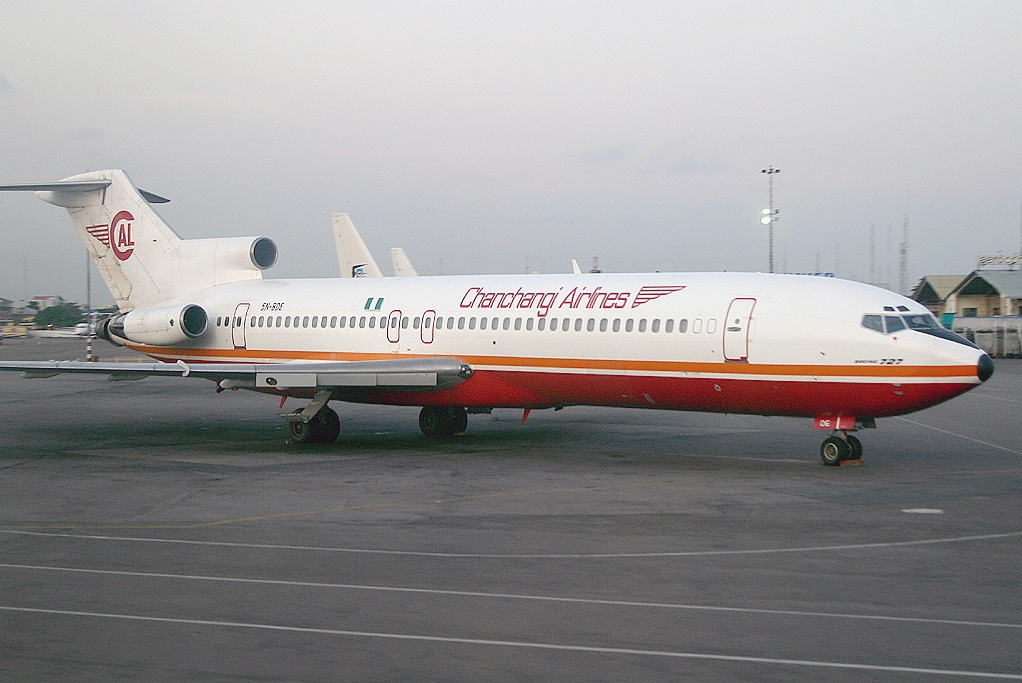
A Chanchangi Airlines Boeing 727-200 Advanced at Murtala Muhammed International Airport in 2005.

The airline was established on 5 January 1994 by Alhaji Chanchangi and started flight operations to and from Kaduna, Lagos, Owerri, Abuja and Port Harcourt on 2 May 1997. Services were operated using Boeing 727-200 aircraft; 3 Boeing 737-200 aircraft and 2 Boeing 737-300 aircraft were also acquired in 2009. Chanchangi Airlines won the Federal Airports Authority of Nigeria (FAAN) and the Corporate Merit Award for “Best Domestic Airline of the Year” for 1998, 1999 and 2000.

In 2004, it obtained route authorities for services to Abidjan, Accra, Dakar, Douala and Malabo. On 26 March 2006 services from Lagos to Accra were introduced. The airline was owned by Alhaji Ahmadu Chanchangi (94%) and four other individuals holding a 1% stake each. It had 780 employees by March 2007.

The Nigerian government set a deadline of April 30, 2007, for all airlines operating in the country to re-capitalise or be grounded, in an effort to ensure better services and safety. The airline satisfied the Nigerian Civil Aviation Authority (NCAA)’s criteria in terms of re-capitalization and was re-registered for operation.

The Nigerian Civil Aviation Authority (NCAA) grounded Chanchangi Airlines on July 5, 2010, citing a regulation that no airline can operate with only one aircraft in service, which was the case with Chanchangi at the time. On October 21, 2010, Chanchangi Airlines resumed operations between Lagos and Abuja.

Chanchangi Airlines failed to appear on April 1, 2012, to defend itself against charges filed against it by Ethiopian Airlines for failing to settle a 14 million Br bill for maintenance services. Due to this, its plane was grounded at Bole International Airport, where some analysts predicted failure to make payment would lead Ethiopian Airlines to auction the aircraft.

== Destinations ==
Chanchangi Airlines suspended all flights in 2012.

== Charter flights ==
Chanchangi Airlines has conducted charter flight both within and outside Nigeria. Some of its charter partners were:

- The United Nations
- The Nigerian Army
- Armed Forces Command & Staff College, Jaji
- Nigeria football academy ...................................................
- Getra in Equatorial Guinea

== Incidents ==
- One of Chanchangi Airlines Boeing 727s crash landed (with a landing gear problem) at the Murtala Mohammed International Airport, Lagos on 29 December 2004 after a flight from Port Harcourt. The 81 people on board were uninjured and there was no major damage to the plane. As a result, the remaining 5 Boeing 727s were grounded to enable investigators to carry out in depth inspections on the aircraft. On 3 January 2005 the Nigerian Civil Aviation Authority (NCAA) permitted the resumption of full flight operations.
- Following the crash of Sosoliso Airlines flight 1145 on December 10, 2005, President Olusegun Obasanjo grounded both Sosoliso and Chanchangi Airlines. Chanchangi's grounding was based on a report that its operations were unsafe. After passing inspections by Nigeria's aviation ministry, Chanchangi was allowed to resume operations on December 22, 2005.
- A Boeing 727 en route to Abuja was forced to return to Lagos on May 9 after the crew reported a problem with the aircraft's air conditioning system.
- On August 22, 2006, two tyres burst on a Boeing 727 with 98 passengers on board. The pilot reportedly made a hard landing to grip with the wet runway after a heavy rain at Nnamdi Azikiwe International Airport in Abuja. There were no casualties.
- Chanchangi suffered multiple safety incidents and near-accidents in mid/late 2007. A Kaduna-Lagos flight was aborted after an engine blade broke off about twenty minutes into the flight. In mid September, a Lagos-Abuja flight returned to Lagos after hydraulic leakages were discovered.
- On February 22, 1998, Chanchangi Airlines' chief pilot asked Air Traffic Control (ATC) at Kaduna, Nigeria for permission to conduct flight training within the airport's circuit using a Chanchangi Airlines Boeing 737-2K3 (leased from Aviogenex, registered YU-ANU) which had arrived from Lagos approximately one hour earlier. As visibility had reduced to 600 meters, he was told it was below the minimum allowed for landing and his request was not feasible. Next, the pilot requested he be allowed to conduct rejected take-off training, and permission was subsequently granted by ATC. Several individuals joined the captain for the exercise. He was instructed to begin the training on Runway 05, and once in position permission for "takeoff" was given. Normally, any single rejected takeoff at high speed would require a minimum of ten minutes to allow the brakes to cool before the aircraft could be safely operated again, and depending on various factors, this time period could be much longer, something the pilot certainly would have known. However, within the next twelve minutes, the pilot inexplicably conducted no less than four rejected take-offs, at least one of them and possibly all four of them at high speed. The brakes on one of the main landing gears (left side) began to catch fire, exacerbated by leaking hydraulic fluid. The pilot continued to taxi the aircraft until the tires and then the wheels of the left main gear disintegrated, preventing the plane from moving any further. He then called for emergency services. Unfortunately, they were unable to prevent the aircraft from burning to the ground. There were no fatalities. The chief pilot alleged he did not use the brakes for his practice rejected take-offs, however the evidence was unequivocally otherwise.
- On October 13, 2007, a Boeing 727 making a trip from Kaduna to Abuja en route to Lagos suffered a cockpit fire.
- On 20 August 2010, Chanchangi Flight 334, operated by Boeing 737-200 5N-BIF struck the localiser antenna and landed short of the runway at Kaduna Airport. Several passengers were slightly injured and the aircraft was substantially damaged. Chanchangi Airlines again suspended operations following the accident.

== Fleet ==
The Chanchangi Airlines fleet consisted of the following aircraft at the time of its closure (as of December 2012):

Chanchangi Airlines fleet
Aircraft	In fleet	Order	Passengers
Boeing 737-300	2	0	118

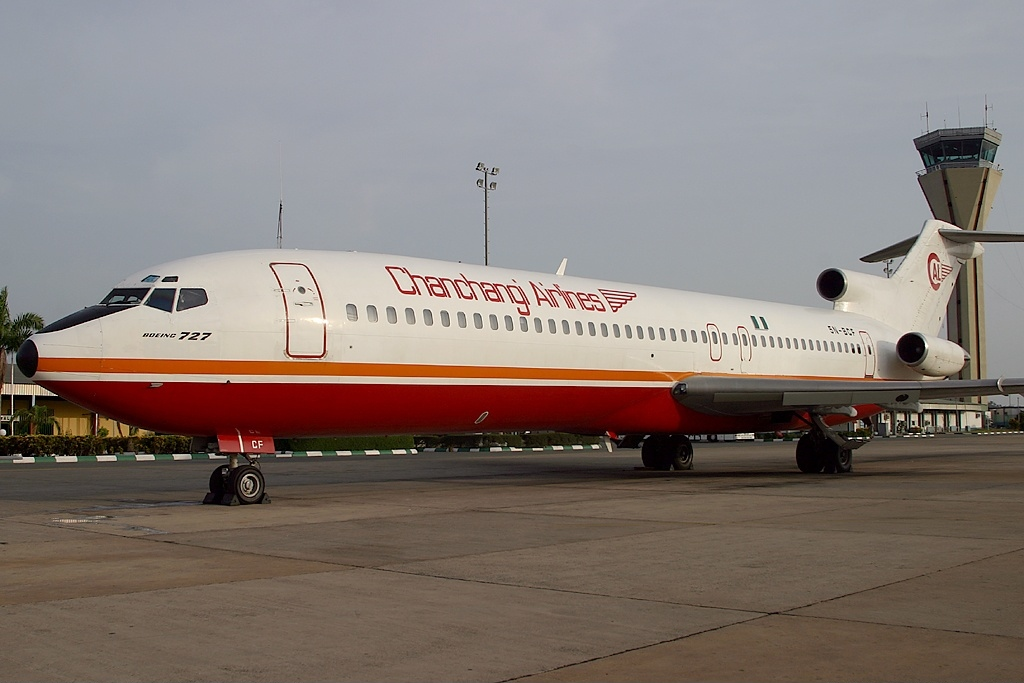
chanchangi Airline
