= Nigeria Airways Flight 357 =

1995 aviation accident

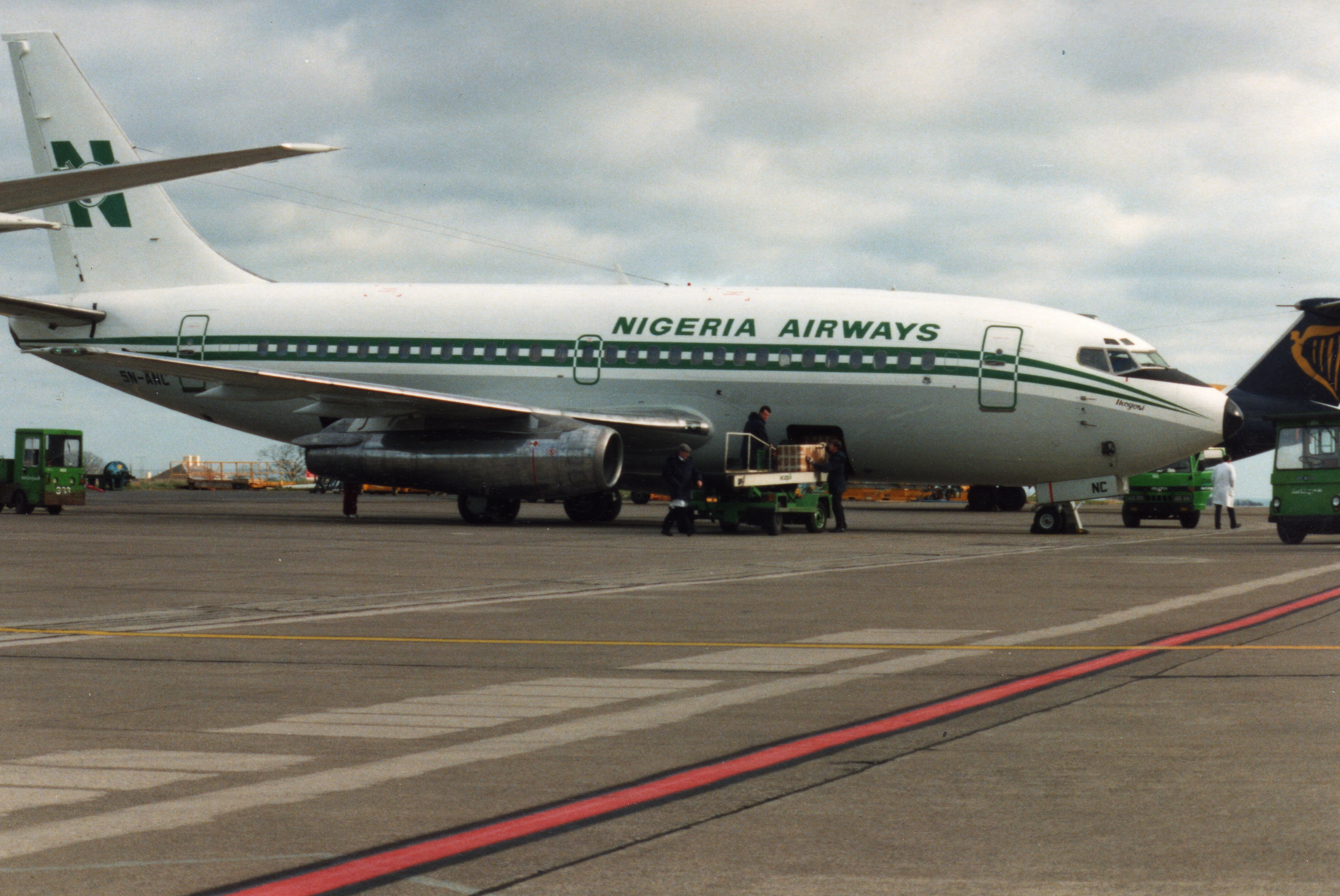
- A Boeing 737 sister ship to the accident aircraft

Accident
- Date: 13 November 1995
- Summary: Runway overrun due to pilot error
- Site: Kaduna International Airport, Kaduna, Kaduna State, Nigeria; 10°41′42″N 07°19′10″E

Aircraft
- Aircraft type: Boeing 737-2F9
- Operator: Nigeria Airways
- IATA flight No.: WT357
- ICAO flight No.: NGA357
- Call sign: NIGERIAN 357
- Registration: 5N-AUA
- Flight origin: Yola Airport, Yola, Adamawa State, Nigeria
- 1st stopover: Yakubu Gowon Airport, Jos, Plateau State, Nigeria
- Last stopover: Kaduna International Airport, Kaduna, Kaduna State, Nigeria
- Destination: Murtala Muhammed International Airport, Ikeja, Lagos State, Nigeria
- Occupants: 138
- Passengers: 124
- Crew: 14
- Fatalities: 11
- Injuries: 66
- Survivors: 127

Nigeria Airways Flight 357 was a scheduled Nigeria Airways domestic passenger flight from Yola Airport in Yola to Murtala Muhammed International Airport in Lagos, with stops at Yakubu Gowon Airport in Jos and Kaduna International Airport in Kaduna. On 13 November 1995, the Boeing 737-200, during its second leg of the flight from Jos to Kaduna, suffered a runway overrun accident at Kaduna Airport, leading to a fire that destroyed the aircraft. All 14 crew members survived, while 11 of the 124 passengers died.

== Aircraft ==
The aircraft was a Boeing 737-2F9 registered with Nigerian aircraft registration 5N-AUA. The aircraft was equipped with 2 Pratt & Whitney Canada JT8D-15 engines. It was manufactured in 1983, and had airframe time of 22,375.40 hours.

== Accident ==
Flight 357 departed from Yola Airport at 07:30 UTC bound for Kaduna, carrying 138 people. The captain stated that the official crew complement consisted of eight people; the six additional people on board had been accepted at his discretion and that of the station manager. The estimated time of arrival in Kaduna was 07:46 UTC. Kaduna cleared the flight for an approach to runway 05. However, the captain requested to land on runway 23. The air traffic controller reminded him that the wind was from 090 magnetic, which was a tailwind for runway 23, but the pilot insisted on using runway 23. The captain eventually accepted landing with a tailwind.

Flight 357 then began its descent at 07:42 UTC and was cleared to descend to 3,500 feet (1,100 m) and then 500 feet (150 m). The crew attempted to align the aircraft with the runway. The first officer asked the captain, "Can you make it to land from that position?" A cockpit observer suggested going downwind, presumably to reposition the aircraft for an approach to runway 05. However, the captain gave no response and the approach continued despite the aircraft being unstable. The turn to the left was very steep, causing the Boeing 737 to become misaligned with the runway centreline; the pilot turned to the right to correct the course. The observer had to shout, "Watch the wing," as the wings could have struck the ground during the landing. The crew was still struggling to align the aircraft with the runway.

The aircraft touched down only 615 m from the end of runway 05, after overrunning 79.5% of the runway's total length. The captain deployed the thrust reversers. When a runway excursion became inevitable, the captain steered the aircraft to the left in an attempt to use the final exit taxiway and avoid the runway end lights. At this point, the aircraft entered an uncontrollable skid. The right wing struck the ground, rupturing the fuel tanks and causing a large fire. This was also followed by an explosion. Passengers and crew members rushed to escape from the burning wreckage. 66 people were injured in the accident, 14 of them seriously. Eleven passengers were killed.

The Economist Intelligence Unit stated that "This incident is symptomatic of the problems facing the new management team" of the airline; in August 1995 the airline's board of managers had been replaced.

== Aftermath ==
=== Impact ===
The crash was another loss for the fleet of Nigerian Airways, that had been severely reduced after many aircraft had been grounded abroad due to unpaid bills.

The accident raised publicly concerns in international media about the safety of Nigerian aircraft and airports as the crash was the second aircraft crash in a short time in Nigeria and the fourth Nigerian aircraft that crashed in five months. These crashes included a cargo aircraft that crashed in January 1995, killing all three crew members and the crash of a McDonnell Douglas DC-10 that caught fire shortly after takeoff in February.
