= Caspian Airlines Flight 6936 =

2020 aircraft accident in Iran

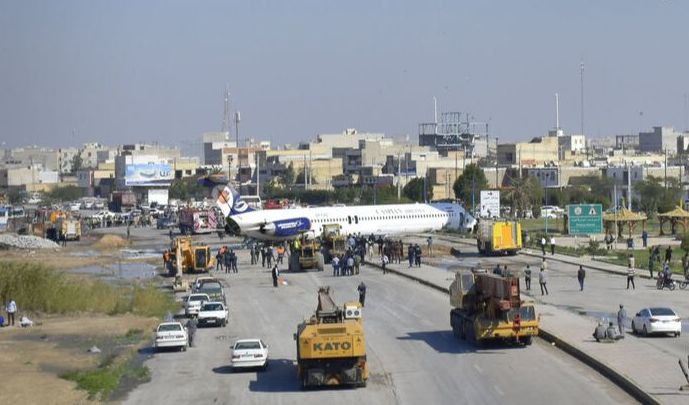
- The aircraft lying in the road after overrunning the runway

Accident
- Date: 27 January 2020
- Summary: Runway excursion after an unstabilized approach
- Site: Mahshahr Airport, Iran; 30°32′46″N 49°9′47″E

Aircraft
- EP-CPZ, the aircraft involved in the accident, seen in 2019
- Aircraft type: McDonnell Douglas MD-83
- Operator: Caspian Airlines
- IATA flight No.: IV6936
- ICAO flight No.: CPN6936
- Call sign: CASPIAN 6936
- Registration: EP-CPZ
- Flight origin: Tehran Airport, Iran
- Destination: Mahshahr Airport
- Occupants: 144
- Passengers: 135
- Crew: 9
- Fatalities: 0
- Injuries: 2
- Survivors: 144

On 27 January 2020, Caspian Airlines Flight 6936 overran the runway on landing at Mahshahr Airport, Iran, on a domestic flight from Tehran. All 144 people on board survived, but two occupants were injured.

== Accident ==
Flight 6936 departed from Tehran at 06:35 local time (02:05 UTC) and landed at Mahshahr Airport at 07:50.

The aircraft overran the runway on landing, ending up on the Mahshahr-Sarbandar Expressway, 170 metres (560 ft) past the end of the runway

All 144 people on board, including 135 passengers, survived with only two injuries. The aircraft's landing gear collapsed during the overrun.

Although there were only two injuries, the aircraft received such substantial damage that the Accident Investigation Board assessed the aircraft as destroyed.

A witness said that the aircraft's undercarriage did not appear to be fully down as it came in to land. The head of Khuzestan province's aviation authority stated that the aircraft landed long on the runway, causing the overrun.

== Aircraft and crew ==
The accident aircraft was a McDonnell Douglas MD-83, registration EP-CPZ, msn 53464.

The captain was a 64-year-old man, who had joined Caspian in 2019, having previously flown for Kish Air and the Iranian Navy. He had 18,430 flight hours, including 7,840 hours on the MD-80. The first officer was a 28-year-old man, who had logged 300 flight hours, with 124 of them on the MD-80.

== Investigation ==
The accident was investigated by Iran Civil Aviation Organization. On the final report released on 1 September 2020, it was established that the accident was caused by an unstabilized approach that lead to a runway overrun, all of which occurred due to crew errors which are poor decision making about the risk of high-speed landings, poor crew resource management (CRM) and incorrect judgement in not making an appropriate Go-around while performing the unstabilized approach. Three more contributory factors were also discovered on the report which were: the decision to load five extra tons of fuel which increased the required landing distance, the decision by the pilots to make the landing on runway 13 despite the tailwind and the inability of the copilot (Pilot Monitoring) to take control of the aircraft and make proper action to execute the Go-around.

== Aftermath ==
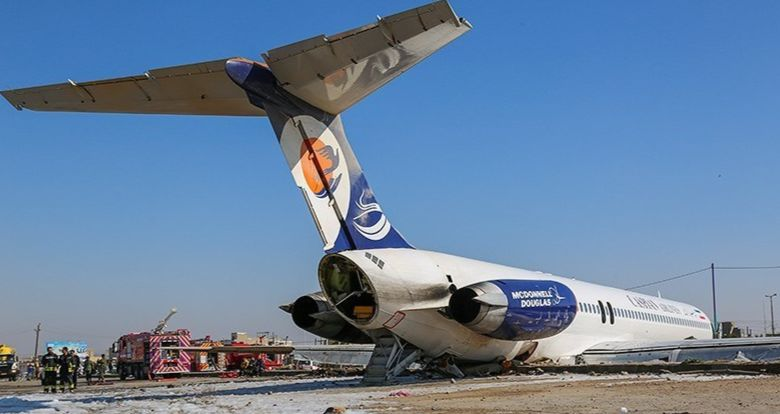
Ground view from the back

After the results of the investigation were released, the Aircraft Accident Investigation Board of Iran issued some recommendations, three to the Iran Civil Aviation Organization which are intended to provide guidance and mandate additional training for pilots and dispatchers of all operators regarding various internal aspects and to improve the situation of certain airports, four to Caspian Airlines that are focused to improve some systems to assist pilots and one each to Mahshahr Airport where it says to follow the CAO. IRI aerodrome requirements for air navigation services (ANS), check if there are any obstacles in the airport infrastructures and review their instrument approach procedures and the other one recommendation to the Iran Airports and Air Navigation Company (IAC) to provide training guidelines for air traffic service (ATS) personnel about the agreed coordination between ATS units that are involved.
