= Runway safety =

Safety of operations on aircraft runways

Runway safety is concerned with reducing harm that could occur on an aircraft runway. Safety means avoiding incorrect presence (incursion) of aircraft, inappropriate exits (excursion) and use of the wrong runway due to confusion. The runway condition is a runway's current status due to meteorological conditions and air safety.

== Definitions of runway accidents ==
Several terms fall under the flight safety topic of runway safety, including incursion, excursion, and confusion.

=== Runway incursion ===
Runway incursion involves an aircraft, and a second aircraft, vehicle, or person. It is defined by ICAO and the U.S. FAA as "Any occurrence at an aerodrome involving the incorrect presence of an aircraft, vehicle or person on the protected area of a surface designated for the landing and take off of aircraft."

=== Runway excursion ===
Runway excursion is an incident involving only a single aircraft, where it makes an inappropriate exit from the runway. This can happen because of pilot error, poor weather, or a fault with the aircraft. A runway overrun is a type of excursion where the aircraft is unable to stop before the end of the runway.

Runway excursion is the most frequent type of landing accident, slightly ahead of runway incursion. For runway accidents recorded between 1995 and 2007, 96% were of the 'excursion' type.

=== Confusion ===
Runway confusion is when a single aircraft uses the wrong runway, or a taxiway, for takeoff or landing. Runway confusions are considered a subset of runway incursions. Three major factors that increase the risk of runway confusion include airport complexity, close proximity of runway thresholds, and joint use of a runway as a taxiway. Examples of runway confusion incidents include Singapore Airlines Flight 006, Comair Flight 5191 and Air Canada Flight 759.

== Monitoring of runway safety ==
The U.S. FAA publishes an annual report on runway safety issues, available from the FAA website. New systems designed to improve runway safety, such as Airport Movement Area Safety System (AMASS) and Runway Awareness and Advisory System (RAAS), are discussed in the report. AMASS narrowly prevented a serious collision in the 2007 San Francisco International Airport runway incursion.

In the 1990s, the U.S. FAA conducted a study about a civilian version of 3D military thrust vectoring to prevent jetliner catastrophes

Some instruments for runway safety include ILS, LLWAS, microwave landing system, transponder landing system, Runway Awareness and Advisory System, and airport surveillance and broadcast systems.

== Meteorological conditions ==
The "runway condition" is a runway's current status in relation to current meteorological conditions and air safety.

- Dry: the surface of the runway is clear of water, snow or ice.
- Damp: change of color on the surface due to moisture.
- Wet: the surface of the runway is soaked but there are no significant patches of standing water.
- Water patches: patches of standing water are visible.
- Flooded: there is extensive standing water.

According to the JAR definition, a runway with water patches or that is flooded is considered to be contaminated.

Takeoff and Landing Performance Assessment (TALPA) was introduced in 2016, whereby airport operators report Runway Condition Codes (RWYCC) for take-off and landing.

== See also ==
- Index of aviation articles
- Runway safety area
