= Philippine Airlines Flight 137 =

1998 aviation accident in the Philippines

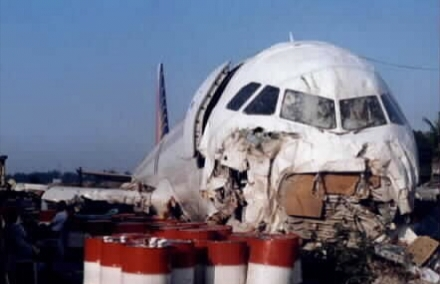
- The damage to the aircraft

Accident
- Date: March 22, 1998
- Summary: Runway overrun caused by pilot error
- Site: Bacolod City Domestic Airport; 10°39′01″N 122°56′11″E
- Total fatalities: 3
- Total injuries: 69

Aircraft
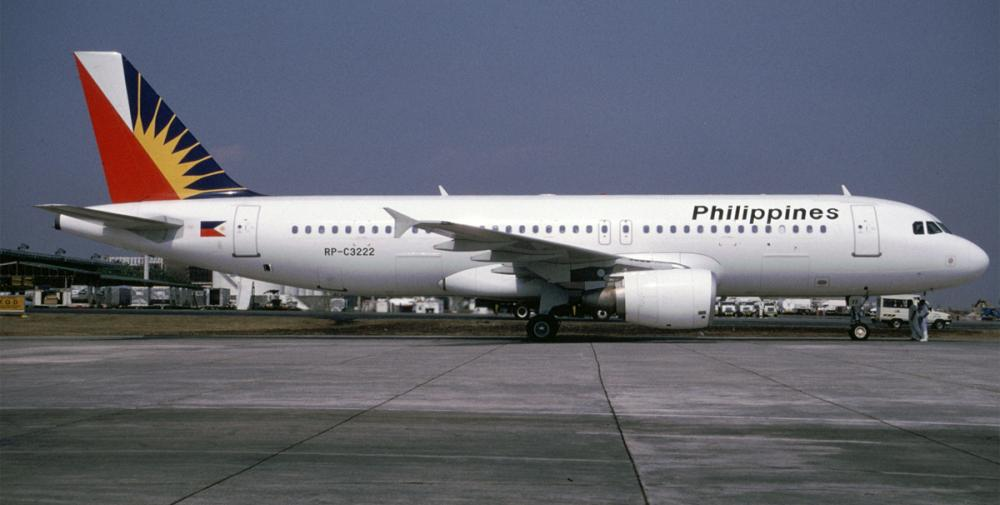
- RP-C3222, the aircraft involved in the accident
- Aircraft type: Airbus A320-214
- Operator: Philippine Airlines
- IATA flight No.: PR137
- ICAO flight No.: PAL137
- Call sign: PHILIPPINE 137
- Registration: RP-C3222
- Flight origin: Ninoy Aquino International Airport, Metro Manila, Philippines
- Destination: Bacolod City Domestic Airport, Bacolod, Philippines
- Occupants: 130
- Passengers: 124
- Crew: 6
- Fatalities: 0
- Injuries: 44
- Survivors: 130

Ground casualties
- Ground fatalities: 3
- Ground injuries: 25

Philippine Airlines Flight 137 was a scheduled passenger flight from Ninoy Aquino International Airport in Metro Manila to Bacolod City Domestic Airport in Bacolod. The Airbus A320 overran the runway on landing which resulted in the deaths of three people on the ground whereas none out of the 124 passengers and 6 crew were killed.

== Background ==
=== Aircraft ===
The aircraft involved was an Airbus A320-214 registered as RP-C3222. Being manufactured in 1997, it was a year old and had the manufacturing number of 708. The total amount of flight hours for the aircraft was 1224.

== Accident ==
Flight 137 took off from Manila at 6:40 p.m. and landed at Bacolod City Domestic Airport at 7:37 p.m. after receiving permission from air traffic controllers to land on Runway 04.

This approach was made with the autothrottle in speed mode. The throttle lever of the first engine on the left side of the fuselage was located in the position of ascending thrust. When the aircraft landed, the throttle of the second engine was placed in the thrust reverse position, but the throttle of the first engine was not returned to the idle position and remained in the ascending position. The co-pilot said that the spoiler and thrust reverser did not work and did not slow down. The spoiler did not start because one engine was in the thrust reverse position and the other was in the ascending thrust position. The second engine was set to reverse thrust, so the autothrottle was released. Since the throttle lever of the first engine was in the ascending thrust position, the thrust began to increase when the autothrottle was released. Due to the asymmetrical thrust, the aircraft began to deviate to the right, so the pilot tried to keep the aircraft on the runway using rudders, but at this speed, the rudder and nose wheel steering had no effect, and the aircraft went through the fence around the perimeter of the airport. When operated from the rudder pedals, the nose wheel steering angle is limited to 6 degrees, and hand-steering is disabled at speeds above 70 knots (130 km/h; 81 mph). The fire that broke out after the accident was extinguished by the timely response of the ATO Accident Fire Rescue Team with the cooperation of the Bacolod City Fire Brigade. All passengers and crew were unharmed, but three people in the area were killed.

== Investigation ==
The investigation into the accident was conducted by the CAB. The investigation revealed that a selection by the pilot of the wrong mode on the onboard flight computers by the pilot prevented the power from being reduced to idle, which, in turn inhibited the use of the thrust reverser and spoilers. The affected engine was shut down, and the brakes were applied, but the aircraft was unable to stop before the end of the runway.

== See also ==
- TAM Airlines Flight 3054 – Another A320 that crashed nine years later under almost identical circumstances, with 199 fatalities.
- Korean Air Flight 631 – another runway excursion incident in the Philippines which happened 24 years later.
- Runway excursion
