= Air Canada Flight 759 =

2017 aviation incident

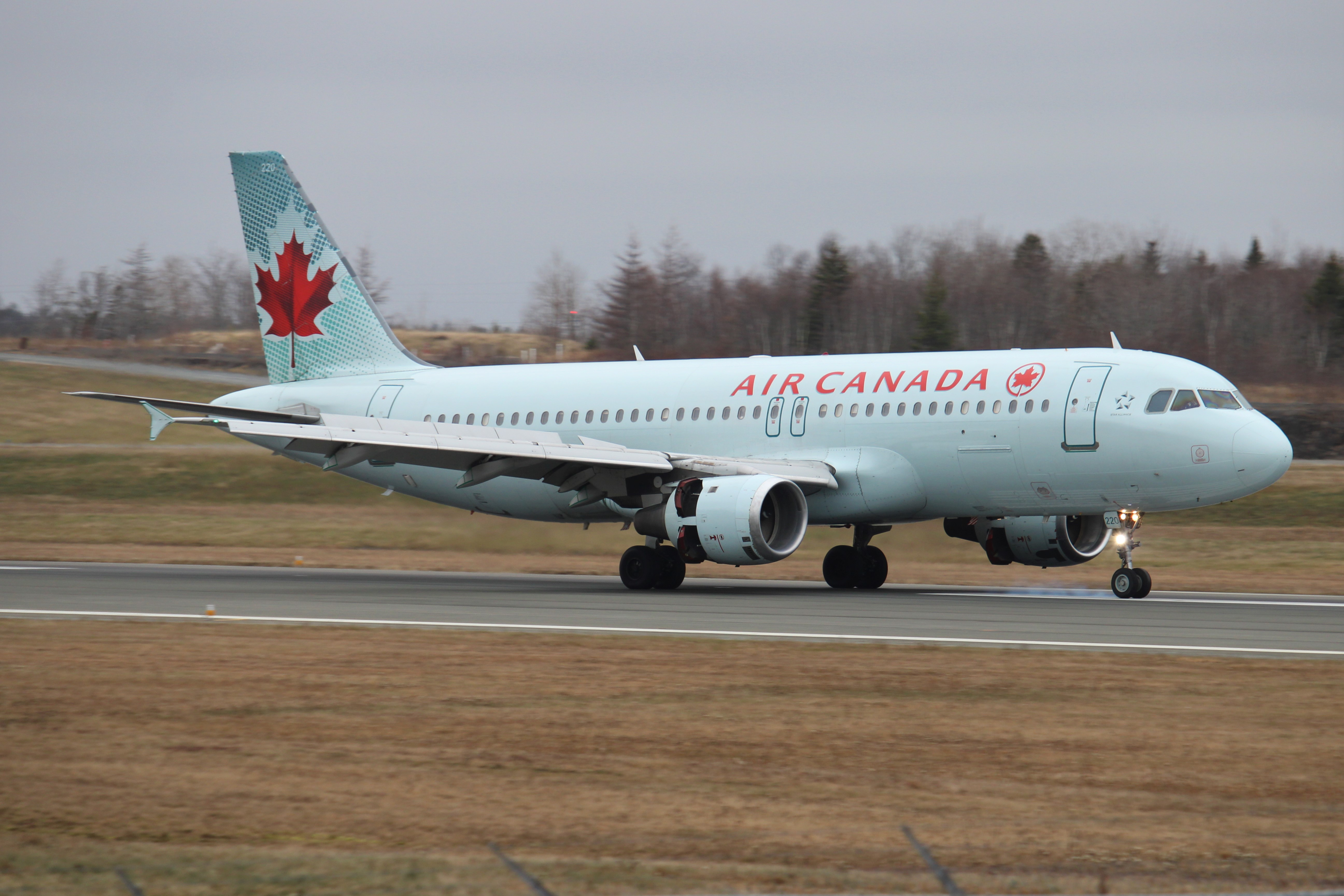
- C-FKCK, the aircraft involved, 2 years after the incident

Incident
- Date: July 7, 2017
- Summary: Near collision on final approach at night
- Site: San Francisco International Airport, Millbrae, California, United States; 37°36′58″N 122°21′34″W

Aircraft
- Aircraft type: Airbus A320-211
- Operator: Air Canada
- IATA flight No.: AC759
- ICAO flight No.: ACA759
- Call sign: AIR CANADA 759
- Registration: C-FKCK
- Flight origin: Toronto Pearson International Airport, Mississauga, Ontario, Canada
- Destination: San Francisco International Airport, San Francisco, California, United States
- Occupants: 140
- Passengers: 135
- Crew: 5
- Fatalities: 0
- Survivors: 140

On July 7, 2017, an Airbus A320 operating as Air Canada Flight 759 was nearly involved in an accident at San Francisco International Airport in San Mateo County, California, United States. The flight, which originated at Toronto Pearson International Airport, had been cleared by air traffic control to land on runway 28R and was on final approach to land on that runway; however, instead of lining up with the runway, the aircraft had lined up with the parallel taxiway, on which four fully loaded and fuelled passenger airplanes were stopped awaiting takeoff clearance. The flight crew initiated a go-around prior to landing, after which it landed on 28R without further incident. The aircraft on the taxiway departed for their intended destinations without further incident. The subsequent investigation by the National Transportation Safety Board (NTSB) determined that the Air Canada airplane descended to 59 feet (18 m) above the ground before it began its climb, and that it missed colliding with one of the aircraft on the taxiway by 14 feet (4.3 m).

The NTSB determined the probable cause was the Air Canada flight crew's confusion of the runway with the parallel taxiway, with contributing causes including the crew's failure to use the instrument landing system (ILS), as well as pilot fatigue. A retired pilot stated the runway confusion that almost happened "probably came close to the greatest aviation disaster in history" as five airplanes and potentially over 1,000 passengers were at imminent risk of a disaster greater than the Tenerife airport disaster.

== Incident ==
Diagram of Runway 28R and Taxiway C at SFO. AC 759 mistakenly lined up to land on Taxiway C, shown with the dotted blue line, instead of Runway 28R, shown with the dashed white line, before being ordered to abort the landing.

At 11:46 p.m. local time, Air Canada Flight 759 (AC 759), carrying 135 passengers and 5 crew members, was cleared to land on Runway 28R. The adjacent Runway 28L had been closed at 10 p.m. local time and its lights were off, except for a 20.5-foot-wide (6.2 m) lighted flashing "X" at the eastern runway threshold. The captain was flying the aircraft and the first officer was monitoring. The two pilots of AC 759 acknowledged that they mistook runway 28R for 28L and therefore lined up for landing on the parallel taxiway C, even though runways and taxiways are lit with different colours and intensities. Preliminary post-event investigation results noted that Runway 28R and Taxiway C were lit on default settings (in different colours), and the automatic terminal information service broadcast information was current and advised that 28L was closed and unlit. According to preliminary Transportation Board investigation results, as the weather was clear, the pilots of AC 759 were not required to utilize the instrument landing system and relied instead on a visual approach, as typical for the prevailing conditions.

On Taxiway C, four airplanes were queueing for takeoff, three from United Airlines and one from Philippine Airlines. At 11:55:46 p.m. local time, upon spotting aircraft lights approximately 0.7 miles (1.1 km) from the runway, the pilot of AC 759 asked the tower if he was clear to land on 28R, to which the air traffic controller responded at 11:55:56 p.m., "There's no one on 28R but you," when AC 759 was approximately 0.3 miles (500 m) from the runway threshold. The AC 759 pilots "did not recall seeing aircraft on Taxiway C, but something did not look right to them", according to a post-incident interview summary. The pilot of United Airlines Flight 1 (UA 001), the first in line for takeoff, interrupted the radio traffic at 11:56:01 p.m. and asked "Where is this guy going? He's on the taxiway." The crew of Philippine Airlines Flight 115 (PR 115) turned on their landing lights to alert AC 759 they were lined up on the taxiway. Then the captain of AC 759 initiated a go-around, around the same time as the first officer called for a go-around. The air traffic controller ordered AC 759 to abort the landing at 11:56:10 p.m. After AC 759 acknowledged the go-around, the air traffic controller stated, "It looks like you were lined up for Charlie [Taxiway C] there." AC 759 had already started to climb before the go-around order.

Afterwards, the pilot of UA 001 radioed the tower saying, "Air Canada flew directly over us," and the air traffic controller responded, "Yeah, I saw that, guys." During the first approach, AC 759 flew for 1/4 mile (400 m) over Taxiway C, descended to an altitude as low as 81 feet (25 m) and approached as close as 29 feet (8.8 m) laterally to the four airplanes waiting on Taxiway C before being ordered to abort the landing. According to the flight data recorder, the pilots advanced the thrust levers when the airplane was 85 feet (26 m) above the ground. The airplane descended as low as 59 feet (18 m), approximately 2.5 seconds after the thrust levers had been advanced. There was less than 10 to 20 feet (3 to 6 m) separation between the bottom of the Air Canada aircraft and the tail of the Philippine Airlines Airbus A340 aircraft, which was the second airplane on the taxiway. Following a reconstruction of events, one pilot not involved in the incident noted that had the crew waited five more seconds before pulling up, it would have collided with the third airplane on the taxiway, which was that of United Airlines Flight 863 (UAL 863).

SFO was the first airport in the United States to install an Airport Surface Surveillance Capability (ASSC) system, which should have alerted the tower of a potential conflict between runway and taxiway movements. AC 759 disappeared from the local controller's ASSC display for twelve seconds, between 11:55:52 and 11:56:04 p.m. local time (from shortly after the AC 759 pilot asked for confirmation that 28R was clear, to the time the UA 001 pilot noted that AC 759 was lined up for Taxiway C), as AC 759 was too far off-course from 28R.

AC 759 completed its go-around and landed without incident after the second approach. A single air traffic controller was monitoring ground and tower frequencies, which would typically be handled by two controllers.

== Aircraft ==
The aircraft flying AC 759 that night was C-FKCK, an Airbus A320-200. The aircraft was approximately 25 years old at the time of the incident, getting its airworthiness certificate on January 17, 1992.

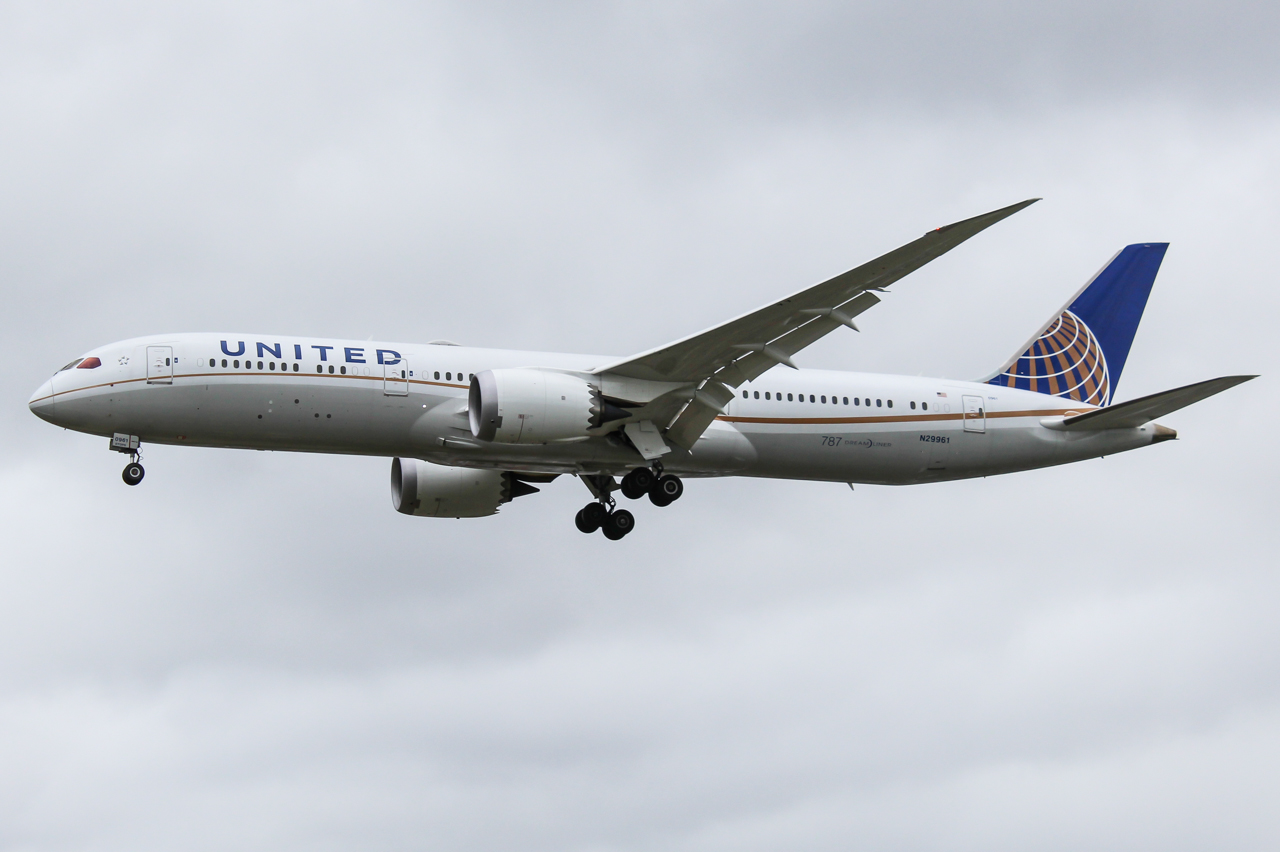
N29961, the Boeing 787-9 involved as UA 001

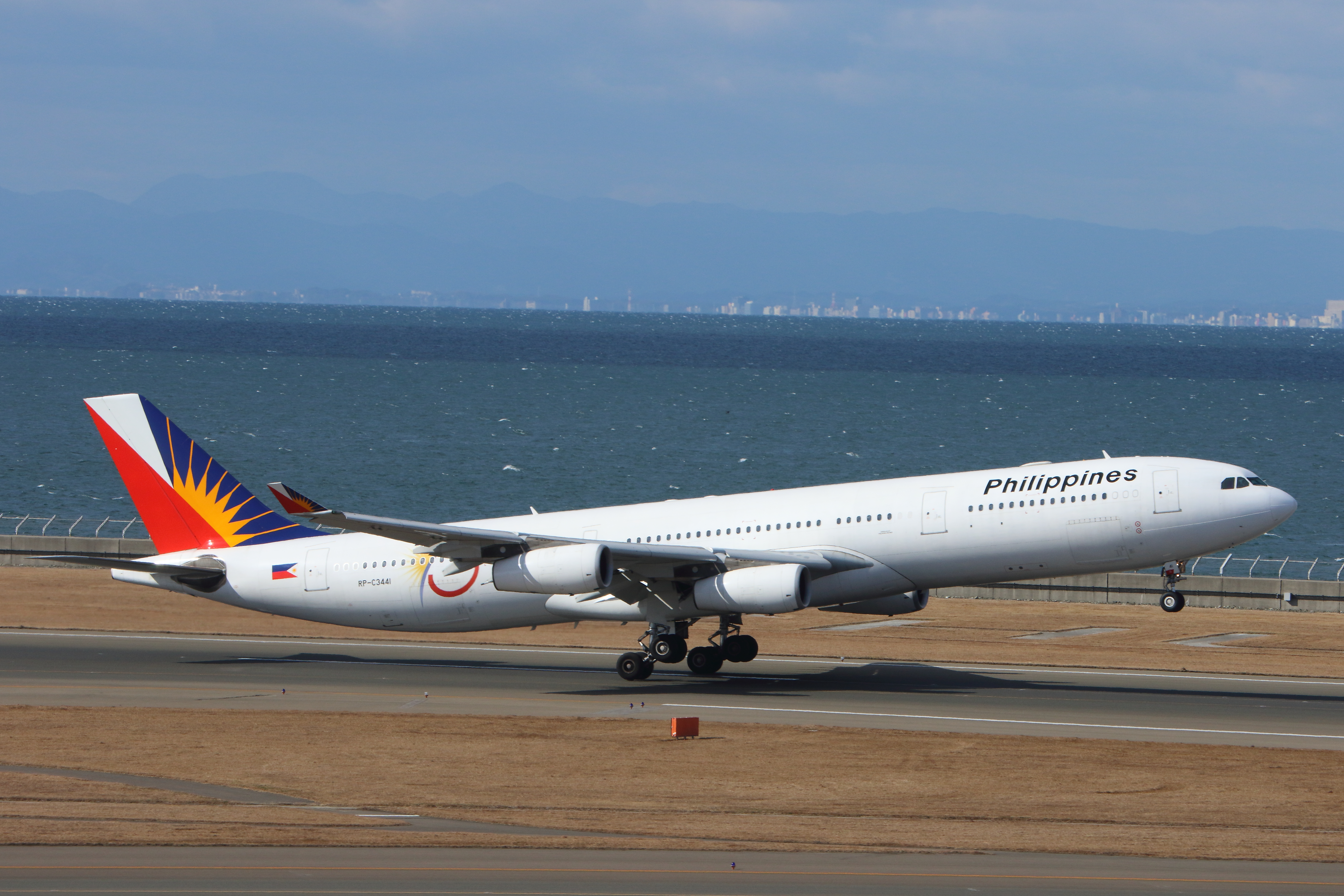
RP-C3441, the Airbus A340-300 involved as PR 115

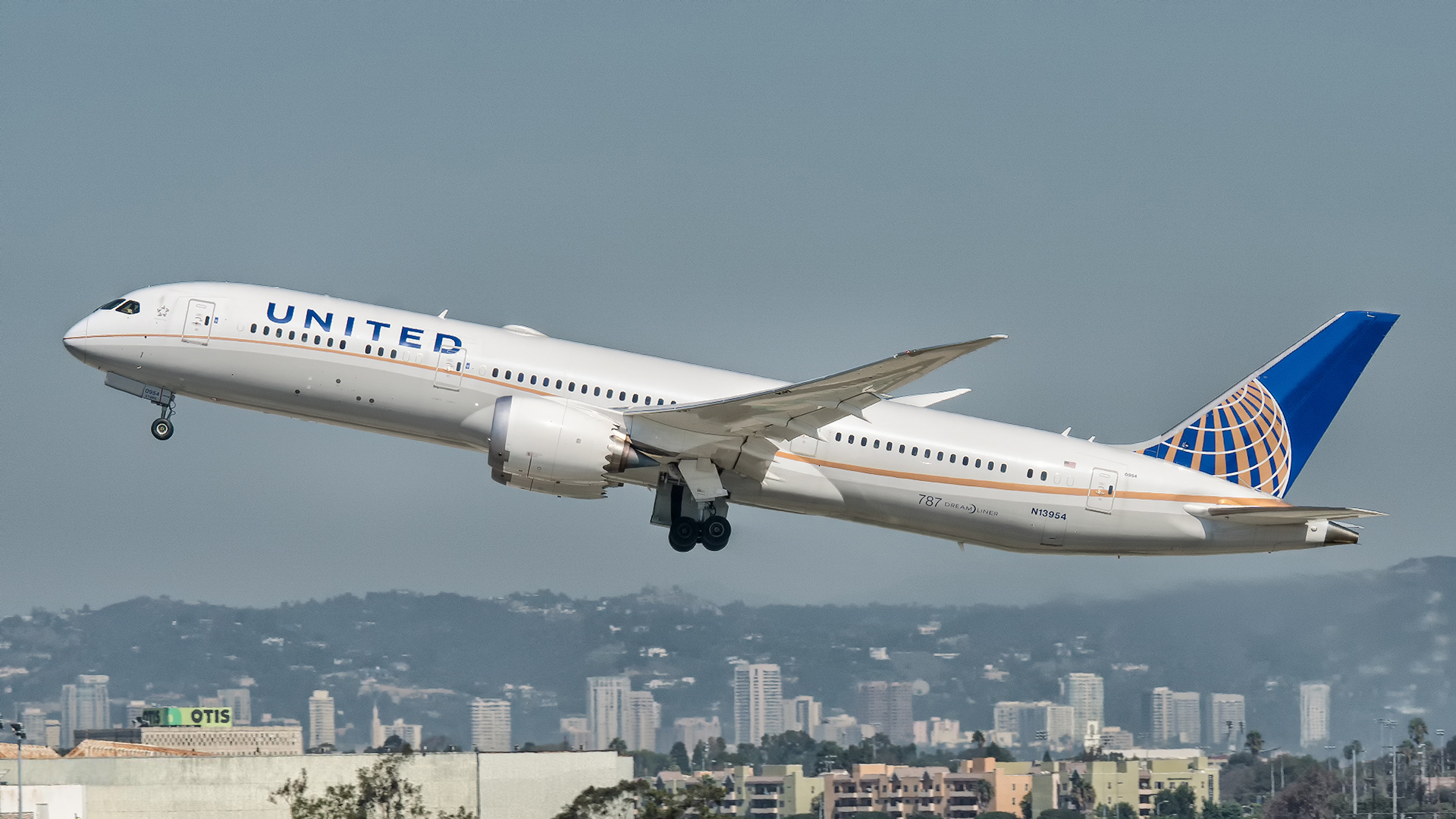
N13954, the Boeing 787-9 involved as UA 863

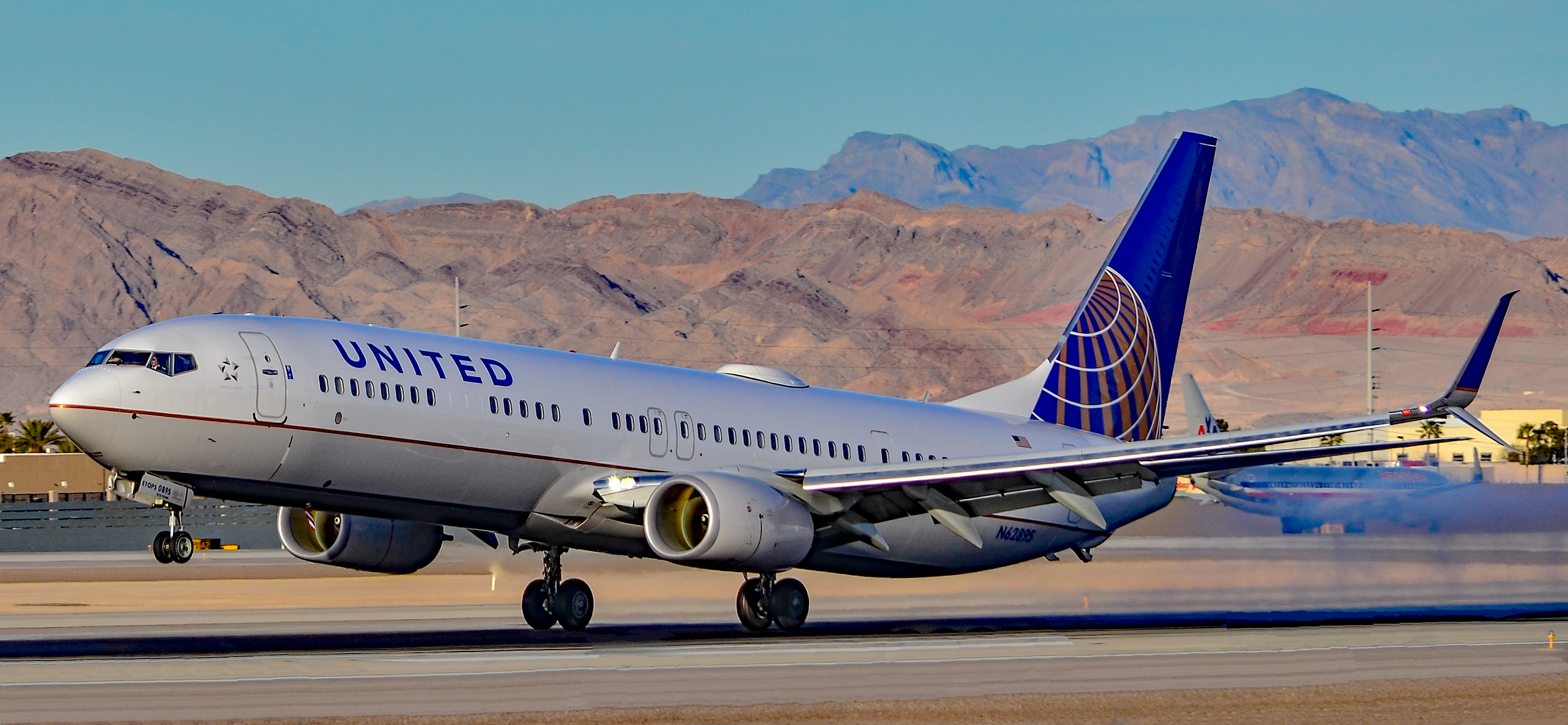
N62895, the Boeing 737-900ER involved as UA 1118

Aircraft and flights involved in the incident
Airline	Flight #	Aircraft	Capacity	Registration	Origin	Destination
Air Canada	ACA 759	Airbus A320-200	146	C-FKCK	Toronto	San Francisco
United Airlines	UAL 001	Boeing 787-9	252	N29961	San Francisco	Singapore
Philippine Airlines	PAL 115	Airbus A340-300	254	RP-C3441	San Francisco	Manila
United Airlines	UAL 863	Boeing 787-9	252	N13954	San Francisco	Sydney
United Airlines	UAL 1118	Boeing 737-900ER	179	N62895	San Francisco	Cancún

== Investigation ==
The incident was not considered reportable under then-current federal regulations. However, former NTSB chairman Jim Hall called it "the most significant near-miss we've had in this decade" and urged the NTSB to re-evaluate those reporting requirements. The United States National Transportation Safety Board (NTSB) was informed of the incident on July 9 and took the lead on the investigation with assistance from the Federal Aviation Administration (FAA). The Transportation Safety Board of Canada (TSB) served as a facilitator to convey information between Air Canada and the NTSB. TSB released preliminary information from Occurrence No. A17F0159 on July 11, 2017. NTSB assigned identification number DCA17IA148 to the incident.

A retired pilot stated that SFO requires "precision flying" as the two runways (28R and 28L) are laterally separated by 750 feet (230 m), and Taxiway C is separated from 28R by less than 500 feet (150 m). Other pilots pointed out that some airlines require all aircraft to use the instrument landing system (ILS) regardless of weather or visibility, which would have led the crew to realize that they were not lined up with runway 28R. Dave Jones, then-California Insurance Commissioner and a passenger on AC759, wrote a letter to Air Canada a week after the incident requesting their cooperation with the investigation.

Preliminary NTSB investigation results from flight data recorder telemetry, released on August 2, 2017, indicate that AC759 reached a minimum altitude of 59 feet (18 m) above ground level, comparable to the 55 ft 10 in (17.02 m) tail height of a Boeing 787-9, two of which were on Taxiway C. The cockpit voice recorder had been overwritten before the investigation was launched, as C-FKCK flew three more flights on July 8 before the NTSB was informed of the near-miss on July 9.

=== Final stages ===
In a September 25, 2018, board meeting, the NTSB cited as probable cause the pilots mistaking taxiway C for runway 28R due to overlooking the closure of runway 28L in the NOTAM report. Contributing factors included not taking advantage of the ILS, which was not in use by the flight crew, in the flight management system (FMS) visual approach; and pilot fatigue. The crew's body clock was at the Toronto 03:00 Eastern Time: the first officer had no significant rest for 12 hours, and the captain for 19 hours. The captain would not have been able to fly under United States rules concerning rest to avoid pilot fatigue. Transport Canada planned to bring its pilot rest rules in line with international standards later in 2018. New regulations were announced in December 2018, closer to international standards but criticized as substandard by the Air Canada Pilots Association.

The Federal Aviation Administration (FAA) received six recommendations: identifying approaches requiring an unusual manual frequency input; displaying it noticeably on aeronautical charts; reviewing NOTAMs to prioritize and present relevant information; requiring aircraft landing in B or C airspace to alert pilots when not aligned with a runway; modifying airports to alert on collision risks and clearly showing closed runways, as construction lighting on 28L looked like ramp lighting.

Air Canada is simplifying its SFO approach charts and includes SFO-specific training in aircraft simulators, trains its staff to reduce expectation bias, and will retrofit new aircraft like the Airbus A220 and Boeing 737 MAX with dual head-up displays to enhance situational awareness in low-visibility, high-risk approaches.

The NTSB published their final report in September 2018; five recommendations were made.

As the pilots were slow to report the incident, the airplane had made another flight and the cockpit voice recording was recorded over. The NTSB has stated that it wants faster incident reporting and considers recommending capturing the last 25 hours, an increase from two hours.

A former NTSB investigator observed deficiencies in the investigation, criticizing the board for avoiding introspection and indicating that it is more reactive than proactive. The report faults Air Canada for reporting too late and erasing the voice record, but notes that the NTSB only requires notification when an aircraft lands or departs on a taxiway, or when a collision is avoided after a runway incursion, and neither happened. It also dismisses a comparable taxiway mishap in Seattle-Tacoma by Alaska Airlines (Flight 27) in December 2015, that was still in the preliminary investigation stage at the time (NTSB assigned identification number DCA16IA036 to the incident).

The recommendation to improve the NOTAM system led to an ICAO initiative to reform it. Robert Sumwalt, Chairman of the NTSB, described NOTAMs as "a bunch of garbage that nobody pays any attention to".

== Aftermath ==
Following the incident, in early August the Federal Aviation Administration modified nighttime landing procedures at SFO, forbidding visual approaches at night "when an adjacent parallel runway is closed" and replacing them with instrument approaches, either ILS or satellite-based, and requiring two air traffic controllers in the control tower "until the late-night arrival rush is over".

== See also ==
- Accidents and incidents involving the Airbus A320 family
- Tenerife airport disaster
