= Mahshahr Airport =

- IATA: MRX; ICAO: OIAM

Summary
- Airport type: Public
- Owner: Government of Iran
- Operator: Iran Airports Company
- Location: Mahshahr, Iran
- Elevation AMSL: 8 ft (2.4 m)
- Coordinates: 30°33′22.29″N 049°09′06.77″E

Map
- Location of airport in Iran

Runways
Direction	Length		Surface
Direction	ft	m	Surface
13/31	8,874	2,705	Asphalt
- Source: World Aero Data

Mahshahr Airport (IATA: MRX, ICAO: OIAM) is an airport in Mahshahr, in Iran's Khuzestan province.

== Airlines and destinations ==
Airlines	Destinations
Karun Airlines	Isfahan, Mashhad, Shiraz, Tehran–Mehrabad
Pars Air	Tehran–Mehrabad
Qeshm Air	Tehran–Mehrabad

== Accidents and incidents ==
- On 27 January 2020, Caspian Airlines Flight 6936 overran the runway on landing. All on board survived.
