= Runway Overrun Prevention System =

Airbus technology

ROPS (Runway Overrun Prevention System) is a technology used in almost every Airbus A3XX aircraft, which is designed to prevent the overshooting of the runway as the plane is landing.

Airbus tested the system at Rovaniemi Airport in Finland during the winter of 2016.
