= Rop (name) =

Rop is a surname of Kenyan origin that may refer to:

- Julius Kiptum Rop (born 1977), Kenyan marathon runner
- Rodgers Rop (born 1976), Kenyan marathon runner and winner of the 2002 Boston and New York marathons

== See also ==
- Kiprop, related name meaning "son of Rop"
- Rops (disambiguation)
