= Kaduna International Airport =

Airport serving Kaduna, Nigeria

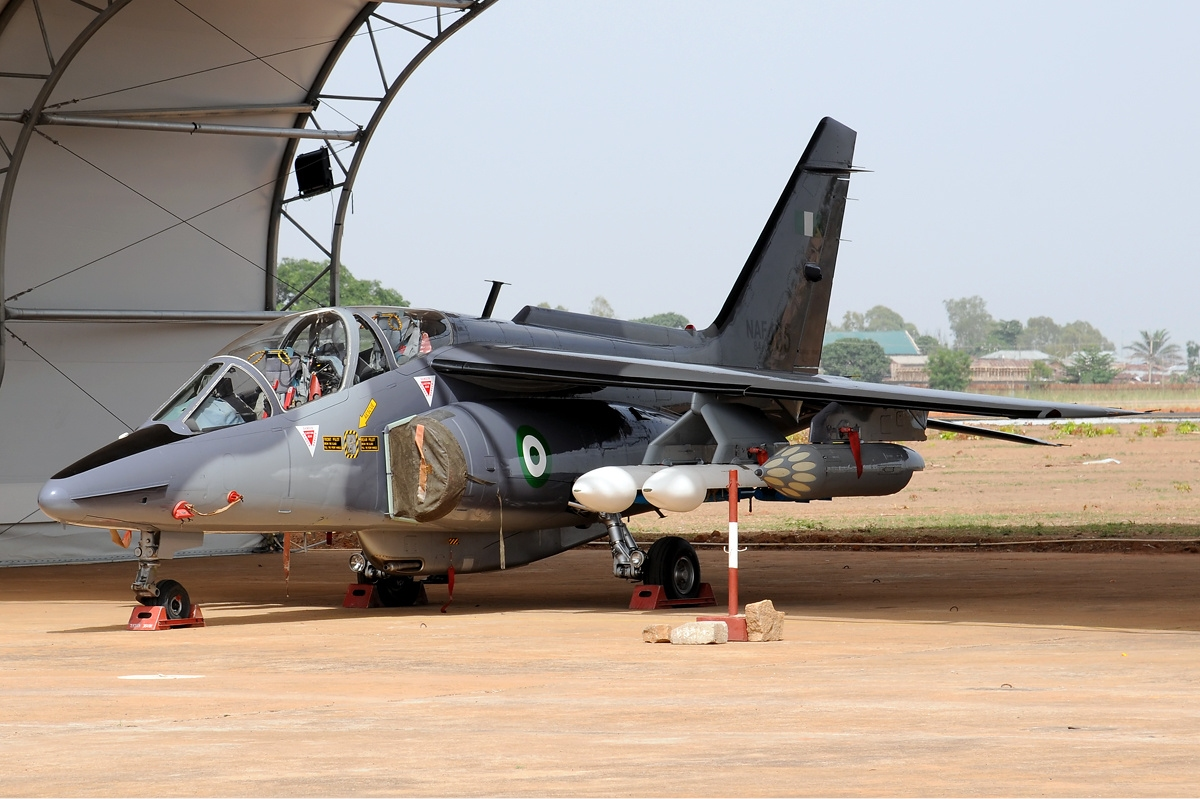
- IATA: KAD; ICAO: DNKA

Summary
- Airport type: Public / Military
- Owner/Operator: Federal Airports Authority of Nigeria (FAAN)
- Serves: Kaduna, Nigeria
- Time zone: WAT (UTC+01:00)
- Elevation AMSL: 2,073 ft (632 m)
- Coordinates: 10°41′45″N 7°19′15″E

Map
- Location of the airport in Nigeria

Runways
Direction	Length		Surface
Direction	m	ft	Surface
05/23	3,000	9,843	Asphalt
- Sources: WAD GCM Google Maps

Kaduna International Airport (now Hassan Usman Katsina Airport) (IATA: KAD, ICAO: DNKA) is an airport serving Kaduna, the capital of Kaduna State in Nigeria. The airport is around 22 kilometres (14 mi) northwest of the city. The airport opened in 1982.

The airport was attacked by bandits on 26 March 2022, killing a security guard. On the 24 October 2023 The Airport Manager of Kaduna International airport, confirmed that Flight Operations have resumed at the Airport following their suspension due to insecurity. he said "More airlines are coming back and we are prepared. We have the cooperation of all the security agencies. Everybody wants this airport to function. So, all stakeholders are rallying around us to ensure that this airport is safe for aircraft landing and take-off,” .

The Air Peace Kaduna Station Manager, Fatima Ndayako,said the airline returned to the Kaduna route due to persistent requests from their customers in dire need of their service along the route.

She assured customers that the airline would have daily operations to and from Kaduna and Lagos.

== Accidents and incidents ==
- Eleven passengers died in the crash of Nigeria Airways Flight 357 which took place at the airport in 1995.
- On 20 August 2010, Chanchangi Airlines Flight 334, involving a Boeing 737-200 5N-BIF, struck the localizer antenna and landed short of the runway. Several passengers were injured and the aircraft was substantially damaged. Chanchangi Airlines suspended operations following the accident.

== See also ==
- Transport in Nigeria
- List of airports in Nigeria
