= Bacolod City Domestic Airport =

Former airport of Bacolod, Negros Occidental, Philippines (1936–2008)

Bacolod City Domestic Airport Paliparang Domestiko ng Lungsod ng Bacolod Domestiko nga Hulugpaan sang Dakbanwa sang Bacolod
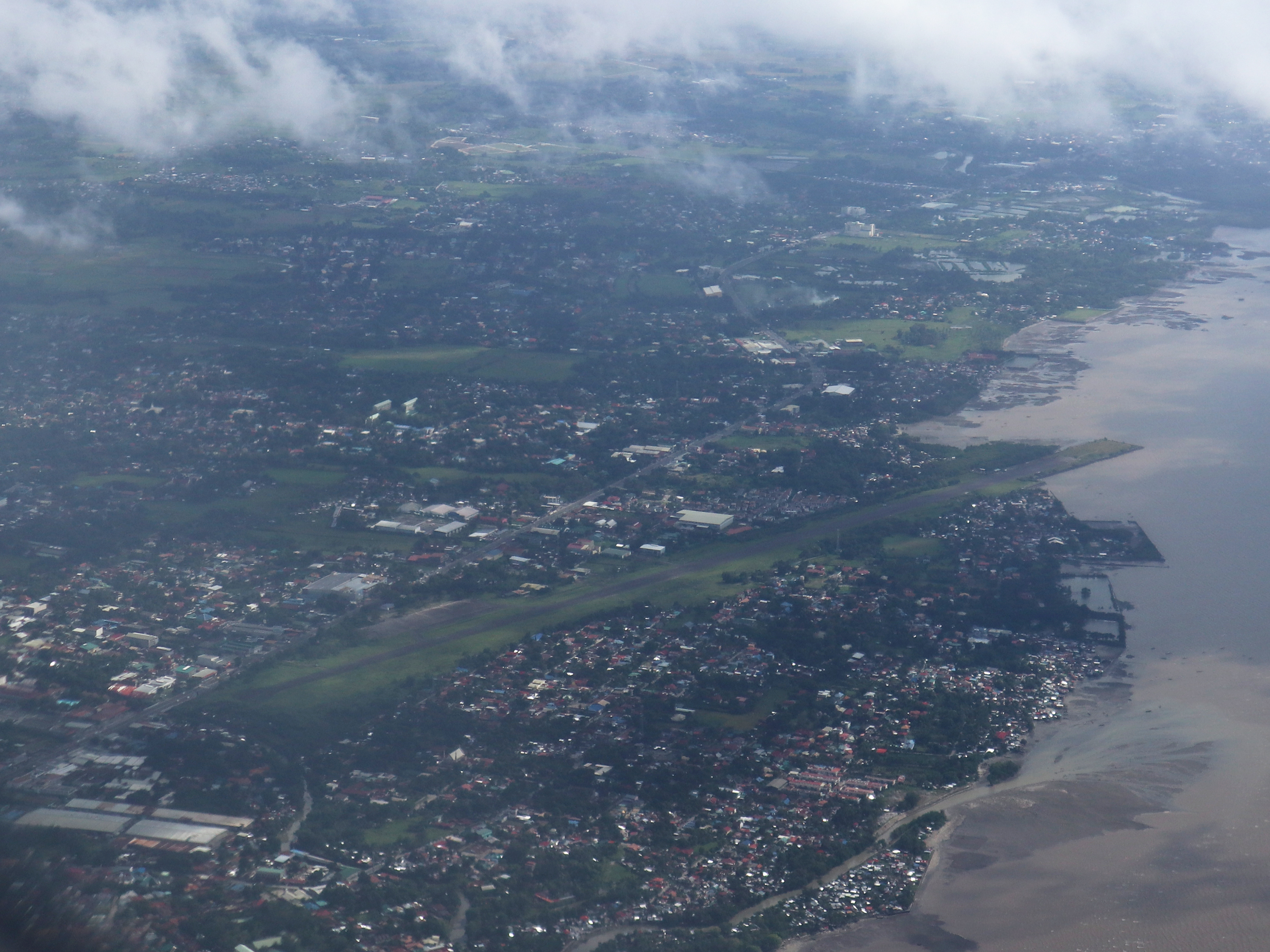
- Aerial view in November 2022, fourteen years after its closure.
- IATA: ~~BCD~~; ICAO: ~~RPVB~~

Summary
- Airport type: Defunct
- Owner/Operator: Air Transportation Office
- Serves: Bacolod
- Opened: 1936
- Closed: January 17, 2008
- Elevation AMSL: 8 m (26 ft)
- Coordinates: 10°38′33.04″N 122°55′46.62″E
- Interactive map of Bacolod City Domestic Airport

Runways
Direction	Length		Surface
Direction	m	ft	Surface
04/22	1,956	6,416	Asphalt concrete (Closed)

Bacolod City Domestic Airport (IATA: ~~BCD~~, ICAO: ~~RPVB~~), also known as Bacolod Airport during its operation, was an airport that served the general area of Bacolod, the capital city of Negros Occidental in the Philippines. It was one of the busiest airports in the Western Visayas region and was one of four trunkline airports, or major commercial domestic airports, in the region, the others being Mandurriao Airport in Iloilo City, Roxas Airport in Roxas and Puerto Princesa Airport in Puerto Princesa. This airport was replaced by the new Bacolod–Silay Airport, located in nearby Silay.

It was classified as such by the Air Transportation Office, a body of the Department of Transportation that is responsible for the operations of all other airports in the Philippines except the major international airports. As of February 2007, Cebu Pacific had increased its number of flights from Manila to Bacolod. The airport surpassed the Iloilo City Mandurriao Airport in the number of arriving passengers.

== History ==
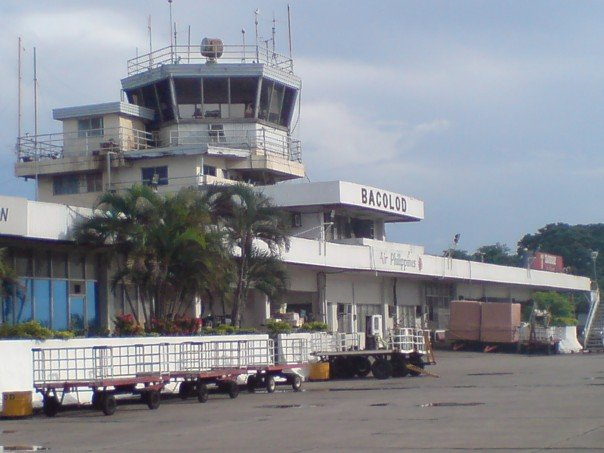
The former terminal building of the airport

The airport was built by the Lopez family in 1936 to serve the Iloilo–Negros Air Express Company's flights to and from Bacolod, Iloilo and Manila. It was bought by Philippine Airlines after World War II. The Bacolod City Domestic Airport ceased operations on 17 January 2008, prior to the opening of the Bacolod–Silay Airport which began operations the day after. Though the airport closed, the main terminal building was converted to ticketing offices, while the Cebu Pacific Terminal around 400m from it was made into an Aviation School for aircraft mechanics, as well as ground pilot training. In 2017, the main terminal was demolished.

In 2016, Senator Franklin Drilon suggested to the city government of Bacolod to re-develop the whole airport grounds into a business park, following the success of converting the Mandurriao Airport in Iloilo City into Iloilo Business Park.

== Former airlines and destinations ==
The destinations of Bacolod City Domestic Airport before its closure.

Airlines	Destinations
Air Philippines	Cebu, Manila
Cebu Pacific Air	Cebu, Manila
Philippine Airlines	Manila

== Incidents ==
On March 22, 1998, Philippine Airlines Flight 137, an Airbus A320-200 (RP-C3222) overshot the runway while attempting a landing at Bacolod. There were no casualties among the passengers and crew, but three people on the ground were killed when the plane ploughed onto the nearby residential area. The damaged aircraft was written off.

== See also ==
- List of airports in the Philippines
