= Kiprop =

Kiprop is a name used by the Kalenjin people. It means born when it is raining.

People with this name include:

- Asbel Kiprop (born 1989), Kenyan middle-distance runner
- Boniface Kiprop Toroitich (born 1985), Ugandan long-distance runner
- Fred Kiprop (born 1975), Kenyan long-distance runner
- Robert Kiprop (born 1997), Kenyan long-distance runner
- Wilson Kiprop (born 1987), Kenyan long-distance runner
