= Takeoff and Landing Performance Assessment =

Takeoff and Landing Performance Assessment (TALPA) is a method used by airport operators to determine runway conditions for takeoff and landing. It produces a Field Condition report that allows pilots to assess braking action when the runway is not dry.

TALPA assessment generates a Runway Condition Code (RWYCC) ranging from 6 to 0, where 6 indicates a dry runway and 0 signifies nil conditions, meaning braking action is minimal to non-existent.

Separate runway condition codes are published for each third of a runway, and pilots use a Runway Condition Assessment Matrix (RCAM) to calculate their aircraft performance.

TALPA was introduced by the United States Federal Aviation Authority (FAA) in 2016. The TALPA matrix was later superseded by the ICAO Global Reporting Format (GRF), which was based on TALPA and adopted on 4 November 2021.

== Runway condition codes ==
Runway condition codes
Runway condition code	Landing braking action
6	Dry
5	Good
4	Good to Medium
3	Medium
2	Medium to Poor
1	Poor
0	Nil
