= Southwest Airlines Flight 1248 =

2005 aviation accident in Illinois

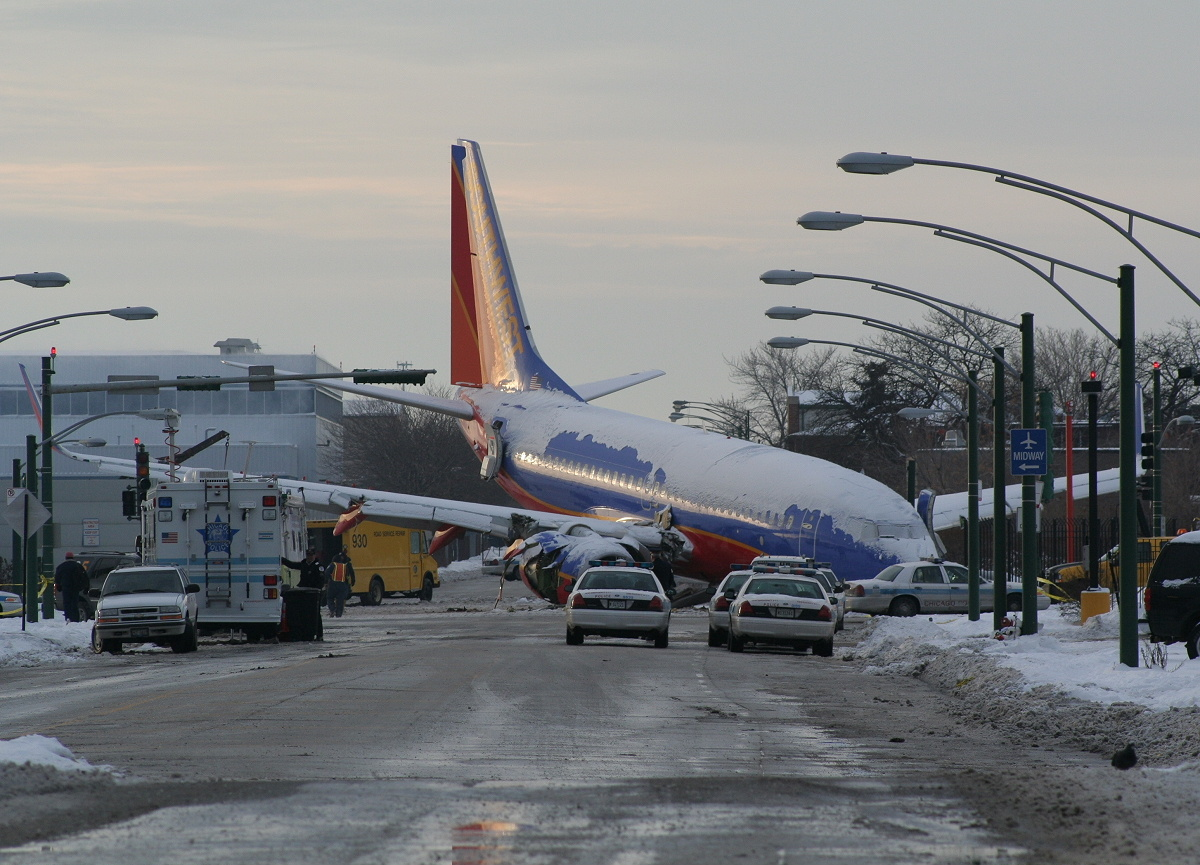
- The aircraft after overrunning the runway at Chicago Midway International Airport

Accident
- Date: December 8, 2005
- Summary: Runway overrun in snowstorm due to pilot error
- Site: Intersections of W 55th Street and S Central Avenue, Near Chicago Midway International Airport, Chicago, Illinois, United States; 41°47′32.7″N 87°45′44.4″W
- Total fatalities: 1
- Total injuries: 16

Aircraft
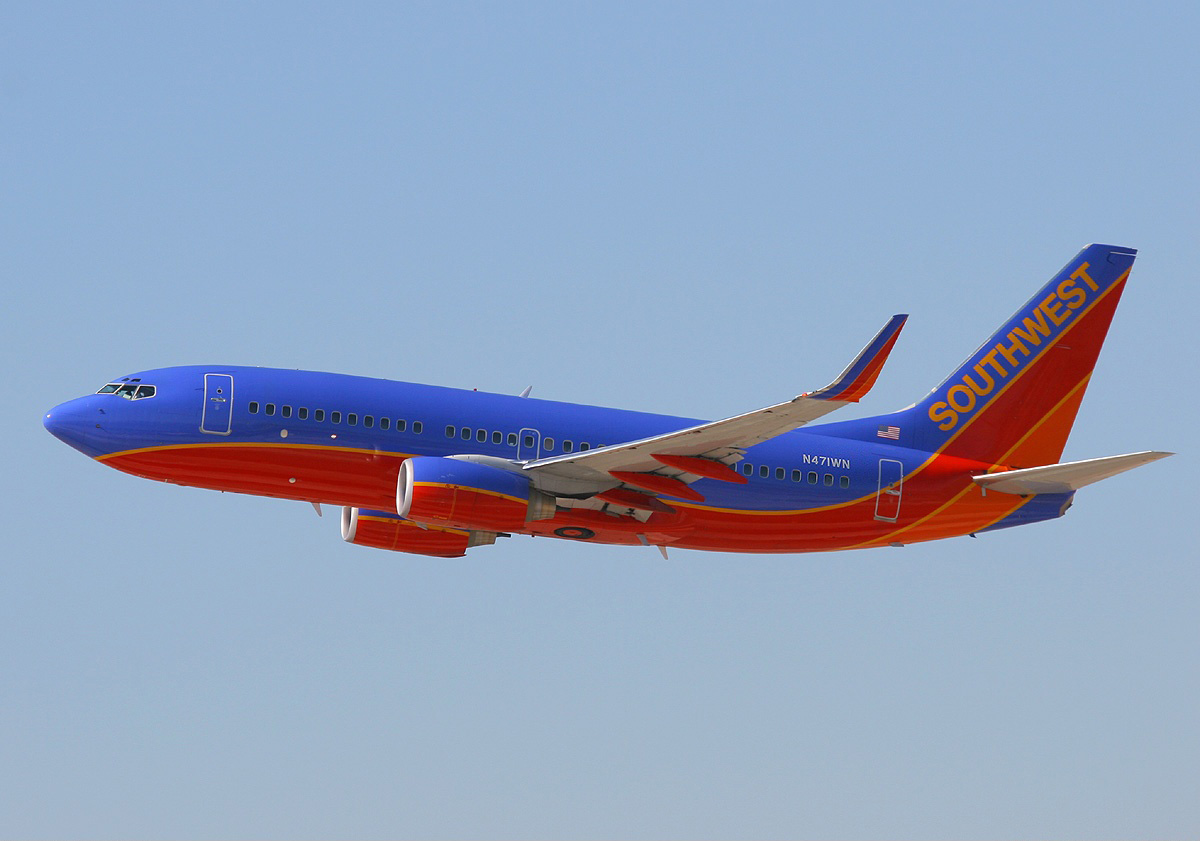
- N471WN, the aircraft involved in the accident, photographed in July 2005
- Aircraft type: Boeing 737-7H4
- Operator: Southwest Airlines
- IATA flight No.: WN1248
- ICAO flight No.: SWA1248
- Call sign: SOUTHWEST 1248
- Registration: N471WN
- Flight origin: Baltimore/Washington International Thurgood Marshall Airport, Baltimore, Maryland, United States
- 1st stopover: Chicago Midway International Airport, Chicago, Illinois, United States
- Last stopover: Salt Lake City International Airport, Salt Lake City, Utah, United States
- Destination: McCarran International Airport, Las Vegas, Nevada, United States
- Occupants: 103
- Passengers: 98
- Crew: 5
- Fatalities: 0
- Injuries: 7
- Survivors: 103

Ground casualties
- Ground fatalities: 1
- Ground injuries: 9

Southwest Airlines Flight 1248 was a scheduled passenger flight from Baltimore, Maryland, to Chicago, Illinois, continuing on to Salt Lake City, Utah, and then to Las Vegas, Nevada. On December 8, 2005, the Boeing 737-7H4 operating the flight slid off the runway at Midway International Airport in Chicago while landing in a snowstorm and crashed into automobile traffic, killing a six-year-old boy.

The aircraft involved was repaired and returned to service, and remains with Southwest to the present day as N286WN.

== Background ==
=== Aircraft ===
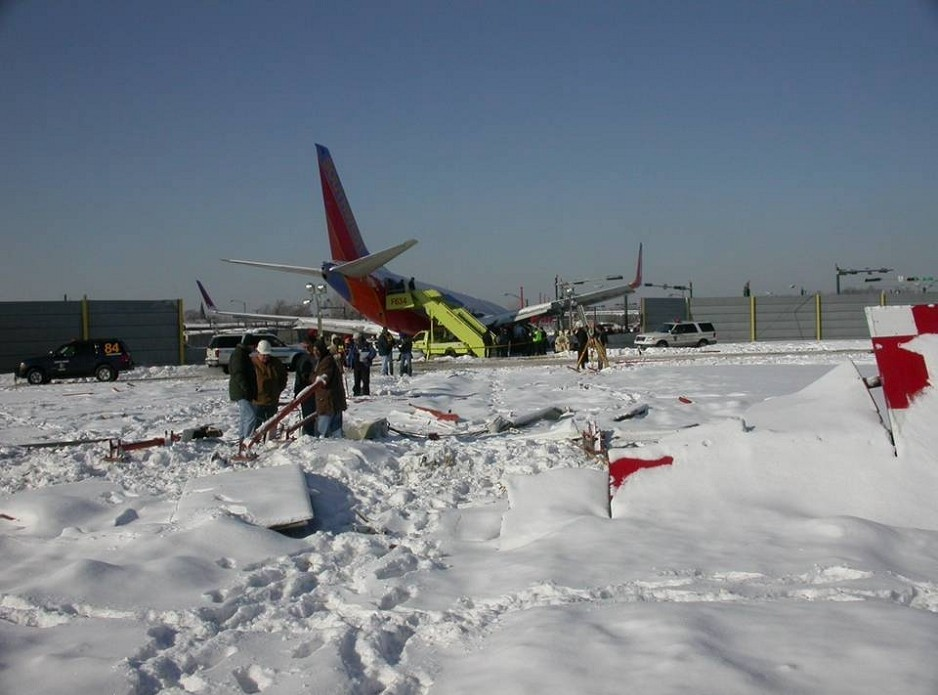
Another view of the accident

The aircraft involved was a one-year-old Boeing 737-7H4, with serial number 32471, originally registered as N471WN. It was built by Boeing Commercial Airplanes in 2004 and had logged 5273 airframe hours in 2901 takeoff and landing cycles. It was powered by two CFM International CFM56-7B24 turbofan engines. After repairs had been made, Southwest Airlines re-registered the aircraft to N286WN in September 2006.

=== Crew ===
In command was 59-year-old Captain Bruce Sutherland, who had been a U.S. Air Force pilot from 1969 to 1995. He joined Southwest Airlines in August 1995 and had logged 15,000 flight hours, including 4,500 hours on the Boeing 737. The first officer was 34-year-old Steven Oliver, who had been working for the airline since February 2003, having previously served as a captain for Mesaba Airlines from 1997 to 2003. The first officer had 8,500 flight hours (with 4,000 of them as a captain), with 2,000 of them on the Boeing 737. Neither pilot had been involved in any accident or incident before Flight 1248.

Captain Sutherland was the pilot flying (PF) and First Officer Oliver was the pilot monitoring (PM).

== Accident ==
On Thursday, December 8, 2005, Southwest Airlines Flight 1248 was scheduled to arrive at Chicago Midway International Airport from Baltimore-Washington International Thurgood Marshall Airport, and then continue to Salt Lake City International Airport, then to Las Vegas McCarran International Airport. The plane circled over a small area in northwest Indiana several times before attempting to land in a snowstorm that had reduced visibility to less than 1 mile (1.6 km).

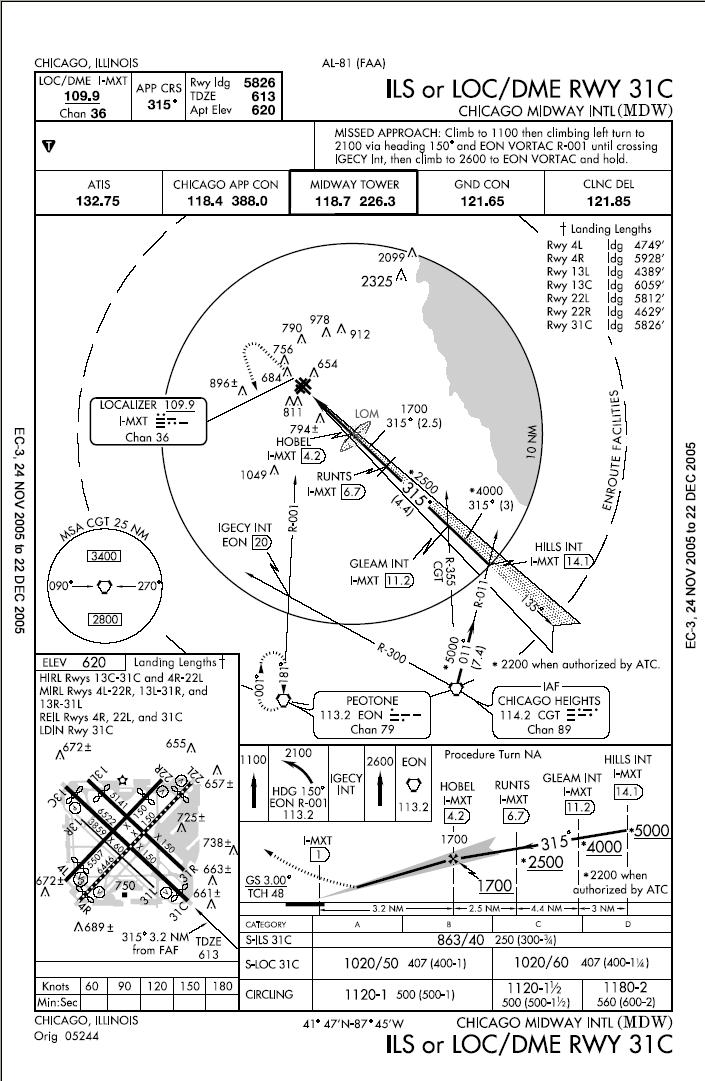
ILS Runway 31C chart for Chicago Midway International Airport, where the accident occurred.

At around 7:15 p.m. CST, the pilot attempted a landing with nearly 8 inches (20 cm) of snow on the ground in the area. Airport officials stated that the runway was clear of snow before the landing. The latest reported weather had the wind from between east and east-southeast (090°) at 11 knots (13 mph; 20 km/h).

A southeasterly wind would normally favor landing into the wind on Runway 13 Center. The runway visual range was reported at 4,500 feet (1,400 m), below the landing minimums for the instrument landing system approach to Runway 13C. The only available runway with lower minimums was the opposite direction on 31C, which the crew selected, with the aircraft's groundspeed consequentially boosted by the tailwind.

The Boeing 737 skidded during landing and, according to witnesses, the nosegear collapsed. The aircraft came to rest on Central Avenue just south of the 55th Street intersection at the northwestern corner of the airport. The intersection was full of traffic, and the airplane hit at least three cars, killing six-year-old Joshua Woods, critically injuring five occupants of one car (two adults and three children), and seriously injuring four occupants of a second car. All were quickly taken to area hospitals. Three passengers from the aircraft were taken to hospitals with minor injuries. A total of 12 people were taken to hospitals after the accident. One other car that was hit was parked and unoccupied.

== CVR transcript ==
Transcript of Southwest flight 1248's CVR (Times are expressed in CST)
* = Unintelligible word; () = Questionable text; (()) = Commentary; — = Break in continuity; Shading = Radio communication; ## = Expletive
Time	Source	Content
19:10:54	Captain	Before landing checklist
19:10:54	MDW Tower (to G3FK)	If unable just let me know and go to the end
19:10:56	First Officer	Speedbreak
19:10:56	G3FK (to MDW Tower)	Yea, we can make a left on Alpha.
19:10:57	Captain	Armed green light
19:10:58	First Officer	Landing gear
19:10:59	Captain	Down three green
19:10:59	First Officer	Flaps
19:11:00	Captain	Forty green light
19:11:01	First Officer	Before landing checks complete
19:11:03	Captain	Thank you
19:11:04	First Officer	No landing clearance yet
19:11:05	Captain	Nope
19:11:16	Captain	I got (a) A three just disregard the ah.. approach warning if we get one
19:11:20	First Officer	got it
19:11:31	Captain	Kay'
19:11:34	First Officer	Comin' over 'HOBEL' at seventeen
19:11:37	Captain	Alright and a thousand feet one thirty six, sink is a[n] nine hundred
19:11:42	First Officer	You can see the ground already
19:11:43	Captain	(yea) * (good)
19:11:44	First Officer	(one)
19:11:46	Captain	No peaking
19:11:47	First Officer	We're almost up to a thousand feet.
19:11:50	First Officer	Now we're at a thousand
19:11:51	Captain	Alright yea you're right thousand feet. One thirty two sink is ah eight-fifty
19:11:53	First Officer	I always
19:11:57	((Sound of autopilot disconnect warning))	
19:12:00	Captain	We're all counting on you.
19:12:01	First Officer	Uhmhmm
19:12:02	((Sound of laughter))	
19:12:07	((Sound of two clicks))	
19:12:16	Captain	Never auto-braked here huh?
19:12:18	First Officer	Yeah, hang on tight ((Sound of laughter))
19:12:21	Captain	Yeah
19:12:25	First Officer	five hundred.
19:12:26	Captain 1248 (to MDW Tower)	landing clearance for Southwest twelve-forty-eight
19:12:28	MDW Tower (to SWA1248)	Southwest twelve-forty-eight, runway three-one center cleared to land wind zero-nine-zero at nine brakin' action is fair to poor
19:12:35	First Officer	Four hundred
19:12:36	Captain	Alright
19:12:37	First Officer	Five green lights, cleared to land.
19:12:42	First Officer	Approaching minimums
19:12:42	Captain	Going outside the landing sir
19:12:45	First Officer	Alright
19:12:46	((Sound of thump))	
19:12:47	Captain	Might help
19:12:49	First Officer	##, a touch high on the glideslope
19:12:50	((Sound of two thumps))	
19:12:56	First Officer	One hundred
19:13:01	First Officer	Fifty, thirty, ten
19:13:02	((Sound of click))	
19:13:07	((Sound of click and squeak))	
19:13:07	((Sound of aircraft touchdown))	
19:13:08	Captain	Oh baby, I guess it comes on.
19:13:11	Captain	Come on baby
19:13:13	First Officer	About two thousand feet to go.
19:13:14	Captain	Feel it
19:13:13	First Officer	About two thousand feet to go.
19:13:15	First Officer	You jumping on the--
19:13:16	Captain	Son of a ###
19:13:17	First Officer	Jump on the brakes are ya?
19:13:18	Captain	Ah huh
19:13:19	First Officer	I'm ahnna
19:13:21	First Officer	Whaddya
19:13:22	Captain	###!
19:13:23	((Sound of double clunk))	
19:13:23	Captain	Get back there
19:13:25	Captain	We ain't goin' man
19:13:27	First Officer	We're ###
19:13:28	Captain	We are ###
19:13:30	Captain	Alight, keep it straight
19:13:31	((Sound of increased engine noise))	
19:13:35	First Officer	###
19:13:14	Captain	### hang on
19:13:35	First Officer	Hang on
19:13:36	((Sound of first impact))	
19:13:37	First Officer	###!
19:13:39	((Sound of Final impact))	
19:13:39	First Officer	Oh ###
19:13:42	First Officer	(Sound of groan)
19:13:43	Captain	(Sound of grunt) ### me.
19:13:46	First Officer	###
19:13:47	Captain	###
19:13:47	MDW Tower (to SWA1248)	What was that? Southwest twelve-forty-eight are you cleared three-one center?
19:13:48	((Sound of Stick shaker))	
19:13:49	((Sound of chime))	
19:13:51	((Sound of clunk))	
19:13:51	First officer 1248 (to MDW Tower)	Southwest twelve-forty-eight went over the end
19:13:53	MDW Tower (to SWA1248)	Say again
19:13:54	First officer 1248 (to MDW Tower)	we went off the end of the runway.
19:13:54	Captain	Shut down
19:13:58	First Officer	###
19:14:00	Captain	Shuttin' down
((End of recording))

== Investigation ==
The National Transportation Safety Board (NTSB) investigated the accident. Chicago Fire Department commissioner Cortez Trotter said that the aircraft would not be removed from the intersection until the NTSB gave clearance to do so following its on-site investigation. The nose of the aircraft was hoisted onto a flatbed tractor-trailer on Saturday, December 10, and the 737 was towed to a hangar for continued inspection.

The Boeing 737-7H4 was equipped with the latest anti-skid and braking technology. The report noted that Southwest had only very recently begun using the autobrake systems, and that pilot training on proper use of autobrakes had been inadequate.

The NTSB preliminary report determined that the aircraft touched down in the touchdown zone of the runway with 4,500 feet (1,400 m) of its 6,522-foot (1,988 m) length remaining; under the prevailing conditions of weather, wind, speed, and weight, the aircraft needed 5,300 feet (1,600 m) of runway to stop safely. It was found that the tailwind was eight knots and exceeded the limit of five knots.

A preliminary NTSB advisory said:

The flying pilot (Captain) stated that he could not get the reverse thrust levers out of the stowed position. The first officer, after several seconds, noticed that the thrust reversers were not deployed, and activated the reversers without a problem. Flight data recorder information reveals that the thrust reversers were not deployed until 18 seconds after touchdown, at which point there was only about 1,000 feet (300 m) of usable runway remaining.

Alternately, the crew could have held in the air, waiting for the weather to improve, or they could have diverted to another airport such as Chicago O'Hare International, which had substantially longer runways just 10 minutes away. Each of these options would have entailed considerable additional expense for Southwest, as well as missed connections and significant inconvenience for the flight's passengers. The NTSB identified the psychological pressure to complete their assigned task as one of the factors contributing to the crew's decision to land at Midway despite unfavorable conditions. Cockpit voice-recorder transcripts indicate that the pilots had been concerned about the weather and, before landing, jokingly alluded to the movie Airplane!, saying, "I picked a bad day to stop sniffin' glue."

The NTSB discovered that the air traffic controller had told the pilots that the braking action for the first half of the runway was good, and poor for the second half. However, investigators found that the controller had not furnished the pilots with all of the available required braking action reports because he did not take the type of aircraft from each report into account. One of these planes was a small plane that reported poor braking conditions. It was found that braking-action reports varied significantly based on aircraft type, changing weather conditions, personnel experience, the type of equipment used, and the time of report, and therefore should not be used as conclusive information on runway conditions.

The pilots stated that, based on the calculations that the crew had entered into the on-board performance computer (OPC), they believed that they could land and stop safely. However, investigators determined that the OPC had based its stopping margins on two assumptions: that the tailwind would be slower than it turned out to be and that the thrust reversers would be deployed when landing. It was found that the pilots had been unaware of these assumptions and that Southwest had not provided sufficient recurrent training on them. Therefore, the pilots did not use the critical braking-action term "poor" when assessing the landing performance.

Southwest Airlines had a policy that required pilots to consider more critical braking-action assessments when they receive mixed braking-action reports. However, the accident pilots were unaware of the policy and therefore did not consider it while assessing landing conditions. The NTSB also found that three other company pilots had landed before the accident with the same mixed braking-action reports. When interviewed, company pilots revealed that they too either did not adhere to the mixed braking policy or were not aware of it. Southwest also had not routinely trained its pilots on following or understanding the mixed braking-action report policy, and it was not referenced in the company manuals.

The NTSB concluded that even under the poor braking conditions and the tailwind, the plane could have stopped in time had the pilots deployed the thrust reversers on time. Examination of the reverser system found no evidence of malfunction. The NTSB determined that the probable cause was the pilots' failure to use available reverse thrust promptly to safely decelerate or stop after landing, which resulted in a runway overrun. This failure occurred because the pilots' first experience and lack of familiarity with the airplane's autobrake system distracted them from thrust-reverser usage during the challenging landing.

Contributing to the accident were Southwest Airlines' 1) failure to provide its pilots with clear and consistent guidance and training regarding company policies and procedures related to arrival landing distance calculations; 2) programming and design of its on-board performance computer, which did not present critical assumption information despite inconsistent tailwind and reverse thrust assessment methods; 3) plan to implement new autobrake procedures without a familiarization period; and 4) failure to include a margin of safety in the arrival assessment to account for operational uncertainties. Contributing to the severity of the accident was the absence of an engineered materials arrestor system, which was needed because of the limited runway-safety area beyond the departure end of Runway 31C."

== Aftermath ==
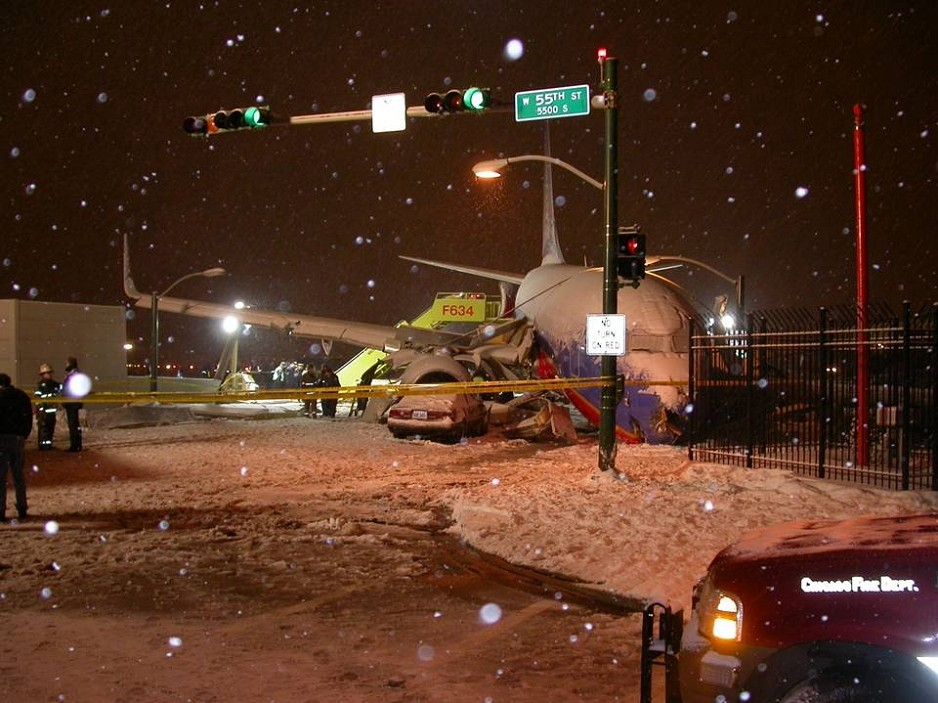
Another angle of the aftermath of Flight 1248

Presently, it is recommended practice for new runways to be constructed with a clear area at least 1,000 feet (300 m) long at each end, called a "runway safety area," to allow additional space for an aircraft that has overrun the runway to decelerate and stop in relative safety. As Midway was constructed before these rules had been enacted, it did not have this safety area at the time of the accident. The accident renewed debates on the need for, and feasibility of, an engineered materials arrestor system, or EMAS, at Chicago Midway, given the lack of adequate overrun areas and the surrounding residential neighborhoods. The city began acquiring land for a buffer zone around the airport after the crash occurred. In 2007, installation began on modified, short-length arrestor beds. One was completed at the end of Runway 31C by summer 2007. EMAS beds have also been installed at the end of Runways 04R, 13C, and 22L.

The accident occurred exactly 33 years after United Air Lines Flight 553, also a Boeing 737, crashed while approaching Midway Airport, killing 45.

This was the first Southwest Airlines accident in the 35-year history of the company to result in a fatality. The previous major incident was in 2000, when Southwest Airlines Flight 1455 overran a runway in Burbank, California, injuring 44 and narrowly avoiding a catastrophe; the aircraft ended up outside a Chevron gas station.

As a direct result of the accident, the U.S. Federal Aviation Administration created the Takeoff and Landing Performance Assessment Aviation Rulemaking Committee (TALPA ARC). In 2016, based on the recommendations of TALPA ARC, the FAA implemented a new numerical Runway Condition Code for communication of runway conditions between airport management to flight crew members.

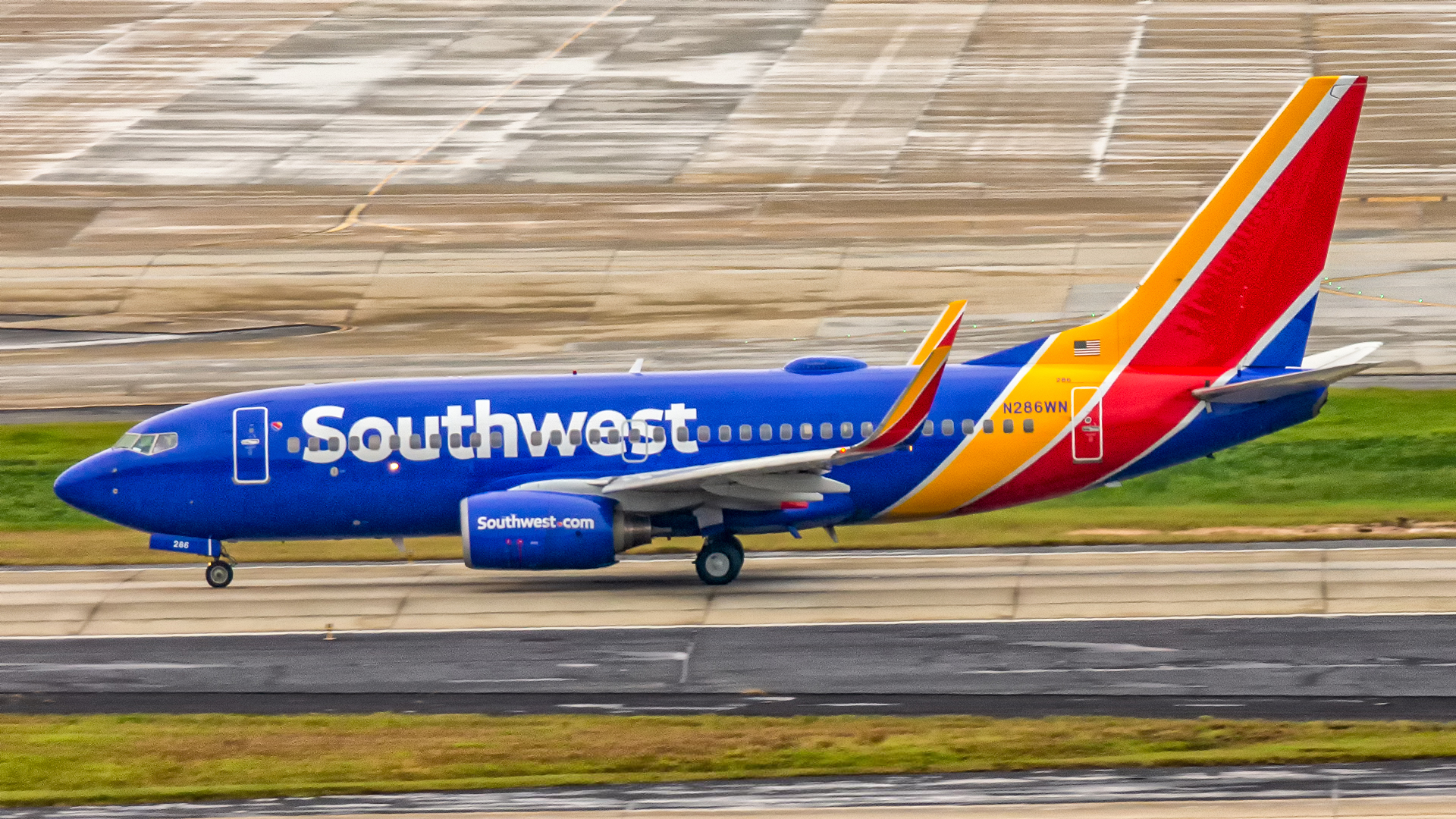
N286WN, now in Southwest's current livery, photographed in October 2021

Although the Midway accident killed a person on the ground rather than a passenger or crew member, Southwest followed the tradition of retiring any flight number involved in a fatal crash; flights from Baltimore to Chicago departing at or around 3:55 p.m. were designated Flight 1885 until that flight number was moved to a different flight. Southwest also petitioned the FAA in July 2006 to have the tail number of the aircraft changed to N286WN. After a lengthy repair, the aircraft emerged from Southwest's Midway hangar as N286WN in September 2006.

== See also ==
- Runway excursion
- Aviation accidents and incidents
- Engineered materials arrestor system
- Ground effect (aerodynamics)
- Runway safety area

=== Events at Midway ===
- United Air Lines Flight 553 – December 8, 1972

=== Runway overshoots ===
- TAP Flight 425 – November 19, 1977
- Lufthansa Flight 2904 – September 14, 1993
- Korean Air Flight 2033 – August 10th, 1994
- Philippine Airlines Flight 137 – March 22, 1998
- American Airlines Flight 1420 – June 1, 1999
- Southwest Airlines Flight 1455 - March 5, 2000

== Sources ==
=== References ===
- "Boy killed after plane skids off runway". CNN. December 8, 2005.
- "Boy Killed After Plane Skids Off Runway". Associated Press. December 8, 2005.
- "Southwest Airlines Unaccompanied Minors". Airlines Policy.
- "Boy dies as jet skids off runway". BBC News. December 8, 2005.
- "NTSB urges pilots to change landing distance calculations". CNN. December 7, 2006.
- "NTSB UPDATE ON SOUTHWEST AIRLINES RUNWAY OVERRUN AT MIDWAY AIRPORT" (Press release). National Transportation Safety Board. December 15, 2005. Archived from the original on December 17, 2005.
