= Safety area =

Safety area may refer to:

- Safety area (shooting) - in practical shooting, a bay where shooters can handle and holster unloaded firearms
- Runway safety area - surface surrounding runway in case of an aircraft departing the runway
