= Arrester =

Arrester may refer to:

- Lightning arrester
- Arrestor bed (disambiguation)
- Surge arrester
