= Southwest Airlines Flight 1455 =

2000 aviation accident in California

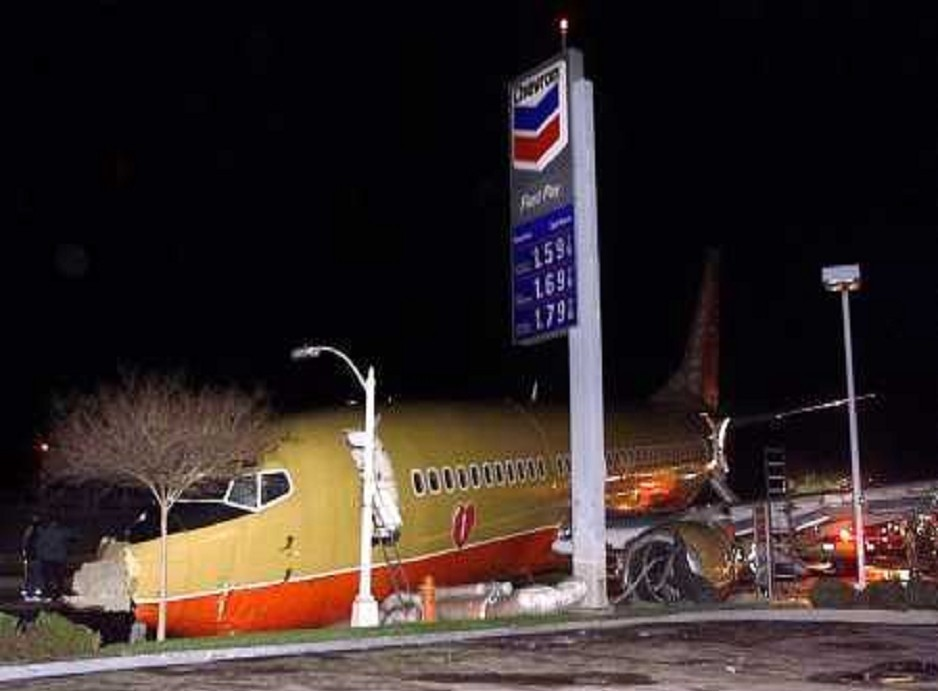
- The aircraft after overrunning the runway at Burbank–Glendale–Pasadena Airport

Accident
- Date: March 5, 2000
- Summary: Runway overrun due to pilot error and ATC error
- Site: Burbank–Glendale–Pasadena Airport, Burbank, California, United States; 34°11′50″N 118°20′56″W

Aircraft
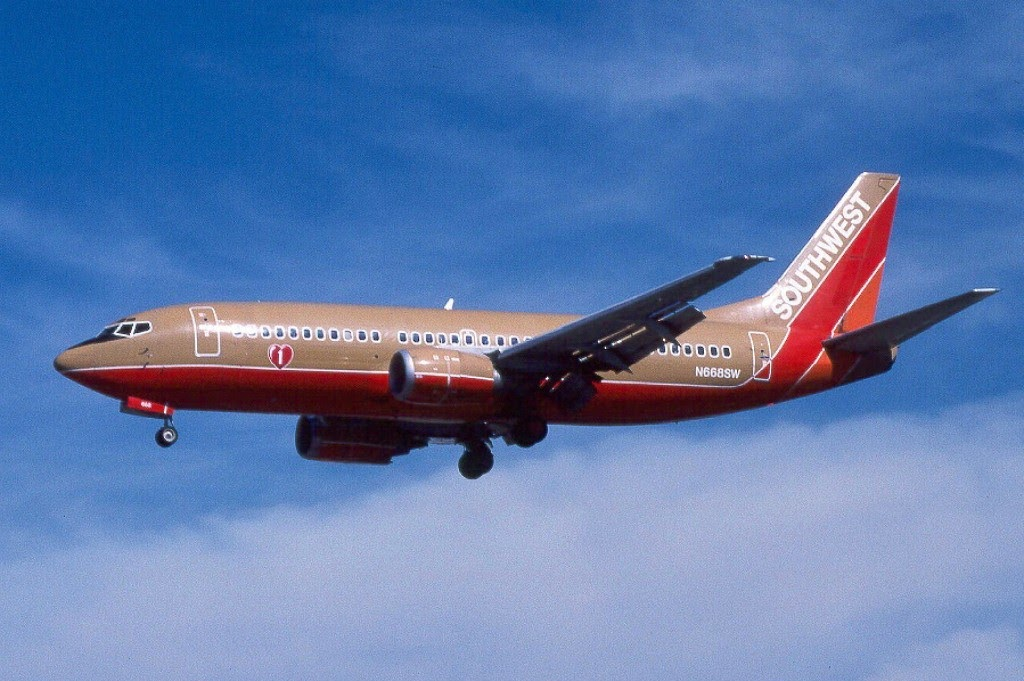
- N668SW, the aircraft involved in the accident, seen in 1999
- Aircraft type: Boeing 737-3T5
- Operator: Southwest Airlines
- IATA flight No.: WN1455
- ICAO flight No.: SWA1455
- Call sign: SOUTHWEST 1455
- Registration: N668SW
- Flight origin: McCarran International Airport, Las Vegas, Nevada, U.S.
- Destination: Burbank-Glendale-Pasadena Airport, Burbank, California, U.S.
- Occupants: 142
- Passengers: 137
- Crew: 5
- Fatalities: 0
- Injuries: 44
- Survivors: 142

Southwest Airlines Flight 1455 was a scheduled passenger flight from McCarran International Airport, Las Vegas, Nevada, to Burbank-Glendale-Pasadena Airport, Burbank, California, that overran the runway during landing on March 5, 2000. The aircraft, a Boeing 737–300, registration N668SW, came to rest on a city street adjacent to a Chevron gas station. The National Transportation Safety Board found that the accident was due to the pilots attempting to land with excessive speed. They also found that the air traffic controller placed them in a position from which their only option was a go around. Two of the passengers were seriously injured, and there were many minor injuries. As a result of the accident, the airport installed an engineered materials arrestor system at the east end of the incident runway. The aircraft was written off, making the incident the 10th hull loss of a Boeing 737–300. This was the first major accident in the airline's 29-year history.

== Aircraft and crew ==
The aircraft was a 15 year old Boeing 737-3T5 registered as N668SW. It was one of the oldest aircraft in Southwest's fleet, having been originally built for Orion Airways in 1984. The aircraft was powered by two CFM International CFM56-3B1 turbofan engines.

The captain was 52-year-old Howard Peterson, who had been with Southwest Airlines since 1988 and had logged 11,000 flight hours, including 9,870 hours on the Boeing 737. Peterson had served as a pilot in the United States Air Force from 1969 to 1975, when he began flying for United Airlines from 1975 to 1977, and subsequently with Wien Air Alaska from 1977 to 1979, as well as for Coleman Air Transport from 1979 to 1980, before flying for EG&G from 1980 to 1988.

The first officer was 43-year-old Jeffrey D. Erwin, who had been with Southwest Airlines since 1995 and had 5,032 flight hours, with 2,522 of them on the Boeing 737. Erwin had also served as a pilot in the United States Air Force from 1983 to 1995.

== Accident ==
Flight 1455 departed McCarran International Airport (now Harry Reid International Airport) (LAS), Las Vegas, Nevada, at 16:50, more than 2 hours behind schedule due to inclement weather in the area. At 18:04:02, when the aircraft was 19 nautical miles (22 mi; 35 km) north of the BUR outer marker, the SoCal approach controller instructed the aircraft to maintain 230 knots (260 mph; 430 km/h) or greater until further notice. The controller later instructed the captain to place the aircraft into the approach pattern between two other flights. The captain acknowledged the instructions.

At 18:04:42 the first officer informed the captain that the target airspeed for landing would be 138 knots (159 mph; 256 km/h). This value was based on standard procedures in the Southwest Airlines Flight Operations Manual (FOM). At 18:05:13 the captain told the first officer that the air traffic controller had instructed them to remain at 230 knots (260 mph; 430 km/h) or greater "for a while".

At 18:05:54 the controller cleared Flight 1455 to descend to 5,000 feet (1,500 m), and at 18:07 cleared the flight to descend to 3,000 feet (900 m). At 18:08 the controller cleared flight 1455 for a visual approach to runway 8 with a restriction to remain at or above 3,000 feet (above mean sea level) until passing the Van Nuys VOR beacon. This navigational aid is approximately 6 miles (5 nmi; 10 km) from the runway. Radar data suggest that the flight began its descent from 3,000 feet (910 m) about 4 miles (3 nmi; 6 km) from the runway.

According to the Aeronautical Information Manual Section 4-4-12f, this approach clearance automatically canceled any previous speed assignments. According to the final accident report, traffic conditions no longer warranted the speed assignment after the controller cleared the flight to descend to 3,000 feet (910 m), but the controller did not verbally cancel the speed assignment.

Southwest Airlines procedures then in place had the non-flying pilot (pilot monitoring) make altitude call-outs at 1000, 500, 400, 300, 200, 100, 50, 30, and 10 feet (3.0 m). Additionally, call-outs are required if certain parameters are not met, in this case flight speed and sink rate. At 18:09:32, one minute and thirteen seconds after approach clearance was given, and at 3,000 feet (910 m) of altitude, the captain began to slow the aircraft by deploying the flaps.

At 18:10:24 the ground proximity warning system (GPWS) began to sound a "sink rate" warning in the cockpit. The aircraft was descending at an angle of 7 degrees, when the angle of descent for most aircraft landing on that runway was 3 or 4 degrees. Both pilots ignored the warnings. At 18:10:44 the warning system in the cockpit began to sound. The captain responded to these warnings with "that's all right".

The captain stated after the accident that he knew as the aircraft passed 500 feet (150 m) that he was not "in the slot", meaning the conditions had not been met for a safe landing, in this case because of an excessive airspeed. The captain further stated that he understood that, if he were not "in the slot", procedures demanded a go-around maneuver to abort the landing. He could not explain why he did not perform a go-around maneuver. The first officer likewise indicated after the accident that he was aware that they were not "in the slot", but said he believed the captain was taking corrective action.

The aircraft touched down on the wet runway at approximately 182 knots, 44 knots (51 mph; 81 km/h) over the target airspeed. Furthermore, it touched down 2,150 feet (660 m) from the runway threshold, 650 feet (200 m) beyond the 1,000–1,500-foot (300–460 m) range established by the Southwest Airlines FOM. The captain deployed the thrust reversers and then he and the first officer applied manual brakes, but according to later NTSB findings, under those conditions even maximum braking would not have prevented the aircraft from overrunning the end of the runway.

Unable to stop in time, the Boeing 737 overran the end of Runway 8. "The airplane touched down at approximately 182 knots (209 mph; 337 km/h), and about 20 seconds later, at approximately 32 knots (37 mph; 59 km/h), collided with a metal blast fence and an airport perimeter wall." It finally came to rest on Hollywood Way, a four-lane city street, near a Chevron gas station. The tip of the aircraft's nose and its front landing gear were sheared off, but otherwise the fuselage remained intact and there was no compromise of the cabin area. However, the 737 sustained structural damage from the accident and was later scrapped.

The cockpit voice recorder captured the flight's captain remarking, "Well, there goes my career," moments after the accident.

== Investigation ==
The NTSB concluded that the probable cause for the accident was excessive flight speed and the steep angle of the glidepath (7 degrees, as opposed to the 3 degrees normally used for both visual and instrument approaches), and the flight crew's failure to abort the approach when conditions were not met for a stable approach and landing. The action of the flight controller was listed as a contributing factor in the accident: "Contributing to the accident was the controller's positioning of the airplane in such a manner as to leave no safe options for the flight crew other than a go-around maneuver."

Months later, the pilots were fired as a result of this incident. Southwest Airlines admitted the pilots' actions were negligent.

At the time, a Southwest spokesperson termed it "the worst accident" in the airline's history. Air safety experts and pilots suggested the accident was an example of a situation where "fast, steep, unstabilized approaches" are dangerous, and of how inadequate the safety margins around the Burbank runways are (as well as similar U.S. airports).

The gas station missed by the aircraft was later closed and demolished due to safety concerns. The lot became dedicated green space.

== Injuries ==
Of the 142 people on board, 2 passengers sustained serious injuries; 41 passengers and the captain sustained minor injuries; and 94 passengers, 3 flight attendants, and the first officer sustained no injuries. However, there were 67 people nearby. The airplane sustained extensive exterior damage and some internal damage to the passenger cabin.

The 737 struck a vehicle on Hollywood Way, pinning the vehicle's hood under the aircraft. However, the vehicle's two occupants (the driver and her four-year-old daughter) were not injured. No other ground injuries were reported.

During the accident sequence, the forward service door (1R) escape slide inflated inside the airplane; the nose gear collapsed; and the forward dual flight attendant jumpseat, which was occupied by two flight attendants, partially collapsed.

The inflated escape slide blocked both forward doors from being used to evacuate the aircraft, and prevented two flight attendants seated on the forward jumpseat from assisting the evacuation. There was no fire, but had there been a fire, this malfunctioning slide would have dramatically affected the survivability of the occupants. As a result of this occurrence, the NTSB issued a safety recommendation to replace the slide cover latch brackets on forward slide compartments of all older Boeing 737 models with the latch brackets installed on later models.

== Subsequent safety measures ==
As with runway 4R/22L at the Little Rock National Airport, site of the American Airlines Flight 1420 overrun accident, runway 8/26 in Burbank was exempt from the 1,000-foot (300 m) runway safety area standard. The NTSB cited this accident in a recommendation for installing the engineered materials arrestor system (EMAS) at airports where it is not feasible to establish the 1,000-foot (300 m) runway safety area (RSA). A US $4,000,000 EMAS was subsequently installed as a result of this accident at Burbank airport.

On Friday, October 13, 2006, the Burbank EMAS stopped a private jet with no injuries or aircraft damage.

On December 6, 2018, it stopped a Southwest 737-700 (N752SW), with 117 people on board. There were no injuries and no damage to the aircraft.

== Dispute with city of Burbank ==
Burbank city officials demanded that Southwest Airlines pay the city $40,000 (equivalent to $74,800 in 2025) for services related to the accident, including overtime for police officers and firefighters. Southwest refused to pay, stating that the airline is entitled to emergency services since it pays taxes to the city.

== See also ==
- Engineered materials arrestor system
- Ground effect (aerodynamics)
- Runway safety area
- Southwest Airlines Flight 1248 — Chicago Midway International Airport overrun accident on December 8, 2005.
- TAM Airlines Flight 3054 — A similar runway overrun crash that occurred 7 years later where an Airbus A320 landed on a wet runway and hit a gas station, killing all 187 onboard and 12 on the ground.
