= Hollywood Airport =

Hollywood Airport may refer to:

- Hollywood Burbank Airport, in California, United States
- Fort Lauderdale–Hollywood International Airport, in Florida, United States
