= Arrestor bed =

An arrestor bed or arrester bed is an area of special material designed to stop a runaway vehicle. Arrestor beds include:

- Engineered materials arrestor system, crushable concrete used to stop aircraft which overrun a runway
- Runaway truck ramps on highways
- Railway safety sidings
