= Burbank–Glendale–Pasadena Airport Authority Police =

Coordinates: 34.195342°N 118.353285°W

- Abbreviation: BGPAA PD

Jurisdictional structure
- Operations jurisdiction: US
- Legal jurisdiction: Hollywood Burbank Airport
- General nature: Local civilian police

Operational structure
- Headquarters: Hollywood Burbank Airport, Burbank, California
- Police Officers: 34
- Agency executive: Edward B. Skvarna, Chief of Police
- Parent agency: Burbank Glendale Pasadena Airport Authority

Website
- BGPAA Police

The Burbank–Glendale–Pasadena Airport Authority Police (BGPAA PD) is a law enforcement agency with responsibility for security and police functions at Hollywood Burbank Airport. It is an arm of the Bob Hope Airport, which represents the three cities that own the airport (Burbank, Glendale and Pasadena).

Despite proximity to Los Angeles and Van Nuys airports, the BGPAA PD is an independent agency and is not affiliated with the Los Angeles Airport Police, other than for liaison purposes. It is also separate from the police departments of the cities that own the airport.

Airport Police officers are peace officers under California law and have authority anywhere in the state. Authorized strength is 34 sworn officers. The chief of police is Edward B. Skvarna.

BGPAA PD arrested Snoop Dogg at the airport in 2006.
