= Hollywood Burbank Airport =

Airport serving the northern Greater Los Angeles area, California

Hollywood Burbank Airport Bob Hope Airport

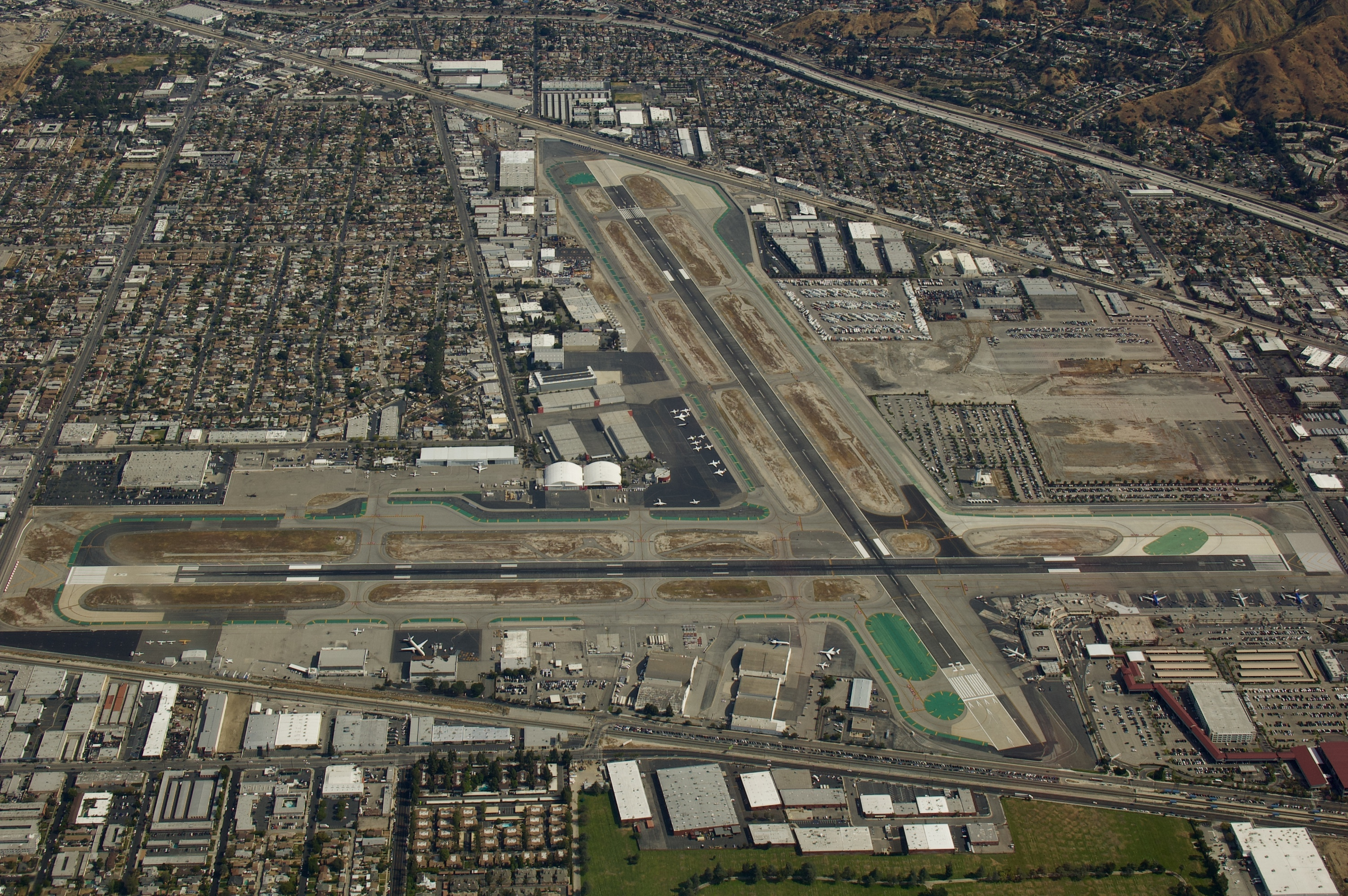
- Hollywood Burbank Airport, looking north, May 2018
- IATA: BUR; ICAO: KBUR; FAA LID: BUR; WMO: 72288

Summary
- Airport type: Public
- Owner/Operator: Burbank–Glendale–Pasadena Airport Authority
- Serves: Northern Greater Los Angeles area
- Location: Burbank, California, U.S.
- Opened: May 30, 1930; 96 years ago
- Operating base for: Ameriflight; JSX
- Elevation AMSL: 778 ft (237 m)
- Coordinates: 34°12′02″N 118°21′31″W
- Public transit access: Burbank Airport–South
- Website: www.hollywoodburbankairport.com

Maps
- FAA airport diagram as of 2026
- Location within the Los Angeles metropolitan area Location within California Location within the United States
- Interactive map of Hollywood Burbank Airport; Bob Hope Airport

Runways
Direction	Length		Surface
Direction	ft	m	Surface
15/33	6,886	2,099	Asphalt
08/26	5,802	1,768	Asphalt

Statistics (2025)
- Total passengers: 6,219,479 ▼5.05%
- Aircraft operations: 133,845
- Cargo: 72,197,883 lb (32,748,409 kg)
- Source: Hollywood Burbank Airport

Hollywood Burbank Airport (Note: Formerly called Bob Hope Airport after entertainer Bob Hope) (IATA: BUR, ICAO: KBUR, FAA LID: BUR) is a public airport three miles (5 km) northwest of downtown Burbank, in Los Angeles County, California, United States. The airport serves Burbank, Hollywood, and the northern Greater Los Angeles area, which includes Glendale, Pasadena, the San Fernando Valley, and the Santa Clarita Valley. It is closer to many popular attractions, including Griffith Park, Universal Studios Hollywood, and Downtown Los Angeles, than Los Angeles International Airport (LAX), and it is the only airport in the area with a direct rail connection to Downtown Los Angeles, with service from two stations: Burbank Airport–North and Burbank Airport–South. Nonstop flights mostly serve cities in the western United States, though the airport also features regular flights to Atlanta, Honolulu, and Indianapolis as well as seasonal flights to New York (JFK).

Originally, the entire airport was within the Burbank city limits, but the north end of Runway 15/33 has been extended into the city of Los Angeles. The airport is owned by the Burbank–Glendale–Pasadena Airport Authority and controlled by the governments of those cities. The Airport Authority contracts with TBI Airport Management, Inc., to operate the airport, which has its own police and fire departments, the Burbank–Glendale–Pasadena Airport Authority Police. They also share police helicopters registered N102CG and N103CG both based out of Burbank airport on the north-east end of the airport on taxiway Bravo. Boarding uses air stairs instead of jet bridges. The Federal Aviation Administration (FAA) National Plan of Integrated Airport Systems for 2017–2021 categorized it as a medium-hub primary commercial service facility.

== History ==
The airport has been named United Airport (1930–1934), Union Air Terminal (1934–1940), Lockheed Air Terminal (1940–1967), Hollywood–Burbank Airport (1967–1978), Burbank–Glendale–Pasadena Airport (1978–2003), and Bob Hope Airport after comedian Bob Hope (since 2003 as the legal name). In 2017, it was rebranded as Hollywood Burbank Airport due to the lack of recognition of Bob Hope Airport's geographic region.

United Aircraft and Transport Corporation (UA&T) was a holding company created in 1928 that included Boeing Aircraft and United Air Lines, itself a holding company for a collection of small airlines that continued to operate under their own names. One of these airlines was Pacific Air Transport (PAT), which Boeing had acquired because of PAT's west coast mail contract in January 1928. UA&T sought a site for a new airport for PAT and found one in Burbank. UA&T had the benefit of surveys that the Aeronautics Department of the Los Angeles Chamber of Commerce had conducted starting in 1926 to identify potential airport sites.

It took UA&T a year and the cooperation of the city to assemble the site. The 234-acre (95 ha) site was rife with vines and trees and the ground had to be filled and leveled, but it had good drainage, a firm landing surface, steady winds, and good access to ground transport. Construction was completed in just seven months. In an age when few aircraft had brakes and many had a tail skid instead of a wheel, runways were not usually paved; those at Burbank had a 5-inch-thick (130 mm) mixture of oil and sand. There were no taxi strips, but the designers left room for them. Two of the runways were over 3,600 feet (1,100 m) long; a third was 2,900 feet (880 m); all were 300 feet (91 m) wide. These were generous dimensions, and the site had room for expansion.

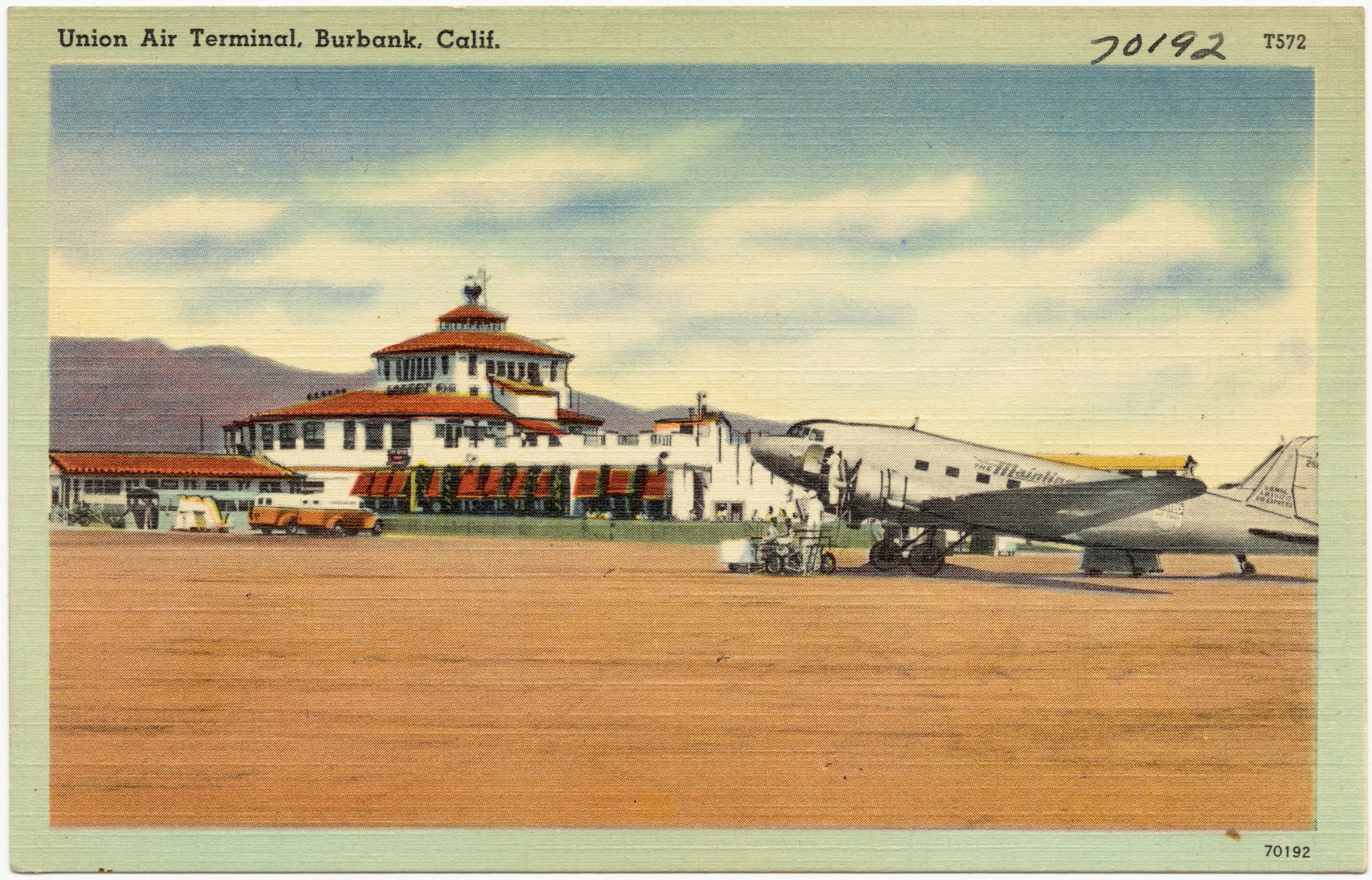
A postcard of what was then called Union Air Terminal (1934–1940)

United Airport was dedicated amid much festivity (including an air show) on Memorial Day weekend (May 30 – June 1), 1930. The airport and its handsome Spanish Revival-style terminal was a showy competitor to nearby Grand Central Airport in Glendale, which was then Los Angeles' main airline terminal. The new Burbank facility was actually the largest commercial airport in the Los Angeles area until it was eclipsed in 1946 by the Los Angeles Airport in Westchester when that facility (formerly Mines Field, then Los Angeles Municipal Airport) commenced scheduled airline operations.

The Burbank facility remained United Airport until 1934, when it was renamed Union Air Terminal. The name change came the same year that federal anti-trust actions caused United Aircraft and Transport to dissolve, which took effect September 26, 1934. The Union Air Terminal moniker stuck until Lockheed bought the airport in 1940 and renamed it Lockheed Air Terminal.

In March 1939, airlines scheduled sixteen departures a day out of Burbank: eight United Airlines, five Western Airlines and three TWA (American Airlines' three departures were still at Glendale). Airline flights continued even while Lockheed's extensive factories supplied the war effort and developed military and civil aircraft into the mid-1960s. The April 1957 OAG lists nine weekday departures on Western, six on United, six on Pacific Air Lines, one on TWA and one on American Airlines (a nonstop to Chicago Midway Airport). Pacific Southwest Airlines (PSA) had 48 Douglas DC-4 departures a week to SFO and SAN. PSA did not fly out of LAX until 1958.

In 1958, Transocean Air Lines Lockheed Constellations flew to Honolulu three times a week; twice a week a Constellation flew Oakland - Burbank - Chicago Midway Airport - New York Idlewild Airport (now JFK Airport) - Hartford. In summer 1962 PSA flights to San Francisco and San Diego were all Lockheed L-188 Electras, a total of 32 departures a week from Burbank.

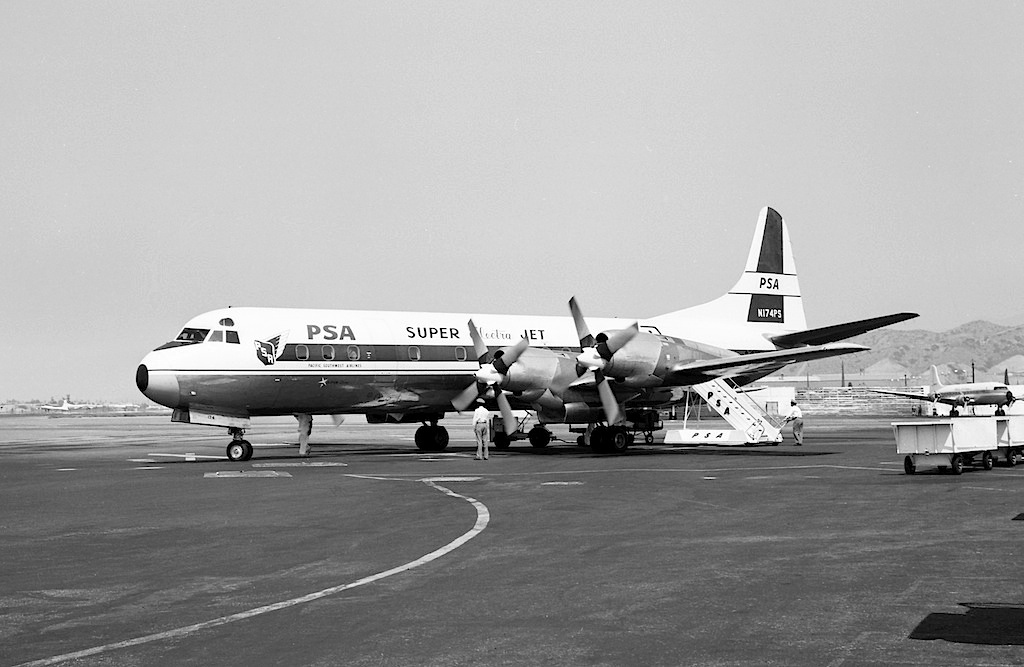
A PSA Electra, 1962

Jets arrived at Burbank in the late 1960s: Pacific Air Lines flew Boeing 727-100s nonstop to Las Vegas and San Francisco and one-stop to Eureka/Arcata. Pacific Southwest Airlines (PSA) flew 727s to the San Francisco Bay Area and San Diego. Hughes Airwest (previously Air West) flew Douglas DC-9-10s and McDonnell Douglas DC-9-30s nonstop to Las Vegas, Phoenix, Salt Lake City and Denver with one-stop DC-9s to Houston Hobby Airport.

Hughes Airwest even operated one-stop DC-9s to Grand Canyon National Park Airport near the south rim of the Grand Canyon. In 1986 United Airlines Boeing 767-200s flew nonstop to Chicago O'Hare Airport. The 767 was the largest passenger airliner ever to serve Burbank. AirCal McDonnell Douglas MD-80s flew nonstop to the Bay Area and direct to Lake Tahoe.

In 1967, Lockheed renamed the facility Hollywood–Burbank Airport. In 1970, Continental Airlines began Boeing 727-200 flights to Portland and Seattle via San Jose and also flew the short hop to Ontario. Continental later offered flights to Chicago via Ontario. Continental went on to serve Denver with nonstop Boeing 727-200s from BUR. Alaska Airlines began serving Burbank in 1981 with Boeing 727-100s and 727-200s flying nonstop and direct to Seattle and Portland, which was Alaska Air's first service to southern California. Aloha Airlines pioneered nonstop jet service from BUR to Hawaii, flying Boeing 737-700s to Honolulu before ending all passenger operations.

A 1973 decision by the United States Supreme Court in City of Burbank v. Lockheed Air Terminal, Inc. overturned an airport curfew imposed by the city of Burbank on flights between 11:00 pm and 7:00 am under the U.S. Constitution's Supremacy Clause on the grounds that airports were subject to federal oversight by the Federal Aviation Administration and under the terms of the Noise Control Act of 1972. The airport now has a strictly voluntary noise abatement procedure to reduce noise of aircraft arriving and departing from the airport. Commercial flights are scheduled between the hours of 7:00 am and 10:00 pm. Departing flights usually take off to the south on runway 15, and arriving flights usually land on Runway 8, winds permitting.

The facility remained Hollywood–Burbank Airport for more than a decade until 1978 when Lockheed sold it to the Burbank–Glendale–Pasadena Airport Authority. The airport then got its fifth name: Burbank–Glendale–Pasadena Airport (1978–2003). On November 6, 2003, the airport authority voted to change the name to Bob Hope Airport in honor of comedian Bob Hope, a longtime resident of nearby Toluca Lake, who had died earlier that year and who had kept his personal airplane at the airfield. The new name was unveiled on December 17, 2003, on the 100th anniversary of the Wright brothers' first flight in 1903, the year that Bob Hope was born.

After much debate between the Airport Authority, the city of Burbank, the Transportation Security Administration, and Burbank residents, in November 2007 it was decided that construction of a new $8 million to $10 million baggage screening facility for Terminal B is legal, considering the anti-growth limitations placed on the airport. The facility will house a $2.5-million explosive detection system, used for the automatic detection of explosives within checked luggage.

In June 2014, a $112 million Regional Transportation Center opened. The 520,000-square-foot (48,310-square-meter) center at Hollywood Way and Empire Avenue was also built to withstand a major earthquake while serving as an emergency "nerve center." The industrial-looking hub with a red steel roof will be adorned by 16, three-story art panels. Solar panels generating 1.5 megawatts of electricity will also be added to its roof. A nearby parking garage was built to handle more than 1,000 cars, while traffic lights have been reworked around the airport.

=== Flight path changes and related noise issues ===
Flight paths of aircraft departing Hollywood Burbank Airport changed as part of the Federal Aviation Administration's airspace modernization program called NextGen. An independent analysis confirmed in October 2018 that "a connection was found between the [NextGen] implementation and the increase in the number of flights over areas south of the 101 Freeway.". Patrick Lammerding, the airport's deputy executive director of planning and development, told The New York Times that in 2016, the airport received 577 complaints; a year after the flight path changes, in 2018, the number rose to 222,798; in the first half of 2019, complaints soared to 616,022.

Both the airport itself and third-party sources track noise complaints for the Hollywood Burbank Airport. In addition to the airport's systems (Webtrak), as of December 14, 2022, third party site Airnoise.io has received 3,540,332 noise complaints for the Hollywood Burbank Airport. While the airport's Webtrak website requires users to fill out a web page with all the details of each aircraft disturbance, when pressed while an aircraft is overhead, the Airnoise button and website will automatically file a complaint on the user's behalf.

While in-person meetings regarding noise issues have been held in large meeting spaces with hundreds of attendees, airport staff claims that approximately 90% of complaints are filed by 45 individuals. Such a claim is consistent with the airport's continued inaction to address these issues, despite repeated pleas for relief and solutions from local communities and elected officials from every level of government. In 2019 and 2020, the airport and various stakeholders participated in a Southern San Fernando Valley Airport Noise Task Force administered by aviation industry consultants that held meetings and presented 16 recommendations to the FAA in June 2020, to address the issue.

The FAA responded by letter in September 2020, that most of the recommendations were either "not operationally feasible" or "not technically feasible" and, as of July 29, 2022, has not implemented any solutions. On August 1, 2022, Hollywood Burbank Airport received $3 million for Infrastructure upgrades and $805,900 will go toward an Airport Noise Compatibility Planning study, including updating Noise Exposure Maps and identifying where the airport can undertake mitigation efforts, according to Schiff's office.

As part of the noise study, the airport is also establishing a 12-member Citizen's Advisory Committee, which will include a majority of representatives from non-impacted areas: 3 members respectively from the airport owner cities of Burbank, Glendale, and Pasadena (9 total), and 1 member, respectively, from each of Los Angeles Council Districts 2, 4, and 6 (3 total). After having taken almost four years to form the Citizens Advisory Committee, commissioners voted on March 18, 2024, to remove Los Angeles representatives from the citizen-run board.

=== Replacement terminal ===
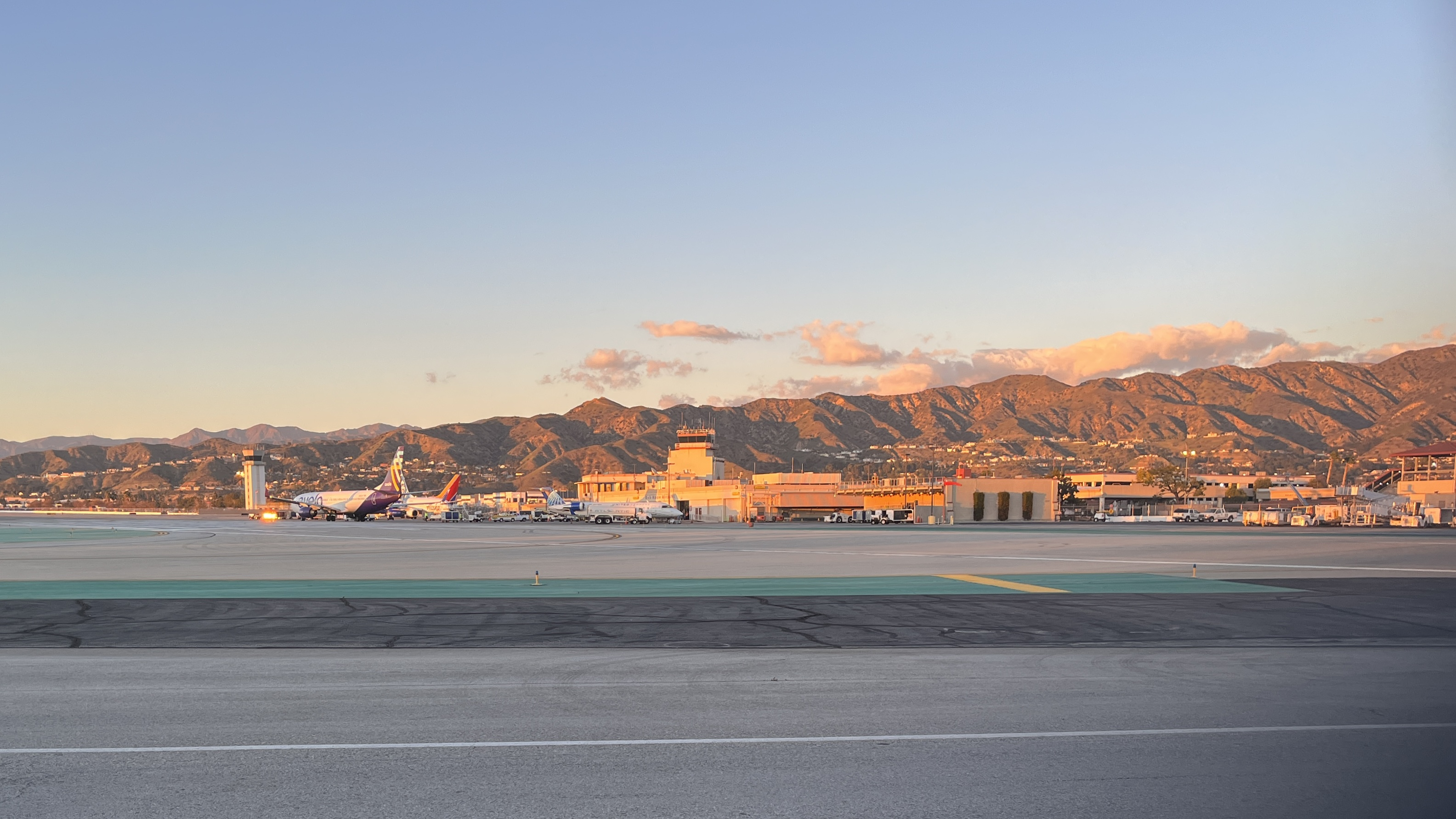
The airport in February 2022

Hollywood Burbank Airport completed a new terminal on the northeast corner of the airport. The new terminal is required to keep the same number of gates (14) but is significantly larger at 355,000 square feet (33,000 m^{2}) allowing for more restrooms, additional restaurant and concession space, improved security screening areas, and other enhanced passenger amenities.

The plan to develop a new airport terminal building was unveiled by the airport authority in 2013. The replacement terminal will meet newer seismic standards and be farther from the runway as required by the Federal Aviation Administration. The location is west of Hollywood Way on undeveloped property that has been used in recent years for parking. The Burbank City Council allowed voters to decide on the plan. Known as Measure B, the proposal went before Burbank city voters on November 8, 2016, and passed with 69% of voters approving.

The next step in the terminal replacement process was for the Airport Authority to finalize the new terminal's design, get FAA approval (NEPA clearance for which was obtained on Tuesday, May 18, 2021) and then secure the required financing from the FAA and other sources. Airport funding sources include FAA grants, parking fees, landing fees charged to airlines, as well as rents from restaurants and other concession businesses operating at the airport. There are also fees charged on airline tickets sold, including passenger facility charges and federal taxes. The airport selected the architectural firm Corgan to design the new terminal.

In July 2021, the City of Los Angeles filed a lawsuit against the FAA alleging deficiencies in the environmental review process for the proposed replacement passenger terminal at the Hollywood Burbank Airport.

On January 25, 2024, officials held a groundbreaking ceremony for the replacement terminal, with the terminal opening on October 13, 2026. The project cost $1.3 billion.

=== Proposed California High Speed Rail connection ===
The California High-Speed Rail Authority plans to have tracks running through and beneath the airport's property, with a new underground station to be built adjacent to the proposed replacement passenger terminal. In 2022, the airport used the California Environmental Quality Act to file a lawsuit to block approval for California High-Speed Rail construction. The lawsuit was dropped in 2023 after an agreement was reached between the high-speed rail and airport authorities.

== Facilities ==
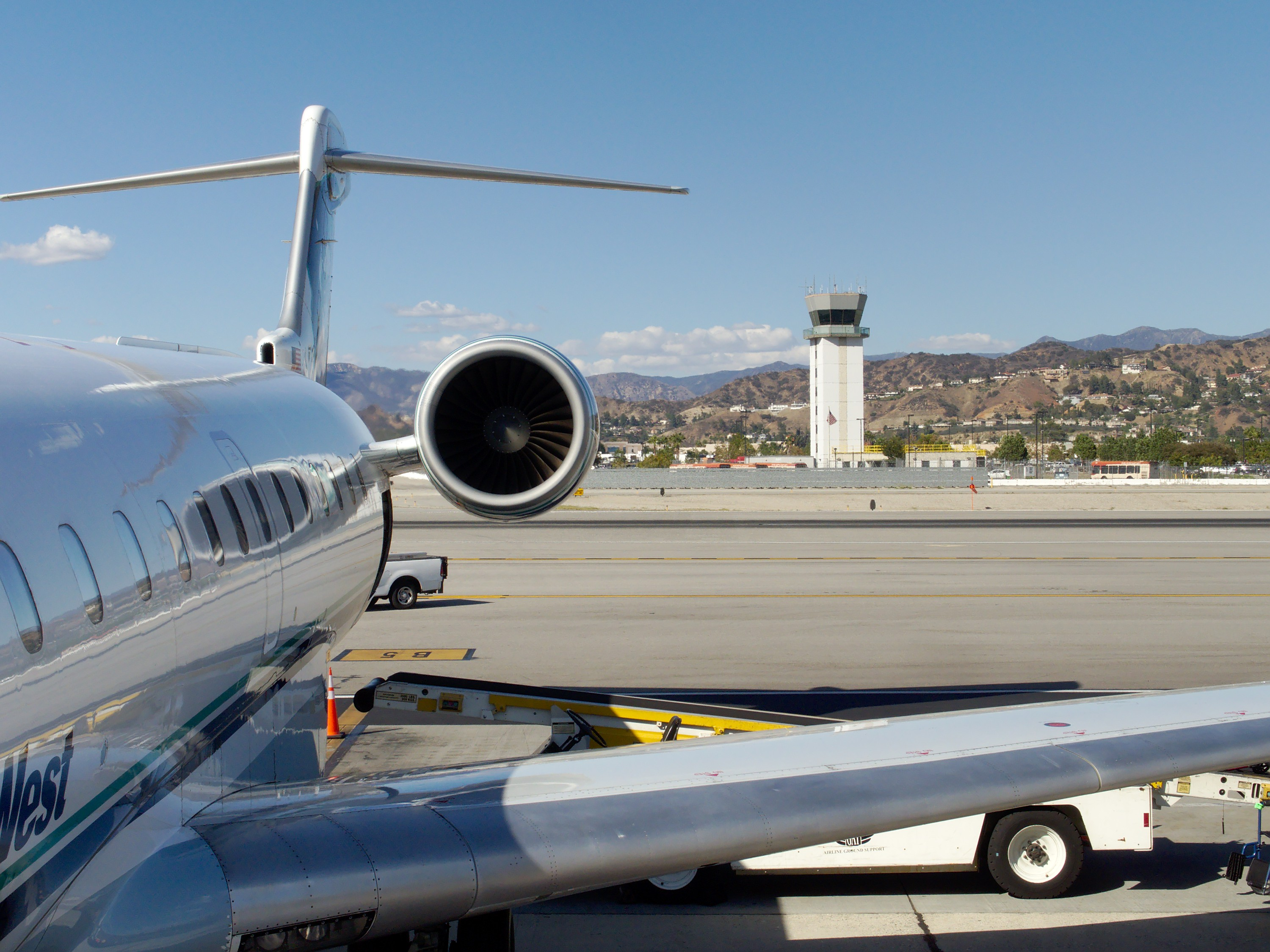
The tower seen from an airplane boarding ramp, 2015

Hollywood Burbank Airport covers 555 acres (224 ha) at an elevation of 778 feet (237 m) above sea level. It has two asphalt runways: 15/33 is 6,886 by 150 feet (2,099 x 46 m) and 8/26 is 5,802 by 150 feet (1,768 x 46 m). Airliners generally take off on Runway 15 due to wind from the south, and land crosswind on Runway 8 since that is the only runway with ILS and clear terrain for the approach. Flights from the northeast rarely land visually on Runway 15 to save the extra distance, instead circling to Runway 8. When the wind is from the north aircraft make a visual approach over the Santa Monica mountains for a left-base to final turn to Runway 33.

In the year ending February 28, 2023, the airport had 151,916 operations, average 416 per day: 45% scheduled commercial, 36% general aviation 19% air taxi, and <1% military. At that time, 81 aircraft were then based at this airport: 42 jet, 22 single-engine, 6 multi-engine, and 11 helicopter.

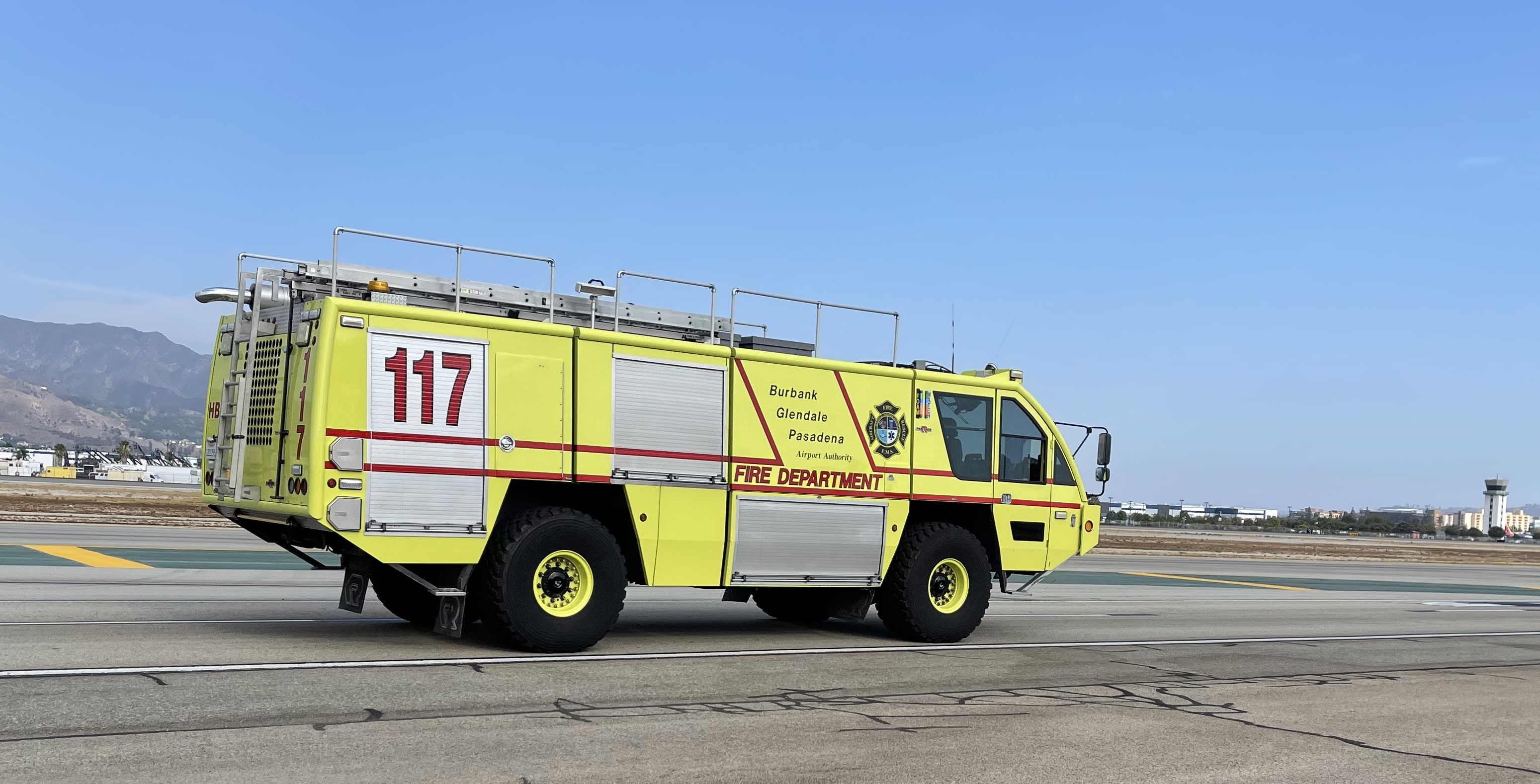
An aircraft rescue and firefighting engine of the Burbank–Glendale–Pasadena Airport Authority Fire Department

Hollywood Burbank Airport also has its own Aircraft Rescue and Firefighting (ARFF) station, which is housed in a hangar in the northwest quadrant of the airport. In addition to providing emergency services to support airport operations, the department supports the airport AED program, fire extinguisher inspections and training, in addition to inspections and emergency support for all airport structures. Beginning in 2012, the Burbank–Glendale–Pasadena Airport Authority equipped its ARFF with Rosenbauer Panther 1500 vehicles.

Burbank was the first airport in the US to operate state-of-the-art Class 4 ARFF vehicles employing compressed air foam (CAF) technologies, which provide enhanced firefighting capabilities when paired with other tools like forward looking infrared (FLIR) and thermal imaging cameras (TICs). The airport operates with five firefighters and one captain, while FAA standards require Index C airports like Hollywood Burbank to have a minimum of two firefighters and one captain.

=== Terminals ===
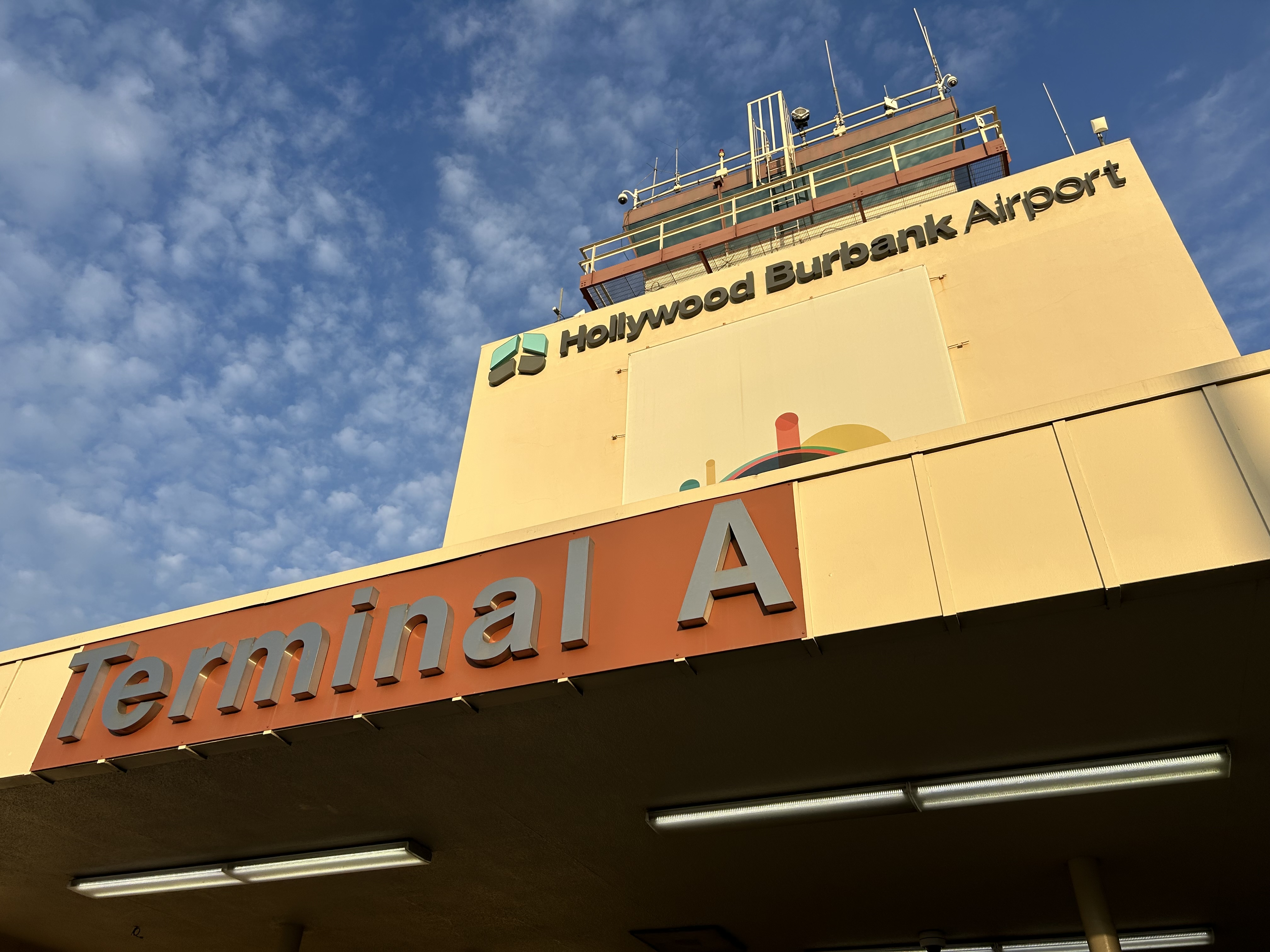
Terminal A in February 2026

A new terminal facility opened on October 13, 2026, which replaced the old terminal complex that is expected to be demolished in 2027. The terminal facility is 355,000 square feet, and includes 14 gates. Hollywood Burbank Airport had two terminals, "A" and "B", joined as part of the same building (originally built in 1930). Terminal A had nine gates numbered A1 to A9, Terminal B had five gates numbered B1 to B5.

=== Ground transportation ===
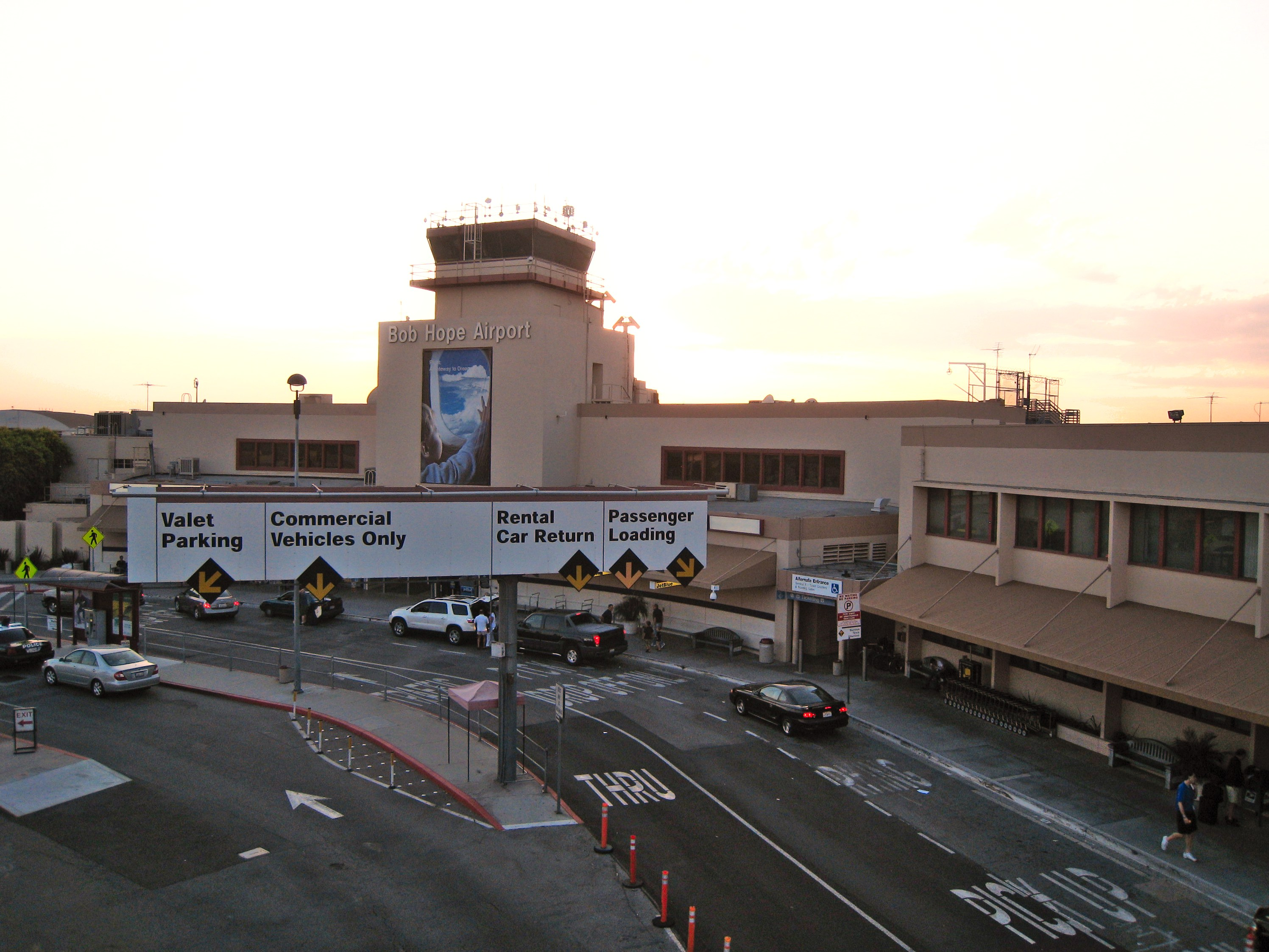
Passenger loading/unloading zone in front of terminal

Hollywood Burbank Airport is accessible via major regional freeways. Drivers may use the Hollywood Way exit off southbound Interstate 5, the Empire Avenue exit off northbound Interstate 5, the Hollywood Way exit off westbound State Route 134, the Pass Avenue exit off eastbound State Route 134, the Victory Boulevard exit off State Route 170, and the Barham Boulevard exit off northbound U.S. Route 101.

Car and pedestrian access to the terminal is located at the intersection of Hollywood Way and Winona Avenue. On-site parking features a multi-level parking structure offering short-term self-park and valet options. Long-term parking is available in Lots F and G in the old terminal area. These lots are connected to the terminal via shuttle buses. Rental car operations are consolidated at the Regional Intermodal Transportation Center, which is also connected to the terminal building via shuttle buses.

Pick-up and drop-off zones for Uber, Lyft, local taxis, and commercial shuttles are located within the ground transportation islands directly in front of the main terminal building.

Two regional rail stations serve the airport area. The Burbank Airport–South station, located south of the airport along Empire Avenue, is served by Metrolink's Ventura County Line and Amtrak's Coast Starlight and Pacific Surfliner. The Pacific Surfliner provides direct intercity service to San Luis Obispo, Santa Barbara, Los Angeles Union Station, Anaheim, and San Diego. Passengers at this station can cross Empire Avenue to access a complimentary airport shuttle at the RITC. The Burbank Airport–North station, located a few blocks north of the terminal near San Fernando Boulevard and Hollywood Way, is served by Metrolink's Antelope Valley Line and offers travelers a complimentary on-demand shuttle.

For bus service, Amtrak Thruway Routes 1 and 1C stop at the Burbank Airport–South station to provide direct connections to Santa Monica, UCLA, Van Nuys, Newhall, and Bakersfield. Additionally, the RITC is served by local transit lines, including Metro route 222 connecting to the Universal City station and the weekday BurbankBus Orange Route connecting to the North Hollywood Metro station.

== Airlines and destinations ==
=== Passenger ===
Airlines	Destinations
Alaska Airlines	Boise, Eugene, Portland (OR), Redmond/Bend, Santa Rosa, Seattle/Tacoma; Seasonal: Honolulu
Allegiant Air	Bellingham, Des Moines, Indianapolis, Provo
American Airlines	Dallas/Fort Worth; Seasonal: Phoenix–Sky Harbor
American Eagle	Phoenix–Sky Harbor
Breeze Airways	Eureka, Provo
Delta Air Lines	Atlanta, Salt Lake City
Delta Connection	Salt Lake City
JetBlue	Seasonal: New York–JFK
JSX	Concord (CA), Las Vegas, Oakland, Reno/Tahoe, Scottsdale; Seasonal: Monterey, Napa
Southwest Airlines	Albuquerque, Austin, Chicago–Midway, Dallas–Love, Denver, Honolulu, Las Vegas, Nashville, Oakland, Phoenix–Sky Harbor, Reno/Tahoe, Sacramento, San Francisco, San Jose (CA), Santa Rosa; Seasonal: Boise, St. Louis, Portland (OR)
United Airlines	Denver, San Francisco
United Express	San Francisco

== Statistics ==
=== Top destinations ===
Busiest domestic routes from BUR (February 2025 – January 2026)
Rank	City	Passengers	Carriers
1	Las Vegas, Nevada	404,940	Frontier, Southwest, Spirit
2	Oakland, California	293,470	Southwest
3	San Francisco, California	277,930	Southwest, United
4	Phoenix–Sky Harbor, Arizona	257,020	American, Southwest
5	Denver, Colorado	235,470	Frontier, Southwest, United
6	Sacramento, California	235,470	Southwest
7	(Washington (state)) Seattle/Tacoma, Washington	219,680	Alaska
8	San Jose, California	204,310	Southwest
9	Portland, Oregon	134,240	Alaska, Southwest
10	Dallas/Fort Worth, Texas	107,570	American

Note: JSX flights are not included in this data as they do not use the passenger terminal.

=== Airline market share ===
Top airlines at BUR (January 2025 – December 2025)
Rank	Airline	Passengers	Share
1	Southwest Airlines	3,515,852	56.5%
2	Alaska Airlines	956,077	15.4%
3	United Airlines	615,180	10.0%
4	American Airlines	327,135	5.3%
5	Spirit Airlines	265,431	4.3%
6	Delta Air Lines	250,117	4.0%
7	Avelo Airlines	191,700	3.1%
8	Frontier Airlines	56,997	0.9%
9	JetBlue Airways	40,990	0.7%

Note: JSX flights are not included in this data as they do not use the passenger terminal.

=== Annual traffic ===
Annual passenger traffic (enplaned + deplaned)
Year	Passengers	Year	Passengers	Year	Passengers
2000	4,748,742	2010	4,461,271	2020	1,995,348
2001	4,487,335	2011	4,301,568	2021	3,732,971
2002	4,620,683	2012	4,056,416	2022	5,898,736
2003	4,729,936	2013	3,844,092	2023	6,034,729
2004	4,916,800	2014	3,861,179	2024	6,550,281
2005	5,512,619	2015	3,943,629	2025	6,291,479
2006	5,689,291	2016	4,142,943		
2007	5,921,336	2017	4,739,466		
2008	5,331,404	2018	5,263,972		
2009	4,588,433	2019	5,983,737		

View source data.

=== Freight/mail (lb.) ===
(2024)

Rank	Airline	Cargo amount
1	UPS Airlines	41,639,581
2	Fedex Express	29,825,924
3	Ameriflight	1,971,925

== Accidents and incidents ==
- On September 21, 1938, USAAC Chief Maj. Gen. Oscar Westover was killed in the crash of Northrop A-17AS, 36-349, c/n 289, '1', out of Bolling Field, Washington, D.C., in a crosswind short of the runway. The single-engine attack design, used as a high-speed staff transport, crashed into a house at 1007 Scott Road in Burbank. Also killed was Westover's mechanic, S/Sgt Samuel Hymes. (Another source identifies him as Sgt. Samuel Hyne.) Northeast Air Base, Massachusetts, was renamed Westover Field on December 1, 1939, later Westover AFB on January 13, 1948. The location of the crash may indicate that Gen. Westover's intended landing field was not Hollywood Burbank Airport (then Union Air Terminal), but a nearby landing field, Lockheed Aircraft Company Plant B-1 Airfield (34.189°N, 118.331°W), 1 mile southeast of Hollywood Burbank Airport, which existed from ca. 1928 until World War II. The site is now (2025) the Empire Center Shopping Center, with a Staples, Lowe's, and Target where the runway had been.
- On August 6, 1945, leading U.S. fighter ace Richard Bong was killed when his plane's primary fuel pump malfunctioned during takeoff on the acceptance flight of P-80A 44–85048. Bong either forgot to switch to the auxiliary fuel pump, or for some reason was unable to do so. Bong bailed out of the aircraft but was too low for his parachute to deploy. The plane crashed into a narrow field at Oxnard St & Satsuma Ave, North Hollywood.
- On October 31, 1951, a Pacific Southwest DC-3 crashed shortly after take-off into Valhalla Memorial Park Cemetery, immediately south of the airport. Though damaged, the fuselage remained intact and there were only very minor injuries.
- On September 8, 1955, Currey Air Transport Flight 24, a Douglas DC-3 bound for Oakland, crashed on the airport property while returning to the airfield after experiencing an engine failure shortly after takeoff. The plane, N74663, struck a power line on the southern boundary of the airport, causing it to crash into two parked Air Force C-54 aircraft and a Lockheed Aircraft service hangar. The pilot, co-pilot and an airport employee on the ground were killed; the plane's stewardess and one passenger were seriously injured. The remaining 29 passengers on board received minor injuries.
- On December 14, 1962, a Flying Tiger Line Lockheed L-1049H Super Constellation freighter (N6913C) crashed in dense fog 1 1/2 miles west of the airport during an instrument landing system (ILS) approach to Runway 07. The Constellation clipped a telephone pole and billboard and crashed in an industrial and residential neighborhood near the intersection of Lankershim Boulevard and Vose Street in North Hollywood after the aircraft's 38-year-old pilot suffered a heart attack at a critical point in the landing approach. All five occupants of the Constellation—the pilot, co-pilot, flight engineer and two non-revenue passengers—died in the crash. Also killed were two persons in a commercial building and a teenage girl in a house that were among the structures struck by the plane.
- On December 5, 1982, Douglas C-53 N163E operated by P. Crossman was damaged beyond repair in a taxiing accident.
- On March 5, 2000, Southwest Airlines Flight 1455, upon landing on Runway 8 at Burbank following a flight from Las Vegas, overran the runway, injuring 44. The Boeing 737 crashed through a metal blast barrier at the end of the runway, then an airport perimeter fence, and came to rest in the traffic lanes of Hollywood Way, a main north–south thoroughfare. The plane stopped near a Chevron gasoline station located across the street from the runway. The incident resulted in the dismissal of the pilots. The Chevron gasoline station was subsequently closed and removed due to safety concerns.
- On September 21, 2005, JetBlue Flight 292 took off from Burbank, and the nose gear failed to retract and instead jammed sideways. The aircraft spent several hours in the air before safely making an emergency landing at LAX, with 140 passengers and 6 crew members aboard. The Airbus A320 was originally bound for JFK International Airport, in New York City. After the aircraft took off, the incident was quickly captured by news helicopters which ran feed that was shown live nationally on cable news. Many passengers on the flight said they watched images of their own aircraft's flight on JetBlue's LiveTV system.
- On October 13, 2006, a Gulfstream Aerospace jet overran the runway upon landing. There were no reported injuries amongst the five passengers and two crew members. New York Yankees third baseman Alex Rodriguez was on board, en route to attend the funeral of teammate Cory Lidle. Rodriguez was uninjured, but the accident happened two days after the fatal plane crash of his teammate.
- On December 6, 2018, Southwest Airlines Flight 278 from Oakland overran the runway in heavy rain. The flight was stopped by the EMAS installed following the similar Southwest Airlines Flight 1455 incident in 2000.

On January 27, 2026, the chair of the National Transportation Safety Board voiced alarm about a potential mid-air collision that could happen at Burbank Airport, given the mixing of commercial, private, and helicopter traffic, especially given Burbank's location near Van Nuys Airport.

== See also ==
- California World War II Army Airfields
- List of airports in California
