= Engineered materials arrestor system =

Bed of material at a runway's end to stop aircraft overrun

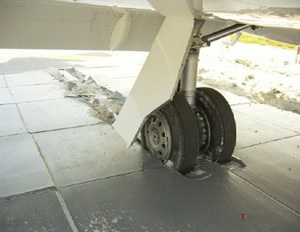
EMAS bed after being run over by landing gear

An engineered materials arrestor system, engineered materials arresting system (EMAS), or arrester bed is a bed of engineered materials built at the end of a runway to reduce the severity of the consequences of a runway excursion. Engineered materials are defined in FAA Advisory Circular No 150/5220-22B as "high energy absorbing materials of selected strength, which will reliably and predictably crush under the weight of an aircraft". While the current technology involves lightweight, crushable concrete blocks, any material that has been approved to meet the FAA Advisory Circular can be used for an EMAS. The purpose of an EMAS is to stop an aircraft overrun with no human injury and minimal aircraft damage. As the aircraft crushes the EMAS material, it loses energy and slows down. An EMAS is similar in concept to the runaway truck ramp or race circuit gravel trap, made of gravel or sand. It is intended to stop an aircraft that has overshot a runway when there is insufficient free space for a standard runway safety area (RSA). Multiple patents have been issued on the construction and design on the materials and process.

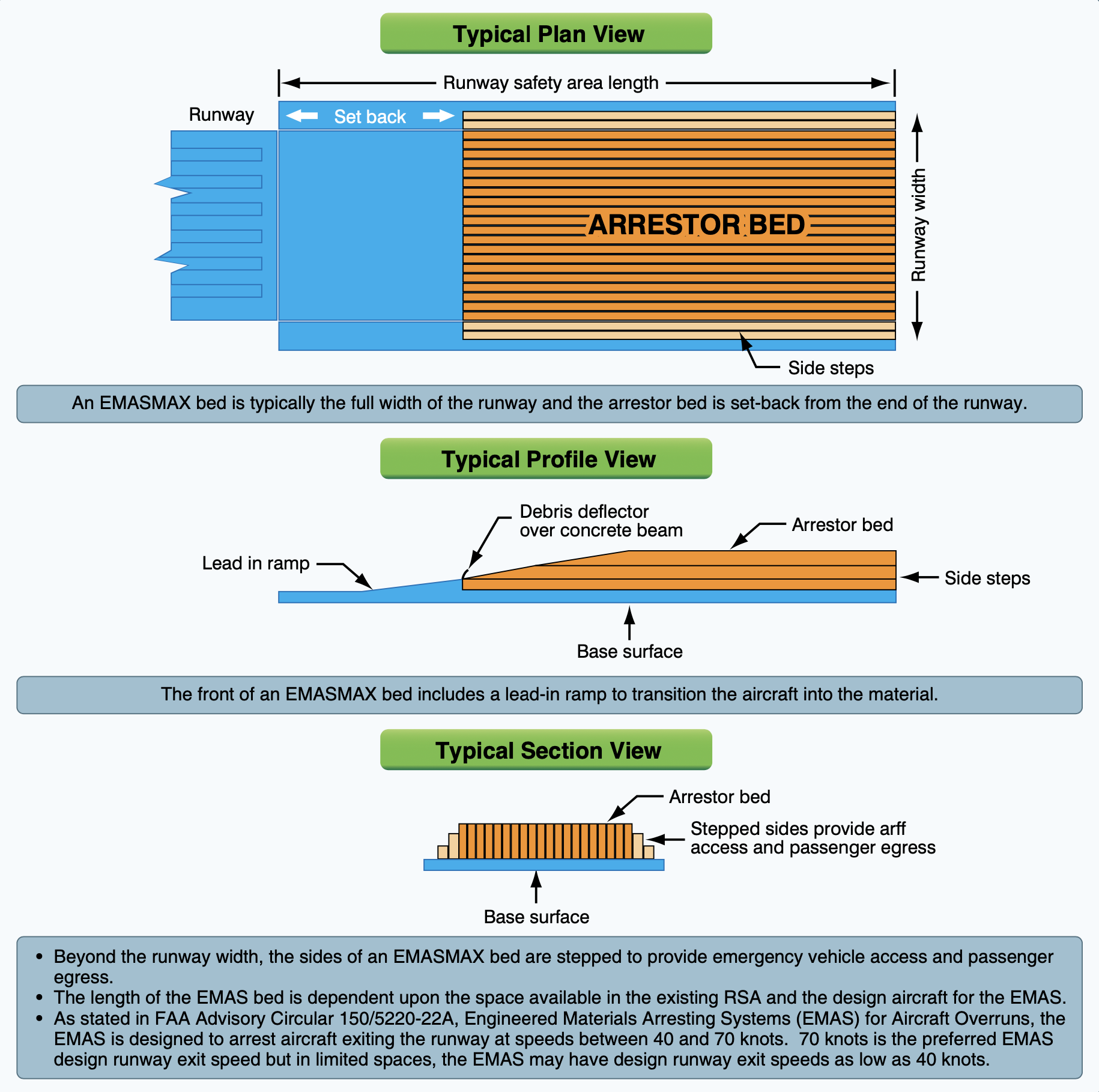
Plan view, profile view, section view of a typical EMASMAX system.

FAA Advisory Circular 150/5220-22B explains that an EMAS may not be effective for incidents involving aircraft of less than 11,000 kilograms (25,000 lb) weight. It also clarifies that an EMAS is not the same as a stopway, which is defined in FAA Advisory Circular 150/5300-13A, Section 312. Pilots are advised, if they know the airplane is going to overrun onto an EMAS installation, to maintain directional control of the aircraft and roll straight into it. By doing this, the aircraft will come to a complete stop over a short distance, regardless of the runway conditions or braking action being experienced.

As of May 2017, the International Civil Aviation Organization (ICAO) has been working on developing a harmonized regulation regarding arresting systems.

Research projects completed in Europe have looked into the cost-effectiveness of EMAS. Arrestor beds have been installed at airports where the runway safety areas are below standards, and their ability to stop aircraft with minimal or no damage to the airframe and its occupants has proven to bring results far beyond the cost of installations. The latest report, "Estimated Cost-Benefit Analysis of Runway Severity Reduction Based on Actual Arrestments", shows how the money saved through the first 11 arrestments has reached a calculated total of 1.9 billion USD, thus saving more than $1 B over the estimated cost of development (R&D, all installations worldwide, maintenance and repairs reaching a total of USD 600 million). The study suggests that mitigating the consequences of runway excursions worldwide may turn out to be much more cost-effective than the current focus on reducing the already very low probability of occurrence.

== United States installations ==
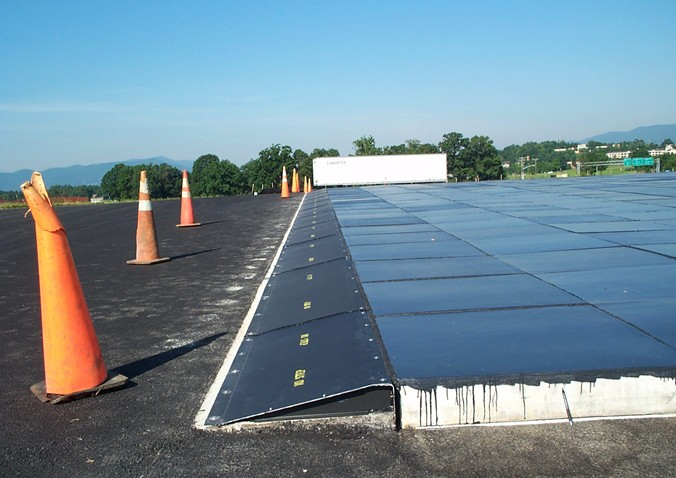
EMAS under construction. The slope part on the left is a blast shield.

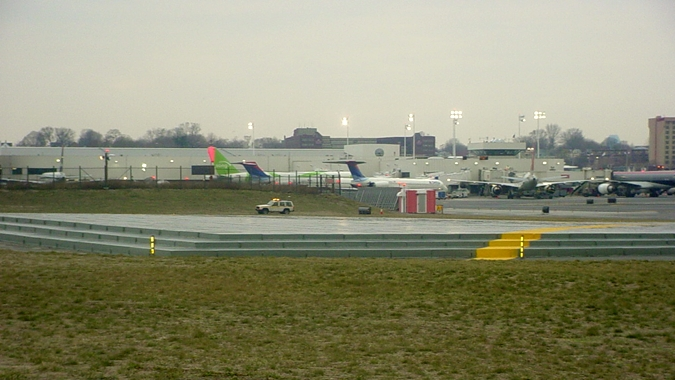
Higher EMAS bed with side steps to allow aircraft rescue and firefighting (ARFF) access and passenger egress.

The FAA's design criteria for new airports designate Runway Safety Areas (RSAs) to increase the margin of safety if an overrun occurs and to provide additional access room for response vehicles. A United States federal law required that the length of RSAs in airports was to be 1,000 feet (300 m) by the end of 2015, in a response to a runway overrun into a highway at Teterboro Airport in New Jersey. At airports built before these standards were put into effect, the FAA has funded the installation of EMAS at the ends of main runways. The minimum recommended overall length of an EMAS installation is 600 feet (180 m), of which at least 400 feet (120 m) is to consist of the frangible material.

As of 2017, the FAA reported that EMAS systems had been used 12 times, but that in some situations pilots tried to avoid the EMAS, steering to the grass sides in 30–40 kn (56–74 km/h; 35–46 mph) low-energy events in order to avoid publicity.

As of April 2019, ESCO's EMAS is installed at 112 runway ends at 68 airports in the United States, with plans to install three EMAS systems at two additional U.S. airports.

As of September 2024, the FAA reported that EMASMAX® is installed at 121 runway ends at 71 airports in the United States.

== Non-U.S. installations ==
Of the 15 non-U.S. installations, eight were provided by Zodiac Arresting Systems (two in China, two in Madrid, one in Taipei, Taiwan (Songshan Airport), two in Norway and one in Saudi Arabia), six were provided by RunwaySafe (one in Switzerland, and three in overseas departments of France – one in Reunion Island, two in Mayotte), one in Japan, one in Germany, two in Brazil and one provided by Hankge (China).

The first EMAS installation within Australasia was at Queenstown International Airport (NZQN / ZQN) in New Zealand, which finished in March 2025. An EMAS arrestor bed was installed at each end of the Runway 05/23 using the EMASMAX system developed by Runway Safe AB.

In November 2024 Wellington International Airport (NZWN / WLG) in New Zealand also announced that part of a NZ$500m programme of infrastructure works will include the installation of an EMAS system and thus provide a small increase in the operational length of the runway. This project was completed in March 2026, utilising over 3000 individual EMAS blocks to increase the available landing distance by 143m and available take-off distance by 37m.

== United Kingdom installations ==
The first EMAS installation in the United Kingdom was at RAF Northolt (EGWU / NHT) in west London, United Kingdom. The EMAS installation occurred as part of a wider airfield improvement programme that took place in 2019 that included the resurfacing of the runways. The EMAS installation on Runway 07/25 was undertaken by Martin O'Connell Associates to implement the Runway Safe AB solution.

Over the winter of 2022/23 two EMAS arrestor beds were installed, one at each end of Runway 09/27 at London City Airport (EGLC / LCY) in London, United Kingdom. The chosen solution was developed by Runway Safe AB and installed by blu-3 (UK) Limited.

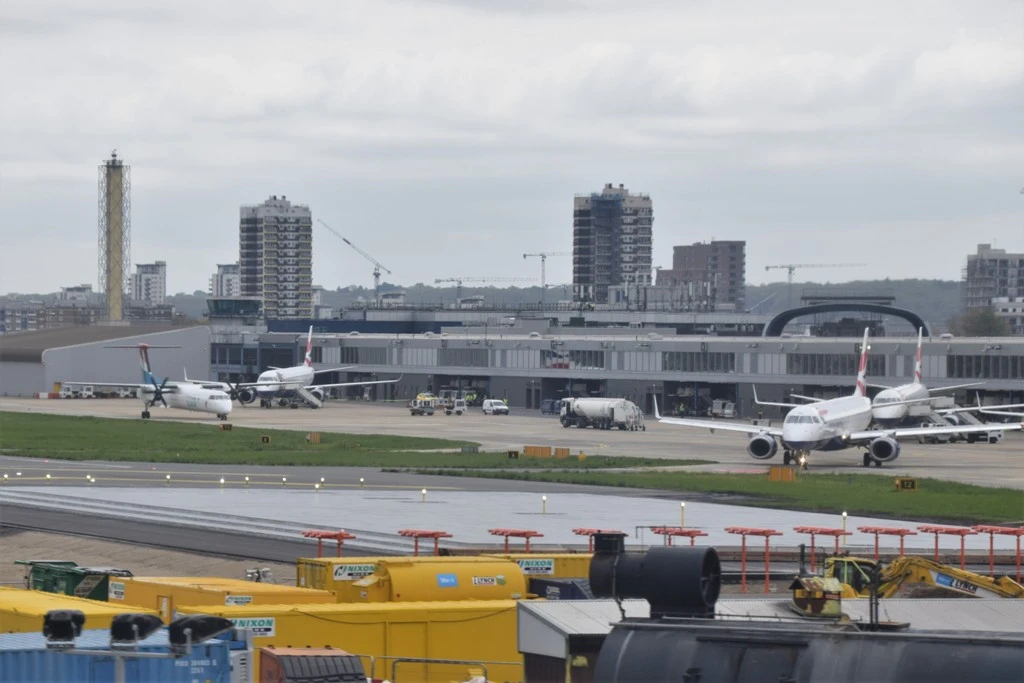
Runway 27 departure end EMAS installation at London City Airport

== FAA-approved manufacturers ==
As of February 2018, there were three recognized EMAS materials (from two manufacturers worldwide) that meet the FAA requirements of Advisory Circular 150-5220-22B, "Engineered Materials Arresting Systems for Aircraft Overruns." (The FAA must review and approve each EMAS installation.)

The first EMAS was developed in the mid-1990s by ESCO/Engineered Arresting Systems Corp. (later Zodiac Arresting Systems) as part of a collaboration and technical acceptance by the FAA. The fourth generation EMAS arrestor beds are composed of blocks of lightweight, crushable cellular concrete material, encased in jet blast resistant protection, designed to safely stop airplanes that overshoot runways. Zodiac's EMAS is installed on over 110 airport runways at over 65 airports on three continents. Zodiac's EMAS has undergone aircraft test runs at speeds up 55 knots (102 km/h; 63 mph) and is the only EMAS that has safely stopped aircraft in emergency overrun situations at commercial airports. Zodiac stopped production of EMAS systems as the U.S market slowed down and competition increased in the international market.

The Swedish company Runway Safe AB developed an EMAS system, a foamed silica bed made from recycled glass contained within a high-strength plastic mesh system anchored to the pavement at the end of the runway. The foamed silica is poured into lanes bounded by the mesh and covered with a poured cement layer and treated with a top coat of sealant.

A third manufacturer, certified by the Chinese CAAC, has a product that is very similar to the original Zodiac EMAS; however, it is not FAA approved.

== Incidents ==
There have been numerous cases of EMAS systems working as designed in real-life scenarios; these examples include:

- In May 1999, a Saab 340 commuter aircraft with 30 persons aboard overran the runway at JFK.
- In May 2003, a Gemini Cargo MD-11 cargo aircraft with 3 persons aboard overran the runway at JFK.
- In January 2005, a Boeing 747 cargo aircraft with 3 persons aboard overran the runway at JFK.
- In July 2006, a Dassault Falcon 900 business aircraft with 5 persons aboard overran the runway at Greenville Downtown Airport in South Carolina.
- In July 2008, an Airbus A320 commercial airliner with 145 persons aboard overran the runway at Chicago's O'Hare Airport.
- On 19 January 2010, a Bombardier CRJ-200 commercial regional airliner with 34 persons aboard overran the runway at Yeager Airport in Charleston, West Virginia after a rejected takeoff.
- On 1 October 2010, a Gulfstream G-IV business aircraft with 10 persons aboard overran the runway at Teterboro Airport in Teterboro, New Jersey.
- On 2 November 2011, a Cessna Citation II business aircraft with 5 persons aboard overran the runway at Key West International Airport in Key West, Florida.
- In October 2013, a Cessna 680 Citation business aircraft with 8 persons aboard overran the runway at Palm Beach International in West Palm Beach, Florida.
- In January 2016, a Dassault Falcon 20 aircraft with 2 persons aboard overran the runway at Chicago Executive Airport in Wheeling, Illinois.
- In October 2016, a Boeing 737 aircraft with 37 persons aboard, including Republican vice-presidential candidate Mike Pence, overran the runway at LaGuardia Airport, New York.
- In April 2017, a Cessna 750 Citation aircraft with 2 persons aboard overran the runway at Bob Hope Airport in Burbank, California.
- On 4 February 2018, a Beech Jet 400A aircraft with 2 persons aboard overran the runway at Burke Lakefront Airport (BKL) in Cleveland, Ohio.
- On December 6, 2018, Southwest Airlines Flight 278 from Oakland to Hollywood Burbank Airport overran the runway in heavy rain. The flight was stopped by the EMAS installed following the similar Southwest Airlines Flight 1455 incident in 2000.
- On 27 February 2019 an Embraer Phenom 100 operated by Quest Diagnostic Laboratories overran a runway at the Charles B. Wheeler Kansas City Downtown Airport (KMKC) at 4:28am local time resulting in the safe stopping of the aircraft with the pilot being the only occupant aboard.
- On 4 February 2021, a Dassault F900 aircraft with 2 persons aboard overran the runway at Chicago Executive-Wheeling Airport (PWK) in Chicago, Illinois.
- On 21 July 2021, a Cessna Citation Excel aircraft with 6 persons aboard overran the runway at Reading Regional Airport (RDG) in Reading, Pennsylvania.
- On 22 September 2021, an Aero Vodochody L-39C Albatros aircraft operated by Aero Flight Solutions LLC with 1 person aboard overran the runway at Witham Field Airport (SUA) in Stuart, Florida.
- On 20 March 2022, a Cessna 650 aircraft with 2 persons aboard overran the runway at Key West International Airport (EYW) in Key West, Florida.
- On 9 April 2023, a Cessna 402C aircraft with 2 persons aboard overran the runway at Key West International Airport (EYW) in Key West, Florida.
- On 18 October 2023, a Beechcraft BE30 aircraft with 2 persons aboard overran the runway at DeKalb-Peachtree Airport (PDK) in Atlanta, Georgia.
- On 20 July 2024, a Hawker 900XP aircraft with 2 persons aboard overran the runway at Telluride Regional Airport (TEX) in Telluride, Colorado.
- On 3 September 2025, a Canadian Bombardier Challenger 300 overran the runway at Boca Raton Public Airport, before coming to a complete stop just before a busy road, thanks to Engineered Material Arresting System.
- On 3 September 2025, a Gulfstream G150 overran the runway at Chicago Executive Airport and was stopped by the EMAS.
- On 24 September 2025, a Embraer ERJ-145 aircraft operated by CommuteAir on behalf of United Airlines with 53 persons aboard overran the runway at Roanoke-Blacksburg Regional Airport (KROA) in Roanoke, Virginia.

Additional media coverage of EMAS statistics, installations, and general news include:

- After the 8 December 2005 overshoot of Southwest Airlines Flight 1248 at Midway International Airport in Chicago, Illinois, which is located in a heavily congested area, an EMAS was installed on Rwy 13C/31C.
- On 13 October 2006, New York Yankees player Alex Rodriguez's private jet was brought to a halt safely by the EMAS installation at Bob Hope Airport in Burbank, California. The system was installed after the 2000 Southwest Airlines Flight 1455 runway overshoot that injured 43 passengers and the captain.
- On 1 May 2017, the FAA issued a summary citing twelve incidents of aircraft stopped by EMAS, involving a total of 284 passengers and crew.

== See also ==
- Index of aviation articles
- Arresting gear - a cable-based system used to arrest an aircraft, used particularly on aircraft carriers
- Brodie landing system
- Runaway truck ramp
