= Runway safety area =

Airport runway buffer zone

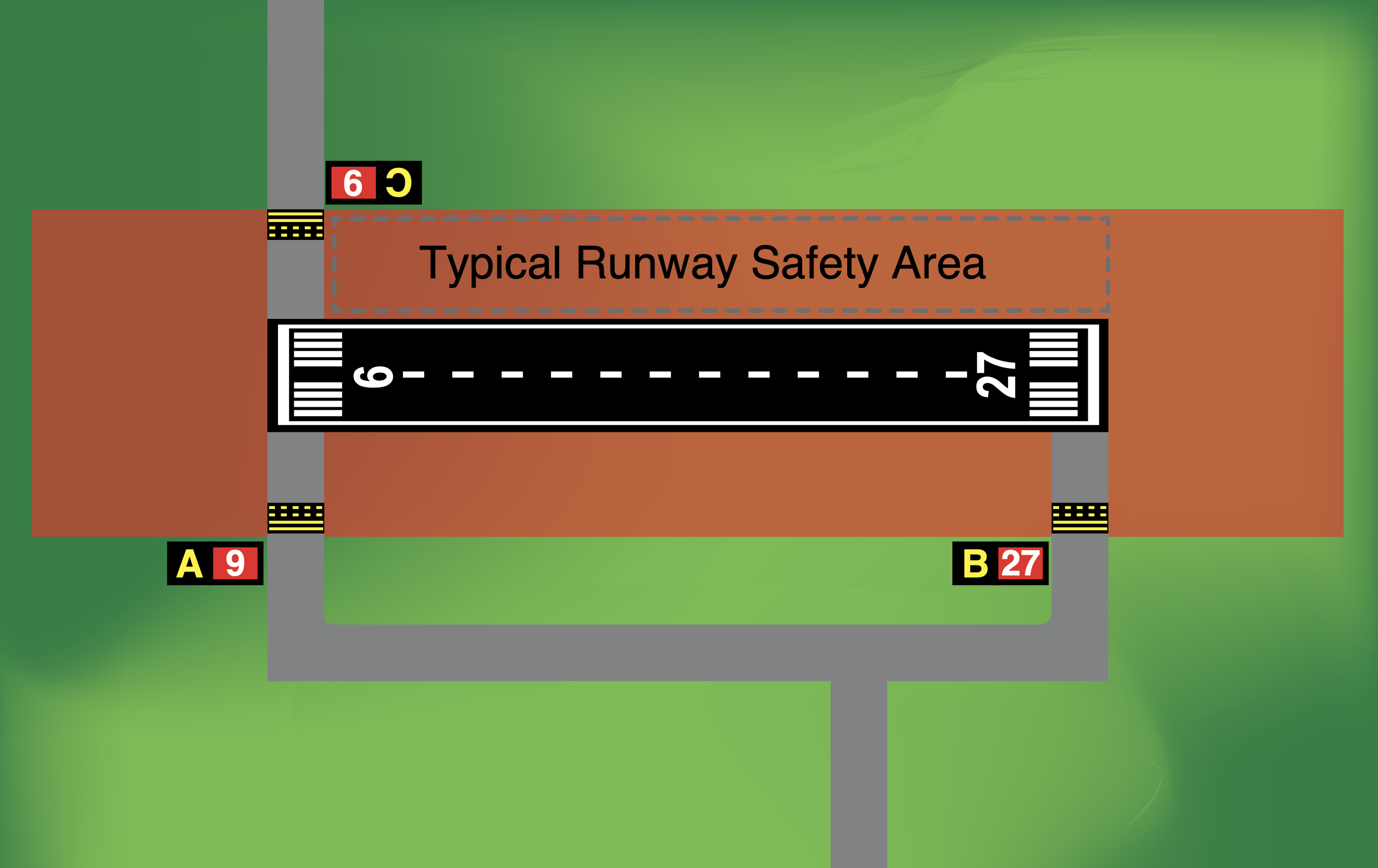
A typical runway safety area, marked in brown color.

A runway safety area (RSA) or runway end safety area (RESA, if at the end of the runway) is defined as "the surface surrounding the runway prepared or suitable for reducing the risk of damage to airplanes in the event of an undershoot, overshoot, or excursion from the runway."

Past standards called for the RSA to extend only 60m (200 feet) from the ends of the runway. Currently, the international standard ICAO requires a 90m (300 feet) RESA starting from the end of the runway strip (which itself is 60m from the end of the runway), and recommends but not requires a 240m RESA beyond that. In the U.S., the recommended RSA may extend to 500 feet (150 m) in width, and 1,000 feet (300 m) beyond each runway end (according to U.S. Federal Aviation Administration recommendations; 1000 feet is equivalent to the international ICAO-RESA of 240m plus 60m strip). The standard dimensions have increased over time to accommodate larger and faster aircraft, and to improve safety.

== Historical development ==
In the early years of aviation, all airplanes operated from relatively unimproved airfields. As aviation developed, the alignment of takeoff and landing paths centered on a well defined area known as a landing strip. Thereafter, the requirements of more advanced aircraft necessitated improving or paving the center portion of the landing strip. The term "landing strip" was retained to describe the graded area surrounding and upon which the runway or improved surface was constructed.

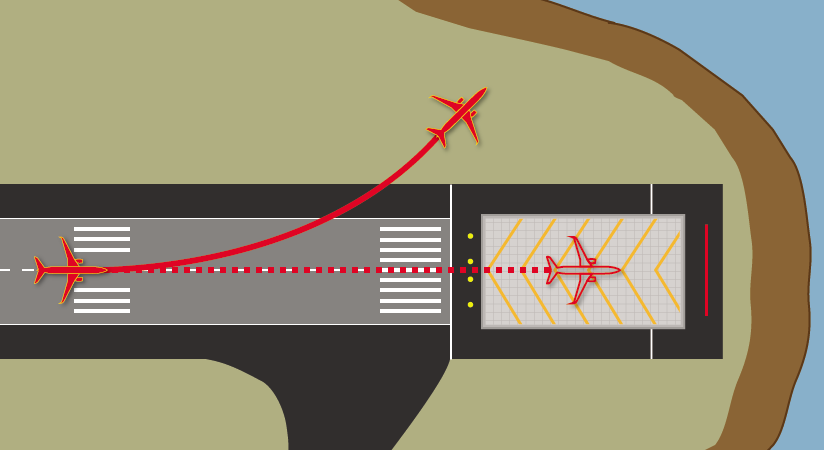

The primary role of the landing strip changed to that of a safety area surrounding the runway. This area had to be capable, under normal (dry) conditions, of supporting aircraft without causing structural damage to the airframe or injury to the occupants. Later, the designation of the area was changed to "runway safety area," to reflect its functional role. The runway safety area enhances the safety of aircraft that undershoot, overrun, or veer off the runway, and it provides greater accessibility for firefighting and rescue equipment.

== Warnings in Canada ==
After the Air France Flight 358 accident in Toronto, Ontario, in 2005, the Transportation Safety Board of Canada (TSB) recommended changes to the runway safety areas on runways at Canadian airports. Since 2007, TSB suggest that airports employ EMAS (engineered material arresting system) on Canadian runways by constructing a 300 m (as per ICAO standard of 60 m + 240 m or FAA 300 m) overrun at the end of all runways.

The EMAS can be of benefit where the aircraft leaves the runway neatly at the end, and there are several clear examples where it saved an aircraft from a serious accident. All EMAS are tailor fitted to a specific runway, allowing them to offer the best performance within the available area. Typically, slopes, distance, type of aircraft etc. are taken into consideration. The predicted and controlled braking force will slow the aircraft without damaging it under all weather conditions. If an EMAS is damaged, it will require repair, but this does not mean that the runway must be closed after an overrun, as the rest of the EMAS arrestor bed remains effective even if there are furrows caused by tire tracks across a portion of the bed.

== See also ==
- Index of aviation articles
- Engineered materials arrestor system
- British Airways Flight 38
- Obstacle-free zone
