= November 13 =

November 13 this year in various calendars
- Friday, 13 November 2026
Akan	Fofie
Armenian	26 Trē 1476
Aztec	Tlacaxipehualiztli 2, 9 Cuāuhtli
Babylonian	2 Arakhsamna, 2337 SE
Balinese pawukon	Menga, Pasah, Sri, Wage, Tungleh, Sukra of Landep, Ludra, Dangu, Pandita
Bengali	28 Kartik, BS 1433
Chinese	Yin Metal Rabbit・Neck Mansion; Fire Horse Year, Month 10, Day 5 (Lidong, 9 days until Xiaoxue)
Common Era	13 November 2026 CE
Coptic	4 Hathor, AM 1743
Egyptian	1 Pharmuthi, 2775 NE
Ethiopian	4 H̱edār, 2019 Amätä Məhrät
French Republican	Décade III, Duodi de Brumaire de l'Année 235 de la République
Gregorian	13 November, AD 2026
Hebrew	3 Kislev, AM 5787
Hindu	Mūla・Sukarman; Solar: 27 Kārtika, 1948 SE; Lunisolar: Caturthī, Śukla pakṣa of Kārtika, 2083 VE; Rāudra・5127 KY・1,872,892
Icelandic	Föstudagur, 21 Gormánuður 2026
Islamic	2 Jumada al-thani, AH 1448 (using tabular method)
ISO week date	2026-W46-5
Japanese	5 Kannazuki, Reiwa 8 (Rittō, 9 days until Shōsetsu)
Julian	31 October, AD 2026 (AM 7535)
Julian day	2461358
Korean	5 Dwaejidal, 4359 DE
Maya	13.0.14.1.15; 8 Ceh, 9 Men
Roman	Pridie Kalendas Novembres, MMDCCLXXIX AUC
Solar Hijri	22 Aban, SH 1405
Tibetan	4 smin drug, me pho rta 2153 or 1772 or 1000

<<	November					>>
Su	Mo	Tu	We	Th	Fr	Sa
1	2	3	4	5	6	7
8	9	10	11	12	13	14
15	16	17	18	19	20	21
22	23	24	25	26	27	28
29	30
2026

November 13 in recent years
2026 (Friday)
2025 (Thursday)
2024 (Wednesday)
2023 (Monday)
2022 (Sunday)
2021 (Saturday)
2020 (Friday)
2019 (Wednesday)
2018 (Tuesday)
2017 (Monday)

November 13 is the 317th day of the year (318th in leap years) in the Gregorian calendar; 48 days remain until the end of the year.

== Events ==
=== Pre-1600 ===
- 1002 – English king Æthelred II orders the killing of all Danes in England, known today as the St. Brice's Day massacre.
- 1093 – Battle of Alnwick: in an English victory over the Scots, Malcolm III of Scotland and his son Edward are killed.
- 1160 – Louis VII of France marries Adela of Champagne.

=== 1601–1900 ===
- 1642 – First English Civil War: Battle of Turnham Green: The Royalist forces withdraw in the face of the Parliamentarian army and fail to take London.
- 1715 – Jacobite rising in Scotland: Battle of Sheriffmuir: The forces of the Kingdom of Great Britain halt the Jacobite advance, although the action is inconclusive.
- 1775 – American Revolutionary War: Patriot revolutionary forces under Gen. Richard Montgomery occupy Montreal.
- 1809 – A British flotilla arrived at Ras Al Khaimah and launched an amphibious assault on the town, as a part of the Persian Gulf campaign of 1809.
- 1833 – Great Meteor Storm of 1833.
- 1841 – James Braid first sees a demonstration of animal magnetism by Charles Lafontaine, which leads to his study of the subject he eventually calls hypnotism.
- 1851 – The Denny Party lands at Alki Point, before moving to the other side of Elliott Bay to what would become Seattle.
- 1864 – American Civil War: The three-day Battle of Bull's Gap ends in a Union rout as Confederates under Major General John C. Breckinridge pursue them to Strawberry Plains, Tennessee.
- 1887 – Bloody Sunday clashes in central London.
- 1893 – 13 November stabbing is committed by Léon Léauthier during the Ère des attentats. This is an influential event in the birth of modern terrorism.

=== 1901–present ===
- 1901 – The 1901 Caister lifeboat disaster occurs, killing 9 of the 12 crew members.
- 1914 – Zaian War: Berber tribesmen inflict the heaviest defeat of French forces in Morocco at the Battle of El Herri.
- 1916 – World War I: Prime Minister of Australia Billy Hughes is expelled from the Labor Party over his support for conscription.
- 1917 – World War I: beginning of the First Battle of Monte Grappa (in Italy known as the "First Battle of the Piave"). The Austro-Hungarian Armed Forces, despite help from the German Alpenkorps and numerical superiority, will fail their offensive against the Italian Army now led by its new chief of staff Armando Diaz.
- 1918 – World War I: Allied troops occupy Constantinople, the capital of the Ottoman Empire.
- 1922 – The United States Supreme Court upholds mandatory vaccinations for public school students in Zucht v. King.
- 1927 – The Holland Tunnel opens to traffic as the first Hudson River vehicle tunnel linking New Jersey to New York City.
- 1940 – Walt Disney's animated musical film Fantasia is first released at New York's Broadway Theatre, on the first night of a roadshow.
- 1942 – World War II: Naval Battle of Guadalcanal: U.S. and Japanese ships engage in an intense, close-quarters surface naval engagement during the Guadalcanal campaign.
- 1945 – FC Dynamo Moscow open their exhibition tour of the United Kingdom with a 3–3 draw against Chelsea, breaking the record attendance for a British club football match.
- 1947 – The Soviet Union completes development of the AK-47, one of the first proper assault rifles.
- 1950 – General Carlos Delgado Chalbaud, President of Venezuela, is assassinated in Caracas.
- 1954 – Great Britain defeats France to capture the first ever Rugby League World Cup in Paris in front of around 30,000 spectators.
- 1956 – The Supreme Court of the United States affirmed a lower court ruling that invalidated Alabama laws requiring segregated buses, thus ending the Montgomery bus boycott.
- 1965 – The SS Yarmouth Castle catches fire and sinks, killing 87.
- 1966 – In response to Fatah raids against Israelis near the West Bank border, Israel launches an attack on the village of As-Samu.
- 1966 – All Nippon Airways Flight 533 crashes into the Seto Inland Sea near Matsuyama Airport in Japan, killing 50 people.
- 1967 – The first of its many UFO sightings is made at Pudasjärvi, Finland.
- 1969 – Vietnam War: Anti-war protesters in Washington, D.C. stage a symbolic March Against Death.
- 1970 – Bhola cyclone: A 240 km/h (150 mph) tropical cyclone hits the densely populated Ganges Delta region of East Pakistan (now Bangladesh), killing an estimated 500,000 people in one night.
- 1982 – Ray Mancini defeats Duk Koo Kim in a boxing match held in Las Vegas. Kim's subsequent death (on November 18) leads to significant changes in the sport.
- 1982 – The Vietnam Veterans Memorial is dedicated in Washington, D.C. after a march to its site by thousands of Vietnam War veterans.
- 1985 – The volcano Nevado del Ruiz erupts and melts a glacier, causing a lahar (volcanic mudslide) that buries Armero, Colombia, killing approximately 23,000 people.
- 1985 – Xavier Suárez is sworn in as Miami's first Cuban-born mayor.
- 1989 – Hans-Adam II, the present Prince of Liechtenstein, begins his reign on the death of his father.
- 1990 – In Aramoana, New Zealand, David Gray shoots dead 13 people in a massacre before being tracked down and killed by police the next day.
- 1991 – The Republic of Karelia, an autonomous republic of Russia, is formed from the former Karelian ASSR.
- 1992 – The High Court of Australia rules in Dietrich v The Queen that although there is no absolute right to have publicly funded counsel, in most circumstances a judge should grant any request for an adjournment or stay when an accused is unrepresented.
- 1993 – China Northern Airlines Flight 6901 crashes on approach to Ürümqi Diwopu International Airport in Ürümqi, China, killing 12 people.
- 1994 – In a referendum, voters in Sweden decide to join the European Union.
- 1995 – Mozambique becomes the first state to join the Commonwealth of Nations without having been part of the former British Empire.
- 1995 – Nigeria Airways Flight 357 crashes at Kaduna International Airport in Kaduna, Nigeria, killing 11 people and injuring 66.
- 1996 – As part of the Great Internet Mersenne Prime Search (GIMPS) project, Joel Armengaud discovers the project's first Mersenne prime number, $2^{1398269}-1$, a number with 420,921 digits.
- 2000 – Philippine House Speaker Manny Villar passes the articles of impeachment against Philippine President Joseph Estrada.
- 2001 – War on terror: In the first such act since World War II, US President George W. Bush signs an executive order allowing military tribunals against foreigners suspected of connections to terrorist acts or planned acts on the United States.
- 2002 – Iraq disarmament crisis: Iraq agrees to the terms of the UN Security Council Resolution 1441.
- 2012 – A total solar eclipse occurs in parts of Australia and the South Pacific.
- 2015 – Islamic State operatives carry out a series of coordinated terrorist attacks in Paris, including suicide bombings, mass shootings and a hostage crisis. The terrorists kill 130 people, making it the deadliest attack in France since the Second World War.
- 2022 – A mass stabbing occurs in Moscow, Idaho in which four University of Idaho students are killed in off-campus housing.
- 2026 – The asphalt and bitumen tanker Atlantic Asphalt collides with the river cruise ship American Heritage in New Orleans, Louisiana. 32 were injured and no fatalities were reported.

== Births ==
=== Pre-1600 ===
- 354 – Augustine of Hippo, Roman bishop and theologian (died 430)
- 1312 – Edward III of England (died 1377)
- 1453 – Christoph I, Margrave of Baden-Baden (1475–1515) (died 1527)
- 1486 – Johann Eck, German theologian and academic (died 1543)
- 1493 – William IV, Duke of Bavaria (died 1550)
- 1504 – Philip I, Landgrave of Hesse (died 1567)
- 1572 – Cyril Lucaris, Greek patriarch and theologian (died 1638)
- 1559 – Albert VII, Archduke of Austria, Governor of the Low Countries (died 1621)

=== 1601–1900 ===
- 1699 – Jan Zach, Czech violinist, organist, and composer (died 1773)
- 1710 – Charles Simon Favart, French director and playwright (died 1792)
- 1715 – Dorothea Erxleben, German first female medical doctor (died 1762)
- 1732 – John Dickinson, American lawyer and politician, 5th Governor of Pennsylvania (died 1808)
- 1760 – Jiaqing Emperor of China (died 1820)
- 1761 – John Moore, Scottish general and politician (died 1809)
- 1780 – Ranjit Singh, Sikh emperor (died 1839)
- 1782 – Esaias Tegnér, Swedish bishop and educator (died 1846)
- 1804 – Theophilus H. Holmes, American general (died 1880)
- 1809 – John A. Dahlgren, American admiral (died 1870)
- 1813 – Petar II Petrović-Njegoš, Montenegrin metropolitan, philosopher, and poet (died 1851)
- 1814 – Joseph Hooker, American general (died 1879)
- 1833 – Edwin Booth, American actor and manager (died 1893)
- 1837 – James T. Rapier, American lawyer and politician (died 1883)
- 1838 – Joseph F. Smith, American religious leader, 6th President of The Church of Jesus Christ of Latter-day Saints (died 1918)
- 1841 – Edward Burd Grubb, Jr., American general and diplomat, United States Ambassador to Spain (died 1913)
- 1847 – Mir Mosharraf Hossain, famous novelist of Bengali literature (died 1912)
- 1848 – Albert I, Prince of Monaco (died 1922)
- 1850 – Robert Louis Stevenson, Scottish novelist, poet, and essayist (died 1894)
- 1853 – John Drew Jr., American actor (died 1927)
- 1854 – George Whitefield Chadwick, American composer and educator (died 1931)
- 1856 – Louis Brandeis, American lawyer and jurist (died 1941)
- 1864 – James Cannon Jr., American Bishop of the Methodist Episcopal Church, South (died 1944),
- 1866 – Abraham Flexner, American educator, founded the Institute for Advanced Study (died 1959)
- 1869 – Helene Stöcker, German author and activist (died 1943)
- 1869 – Ariadna Tyrkova-Williams, Russian-American activist, journalist, and politician (died 1962)
- 1872 – John M. Lyle, Irish-Canadian architect and educator, designed the Royal Alexandra Theatre (died 1945)
- 1878 – Max Dehn, German-American mathematician and academic (died 1952)
- 1879 – John Grieb, American gymnast and triathlete (died 1939)
- 1881 – Jesús García, Mexican railroad brakeman (died 1907)
- 1883 – Leo Goodwin, American swimmer, diver, and water polo player (died 1957)
- 1886 – Mary Wigman, German dancer and choreographer (died 1973)
- 1893 – Edward Adelbert Doisy, American biochemist and academic, Nobel Prize laureate (died 1986)
- 1894 – Bennie Moten, American pianist and bandleader (died 1935)
- 1894 – Arthur Nebe, German SS officer (died 1945)
- 1897 – Gertrude Olmstead, American actress (died 1975)
- 1899 – Iskander Mirza, Pakistani general and politician, 1st President of Pakistan (died 1969)
- 1900 – David Marshall Williams, American convicted murderer and firearms designer (died 1975)
- 1900 – Edward Buzzell, American actor, director, and screenwriter (died 1985)

=== 1901–present ===
- 1904 – H. C. Potter, American director and producer (died 1977)
- 1906 – Hermione Baddeley, English actress (died 1986)
- 1906 – A. W. Mailvaganam, Sri Lankan physicist and academic (died 1987)
- 1906 – Eva Zeisel, Hungarian-American potter and designer (died 2011)
- 1908 – C. Vann Woodward, American historian, author, and academic (died 1999)
- 1909 – Vincent Apap, Maltese sculptor (died 2003)
- 1910 – William Bradford Huie, American journalist and author (died 1986)
- 1910 – Pat Reid, Indian-English soldier and author (died 1990)
- 1911 – Buck O'Neil, American baseball player and manager (died 2006)
- 1913 – V. Appapillai, Sri Lankan physicist and academic (died 2001)
- 1913 – Dimitrios Hatzis, Greek novelist and journalist (died 1981)
- 1913 – Lon Nol, Cambodian general and politician, 37th Prime Minister of Cambodia (died 1985)
- 1914 – Amelia Bence, Argentinian actress (died 2016)
- 1914 – Alberto Lattuada, Italian actor, director, and screenwriter (died 2005)
- 1917 – Vasantdada Patil, Indian farmer and politician, 9th Governor of Rajasthan (died 1989)
- 1917 – Robert Sterling, American actor (died 2006)
- 1918 – George Grant, Canadian philosopher and academic (died 1988)
- 1920 – Guillermina Bravo, Mexican dancer, choreographer, and director (died 2013)
- 1920 – Jack Elam, American actor (died 2003)
- 1921 – Joonas Kokkonen, Finnish pianist and composer (died 1996)
- 1922 – Jack Narz, American game show host and announcer (died 2008)
- 1922 – Oskar Werner, Austrian-German actor (died 1984)
- 1923 – Leonard Boyle, Irish and Canadian medievalist and palaeographer (died 1999)
- 1923 – Linda Christian, Mexican-American actress (died 2011)
- 1924 – Motoo Kimura, Japanese biologist and geneticist (died 1994)
- 1926 – Harry Hughes, American lawyer and politician, 57th Governor of Maryland (died 2019)
- 1927 – Albert Turner Bharucha-Reid, American mathematician and theorist (died 1985)
- 1928 – Helena Carroll, Scottish-American actress (died 2013)
- 1928 – Jack George, American basketball player (died 1989)
- 1928 – Hampton Hawes, American pianist and author (died 1977)
- 1929 – Robert Bonnaud, French historian and academic (died 2013)
- 1929 – Fred Phelps, American lawyer, pastor, and activist, founded the Westboro Baptist Church (died 2014)
- 1929 – Asashio Tarō III, Japanese sumo wrestler, the 46th Yokozuna (died 1988)
- 1930 – Benny Andrews, American painter and academic (died 2006)
- 1930 – Fred R. Harris, American politician (died 2024)
- 1931 – Adrienne Corri, Scottish actress (died 2016)
- 1932 – Richard Mulligan, American actor (died 2000)
- 1933 – Don Lane, American-Australian actor, singer, and television host (died 2009)
- 1933 – Ojārs Vācietis, Latvian author and poet (died 1983)
- 1934 – Peter Arnett, New Zealand-American journalist and academic (died 2025)
- 1934 – Jimmy Fontana, Italian singer-songwriter and actor (died 2013)
- 1934 – Kamahl, Malaysian-Australian singer
- 1934 – Garry Marshall, American actor, director, and producer (died 2016)
- 1935 – George Carey, English archbishop and theologian
- 1936 – Salim Kallas, Syrian actor and politician (died 2013)
- 1937 – Tabu Ley Rochereau, African musician (Orchestre Afrisa International) (died 2013)
- 1938 – Gérald Godin, Canadian journalist, poet, and politician (died 1994)
- 1938 – Jack Rule Jr., American golfer
- 1938 – Jean Seberg, American-French actress and singer (died 1979)
- 1939 – Karel Brückner, Czech footballer and manager
- 1939 – Idris Muhammad, American drummer and composer (died 2014)
- 1940 – Saul Kripke, American philosopher and academic (died 2022)
- 1940 – Baby Washington, American soul singer
- 1941 – Eberhard Diepgen, German lawyer and politician, 10th Mayor of Berlin
- 1941 – David Green, American businessman and philanthropist, founded Hobby Lobby
- 1941 – Dack Rambo, American actor (died 1994)
- 1941 – Mel Stottlemyre, American baseball player and coach (died 2019)
- 1942 – John P. Hammond, American singer-songwriter and guitarist
- 1943 – Roberto Boninsegna, Italian footballer and manager
- 1943 – Jay Sigel, American golfer (died 2025)
- 1943 – Howard Wilkinson, English footballer and manager
- 1944 – Timmy Thomas, American singer-songwriter, keyboard player, and producer (died 2022)
- 1945 – Masahiro Hasemi, Japanese race car driver
- 1945 – Bobby Manuel, American guitarist and producer
- 1945 – Knut Riisnæs, Norwegian saxophonist and composer (died 2023)
- 1946 – Stanisław Barańczak, Polish-American poet, critic, and scholar (died 2014)
- 1946 – Ray Wylie Hubbard, American country singer-songwriter and guitarist
- 1947 – Toy Caldwell, American guitarist and songwriter (died 1993)
- 1947 – Amory Lovins, American physicist and environmentalist
- 1947 – Joe Mantegna, American actor and voice artist
- 1948 – Humayun Ahmed, Bengali popular writer, dramatist, novelist, screenwriter, lyricist and filmmaker (died 2012)
- 1949 – Terry Reid, English singer-songwriter and guitarist (died 2025)
- 1950 – Gilbert Perreault, Canadian ice hockey player and coach
- 1951 – Pini Gershon, Israeli basketball player and coach
- 1951 – Harry Hurt III, American author and journalist
- 1952 – Merrick Garland, American jurist, 86th United States Attorney General
- 1952 – Mark Lye, American golfer
- 1952 – Art Malik, Pakistani-English actor and producer
- 1953 – Andrés Manuel López Obrador, former President of Mexico
- 1953 – Tracy Scoggins, American actress
- 1954 – Scott McNealy, American businessman, co-founded Sun Microsystems
- 1954 – Chris Noth, American actor and producer
- 1955 – Robert Aaron, Canadian jazz musician
- 1955 – Bill Britton, American golfer
- 1955 – Whoopi Goldberg, American actress, comedian, and talk show host
- 1956 – Rex Linn, American actor
- 1956 – Aldo Nova, Canadian singer-songwriter and musician
- 1957 – Greg Abbott, American politician, 48th Governor of Texas
- 1959 – Caroline Goodall, English actress and screenwriter
- 1960 – Neil Flynn, American actor
- 1960 – Teodora Ungureanu, Romanian gymnast and coach
- 1961 – Kim Polese, American entrepreneur and technology executive
- 1963 – Jaime Covilhã, Angolan basketball player and coach
- 1963 – Vinny Testaverde, American football player
- 1964 – Timo Rautiainen, Finnish race car driver
- 1964 – Dan Sullivan, American politician
- 1966 – Susanna Haapoja, Finnish politician (died 2009)
- 1967 – Juhi Chawla, Indian actress, singer, and producer, Miss India 1984
- 1967 – Jimmy Kimmel, American comedian, actor, and talk show host
- 1967 – Steve Zahn, American actor and singer
- 1968 – Pat Hentgen, American baseball player and coach
- 1969 – Ayaan Hirsi Ali, Somali-American activist and author
- 1969 – Patrik Augusta, Czech ice hockey player
- 1969 – Gerard Butler, Scottish actor
- 1969 – Nico Motchebon, German runner
- 1972 – Takuya Kimura, Japanese singer
- 1972 – Samantha Riley, Australian swimmer
- 1973 – David Auradou, French rugby player
- 1973 – Jordan Bridges, American actor
- 1973 – Ari Hoenig, American drummer and composer
- 1974 – Carl Hoeft, New Zealand rugby player
- 1974 – Indrek Zelinski, Estonian footballer and manager
- 1975 – Tom Compernolle, Belgian runner (died 2008)
- 1975 – Alain Digbeu, French basketball player
- 1975 – Ivica Dragutinović, Serbian footballer
- 1975 – Aisha Hinds, American actress
- 1975 – Quim, Portuguese footballer
- 1975 – Toivo Suursoo, Estonian ice hockey player and coach
- 1976 – Janine Leal, Venezuelan nutritionist, television presenter and model.
- 1976 – Kelly Sotherton, English sprinter and long jumper
- 1976 – Hiroshi Tanahashi, Japanese wrestler
- 1977 – Zulfiqer Russell, Bangladeshi journalist and lyricist
- 1977 – Huang Xiaoming, Chinese actor and singer
- 1978 – Nikolai Fraiture, American bass player
- 1979 – Kick, Japanese comedian and screenwriter
- 1979 – Subliminal, Israeli rapper and producer
- 1980 – Monique Coleman, American actress, singer, and dancer
- 1980 – Sara Del Rey, American wrestler and trainer
- 1980 – Juraj Kolník, Slovak ice hockey player
- 1980 – François-Louis Tremblay, Canadian speed skater
- 1981 – Ryan Bertin, American wrestler and coach
- 1981 – Rivkah, American author and illustrator
- 1982 – Michael Copon, American actor, singer, and producer
- 1982 – Samkon Gado, Nigerian-American football player
- 1982 – Kumi Koda, Japanese singer-songwriter and actress
- 1983 – Kalle Kriit, Estonian cyclist
- 1983 – Maleli Kunavore, Fijian rugby player (died 2012)
- 1984 – Lucas Barrios, Paraguayan footballer
- 1984 – Kurt Morath, Tongan rugby player
- 1985 – Asdrúbal Cabrera, Venezuelan baseball player
- 1986 – Kevin Bridges, Scottish comedian and actor
- 1986 – Wade Miley, American baseball player
- 1987 – Hatsune Matsushima, Japanese model and actress
- 1987 – Dana Vollmer, American swimmer
- 1990 – Brenden Dillon, Canadian ice hockey player
- 1991 – Matt Bennett, American actor
- 1992 – Grégory Hofmann, Swiss ice hockey player
- 1992 – Shabazz Muhammad, American basketball player
- 1993 – Julia Michaels, American singer and songwriter
- 1995 – Oliver Stummvoll, Austrian model
- 1995 – Lucy Fallon, English actress
- 1999 – Brett Baty, American baseball player
- 1999 – Lando Norris, British-Belgian race car driver
- 2000 – Sydney Agudong, American actress and singer
- 2002 – Emma Raducanu, British tennis player
- 2002 – Giovanni Reyna, American soccer player
- 2005 – Leny Yoro, French footballer

== Deaths ==
=== Pre-1600 ===
- 867 – Pope Nicholas I (born 800)
- 1002 – Pallig, Danish chieftain, Jarl of Devonshire
- 1002 – Gunhilde, wife of Pallig, Danish chieftain
- 1004 – Abbo of Fleury, French monk and saint (born 945)
- 1072 – Adalbero III of Luxembourg (born c. 1010)
- 1093 – Malcolm III of Scotland (born 1031)
- 1143 – Fulk, King of Jerusalem (born 1089)
- 1154 – Iziaslav II of Kiev, Prince of Vladimir and Volyn, (born c. 1097)
- 1175 – Henry of France, Archbishop of Reims (born c.1121)
- 1299 – Oliver Sutton, Bishop of Lincoln
- 1319 – Eric VI of Denmark (born 1274)
- 1345 – Constance of Peñafiel, queen of Pedro I of Portugal (born 1323)
- 1359 – Ivan II of Moscow (born 1326)
- 1369 – Thomas de Beauchamp, 11th Earl of Warwick
- 1432 – Anne of Burgundy, duchess of Bedford (born 1404)
- 1440 – Joan Beaufort, Countess of Westmoreland
- 1460 – Prince Henry the Navigator, Portuguese patron of exploration (born 1394)
- 1502 – Annio da Viterbo, Italian friar, historian, and scholar (born 1432)

=== 1601–1900 ===
- 1606 – Girolamo Mercuriale, Italian physician and philologist (born 1530)
- 1619 – Ludovico Carracci, Italian painter and illustrator (born 1555)
- 1650 – Thomas May, English poet and historian (born 1595)
- 1726 – Sophia Dorothea of Celle, Electoral Princess of Hanover, Duchess of Ahlden (born 1666)
- 1770 – George Grenville, English lawyer and politician, Prime Minister of Great Britain (born 1712)
- 1771 – Konrad Ernst Ackermann, German actor (born 1712)
- 1777 – William Bowyer, English printer and author (born 1699)
- 1862 – Ludwig Uhland, German poet, philologist, and historian (born 1787)
- 1863 – Ignacio Comonfort, Mexican soldier and politician. President 1855–1858 (born 1812)
- 1867 – Adolphe Napoléon Didron, French archaeologist and historian (born 1806)
- 1868 – Gioachino Rossini, Italian pianist and composer (born 1792)
- 1872 – Margaret Sarah Carpenter, English painter (born 1793)
- 1883 – J. Marion Sims, American physician and gynecologist (born 1813)

=== 1901–present ===
- 1903 – Camille Pissarro, Virgin Islander-French painter (born 1830)
- 1911 – Cecilie Thoresen Krog, Norwegian women's rights pioneer (born 1858)
- 1921 – Ignác Goldziher, Hungarian scholar of Islam (born 1850)
- 1929 – Princess Viktoria of Prussia (born 1866)
- 1932 – Francisco Lagos Cházaro, acting president of Mexico (1915) (born 1878)
- 1937 – Mrs. Leslie Carter, American actress (born 1857)
- 1942 – Daniel J. Callaghan, American admiral (born 1890)
- 1952 – Margaret Wise Brown, American author (born 1910)
- 1954 – Paul Ludwig Ewald von Kleist, German field marshal (born 1881)
- 1955 – Dida Dederding, Danish doctor and academic (born 1889)
- 1955 – Bernard DeVoto, American historian and author (born 1897)
- 1955 – Moshe Pesach, Greek rabbi (born 1869)
- 1961 – Anthony Joseph Drexel Biddle, Jr., American general and diplomat, United States Ambassador to Czechoslovakia (born 1897)
- 1963 – Margaret Murray, Indian-English anthropologist and author (born 1863)
- 1969 – Iskander Mirza, Indian-Pakistani general and politician, 1st President of Pakistan (born 1899)
- 1970 – Bessie Braddock, British politician (born 1899)
- 1973 – Lila Lee, American actress (born 1901)
- 1973 – Bruno Maderna, Italian-German conductor and composer (born 1920)
- 1974 – Vittorio De Sica, Italian-French actor, director, and screenwriter (born 1901)
- 1974 – Karen Silkwood, American technician and activist (born 1946)
- 1975 – Olga Bergholz, Russian poet and playwright (born 1910)
- 1979 – Dimitris Psathas, Greek playwright and academic (born 1907)
- 1982 – Hugues Lapointe, Canadian lawyer and politician, 15th Solicitor General of Canada (born 1911)
- 1983 – Henry Jamison Handy, American swimmer and water polo player (born 1886)
- 1983 – Junior Samples, American comedian and actor (born 1926)
- 1986 – Franco Cortese, Italian race car driver (born 1903)
- 1988 – Antal Doráti, Hungarian-American conductor and composer (born 1906)
- 1988 – Jaromír Vejvoda, Czech composer (born 1902)
- 1989 – Victor Davis, Canadian swimmer (born 1964)
- 1989 – Franz Joseph II, Prince of Liechtenstein (born 1906)
- 1989 – Rohana Wijeweera, Sri Lankan rebel and politician (born 1943)
- 1989 – Dorothea Krook-Gilead, Latvian-South African author, translator and scholar (born 1920)
- 1990 – Helen Dettweiler, American golfer (born 1914)
- 1991 – Paul-Émile Léger, Canadian cardinal (born 1904)
- 1993 – Rufus R. Jones, American wrestler (born 1933)
- 1994 – Jack Baker, American actor and screenwriter (born 1947)
- 1994 – Motoo Kimura, Japanese biologist and geneticist (born 1924)
- 1996 – Bill Doggett, American pianist and composer (born 1916)
- 1996 – Bobbie Vaile, Australian astrophysicist and academic (born 1959)
- 1997 – André Boucourechliev, Bulgarian-French pianist and composer (born 1925)
- 1998 – Edwige Feuillère, French actress (born 1907)
- 1998 – Valerie Hobson, Irish-born English actress (born 1917)
- 1998 – Red Holzman, American basketball player and coach (born 1920)
- 2001 – Cornelius Warmerdam, American pole vaulter (born 1915)
- 2002 – Juan Alberto Schiaffino, Uruguayan footballer and manager (born 1925)
- 2002 – Rishikesh Shaha, Nepalese academic and politician (born 1925)
- 2004 – John Balance, English singer-songwriter (born 1962)
- 2004 – Ol' Dirty Bastard, American rapper and producer (born 1968)
- 2004 – Thomas M. Foglietta, American lawyer and politician, United States Ambassador to Italy (born 1928)
- 2005 – Vine Deloria, Jr., American historian, theologian, and author (born 1933)
- 2005 – Eddie Guerrero, American wrestler (born 1967)
- 2007 – Wahab Akbar, Filipino lawyer and politician (born 1960)
- 2007 – John Doherty, English footballer and manager (born 1935)
- 2007 – Kazuhisa Inao, Japanese baseball player and manager (born 1937)
- 2010 – Luis García Berlanga, Spanish director and screenwriter (born 1921)
- 2010 – Allan Sandage, American astronomer and cosmologist (born 1926)
- 2012 – Erazm Ciołek, Polish photographer and author (born 1937)
- 2012 – Manuel Peña Escontrela, Spanish footballer (born 1965)
- 2012 – John Sheridan, English rugby player and coach (born 1933)
- 2013 – Hans-Jürgen Heise, German author and poet (born 1930)
- 2013 – Chieko Aioi, Japanese actress and voice actress (born 1934)
- 2014 – María José Alvarado, Honduran model, Señorita Honduras 2014 (born 1995)
- 2014 – Kakha Bendukidze, Georgian economist and politician, Georgian Minister of Economy (born 1956)
- 2014 – Alvin Dark, American baseball player and manager (born 1922)
- 2014 – Alexander Grothendieck, German-French mathematician and theorist (born 1928)
- 2016 – Leon Russell, American singer-songwriter (born 1942)
- 2017 – Bobby Doerr, American baseball player and manager (born 1918)
- 2020 – Peter Sutcliffe, English serial killer (born 1946)
- 2024 – Theodore Olson, American lawyer (born 1940)
- 2024 – Shel Talmy, American record producer, songwriter and arranger (born 1937)
- 2024 – Shuntarō Tanikawa, Japanese poet and translator (born 1931)
- 2024 – Daim Zainuddin, Malaysian politician (born 1938)
- 2025 – Juan Ponce Enrile, Filipino politician and lawyer (born 1924)

== Holidays and observances ==
- Christian feast day:
  - Agostina Livia Pietrantoni
  - Arcadius and companions
  - Brice of Tours
  - Eugenius II of Toledo
  - Frances Xavier Cabrini
  - Homobonus
  - Imerius of Immertal
  - John Chrysostom (Eastern Orthodox, Repose)
  - Maxellende of Caudry
  - Quintian of Rodez
  - Blessed Peter Vitchev
  - Pope Nicholas I
  - Saints of the Benedictine family
  - Saints of the Premonstratensian Order
  - Charles Simeon (Church of England)
  - The Hundred Thousand Martyrs of Tbilisi (Georgian Orthodox Church)
- Sadie Hawkins Day (United States)
- World Kindness Day
