= 1002 =

Calendar year

1002 in various calendars
- Gregorian calendar: 1002; MII
- Ab urbe condita: 1755
- Armenian calendar: 451; ԹՎ ՆԾԱ
- Assyrian calendar: 5752
- Balinese saka calendar: 923–924
- Bengali calendar: 408–409
- Berber calendar: 1952
- English Regnal year: N/A
- Buddhist calendar: 1546
- Burmese calendar: 364
- Byzantine calendar: 6510–6511
- Chinese calendar: 辛丑年 (Metal Ox); 3699 or 3492 — to — 壬寅年 (Water Tiger); 3700 or 3493
- Coptic calendar: 718–719
- Discordian calendar: 2168
- Ethiopian calendar: 994–995
- Hebrew calendar: 4762–4763
- Hindu calendars
- Vikram Samvat: 1058–1059
- Shaka Samvat: 923–924
- Kali Yuga: 4102–4103
- Holocene calendar: 11002
- Igbo calendar: 2–3
- Iranian calendar: 380–381
- Islamic calendar: 392–393
- Japanese calendar: Chōhō 4 (長保４年)
- Javanese calendar: 904–905
- Julian calendar: 1002; MII
- Korean calendar: 3335
- Minguo calendar: 910 before ROC 民前910年
- Nanakshahi calendar: −466
- Seleucid era: 1313/1314 AG
- Thai solar calendar: 1544–1545
- Tibetan calendar: ལྕགས་མོ་གླང་ལོ་ (female Iron-Ox); 1128 or 747 or −25 — to — ཆུ་ཕོ་སྟག་ལོ་ (male Water-Tiger); 1129 or 748 or −24

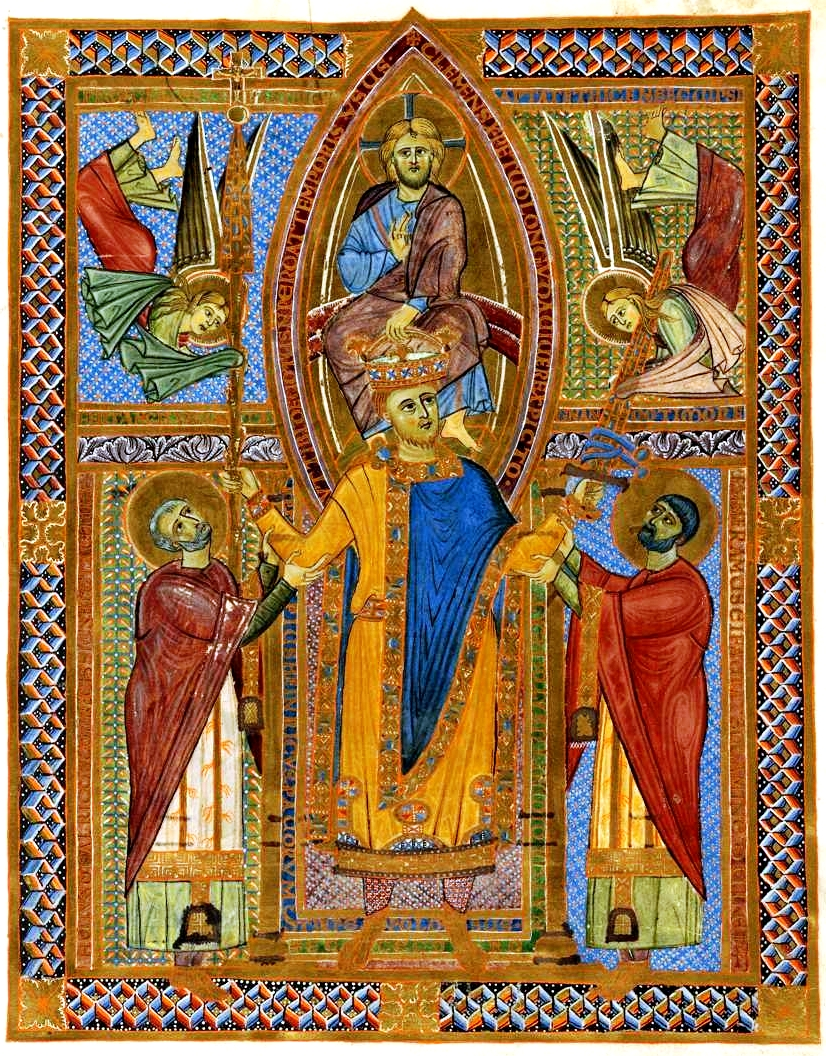
Henry II is crowned as King of Germany.

Year 1002 (MII) was a common year starting on Thursday of the Julian calendar.

== Events ==
=== By place ===
==== Europe ====
- January 23 – Emperor Otto III dies, at the age of 22, of smallpox at Castle of Paterno (near Rome) after a 19-year reign. He leaves no son, nor a surviving brother who can succeed by hereditary right to the throne. Otto is buried in Aachen Cathedral alongside the body of Charlemagne.
- February 15 – At an assembly at Pavia of Lombard nobles and secondi milites (the minor nobles), Arduin of Ivrea (grandson of former King Berengar II) is restored to his domains and crowned as King of Italy in the Basilica of San Michele Maggiore. Arduin is supported by Arnulf II, archbishop of Milan.
- June 7 – Henry II, a cousin of Otto III, is elected and crowned as King of Germany by Archbishop Willigis at Mainz. Henry does not recognise the coronation of Arduin. Otto of Worms withdraws his nomination for the title of Holy Roman Emperor and receives the Duchy of Carinthia (modern Austria) - Henry is the first King to be elected away from the Cathedral of Aachen since the tradition was begun by Otto I in 936.
- July – Battle of Calatañazor: Christian armies led by Alfonso V of León, Sancho III of Pamplona and Sancho García of Castile, defeat the invading Saracens under Al-Mansur, the de facto ruler of Al-Andalus.
- August 8 – Al-Mansur dies after a 24-year reign and is succeeded by his son Abd al-Malik al-Muzaffar as ruler (hajib) of the Umayyad Caliphate of Córdoba (modern Spain).
- October 15 – Henry I, duke of Burgundy, dies and is succeeded by his stepson, Otto-William. He inherits the duchy; this is disputed by King Robert II of France ("the Pious").
- Fall – A revolt organized by Bohemian nobles of the rivalling Vršovci clan, forces Duke Boleslaus III ("the Red") to flee to Germany. He is succeeded by Vladivoj (until 1003).

==== British Isles ====
- November 13 – St. Brice's Day massacre: King Æthelred the Unready orders all Danes in England killed. Æthelred marries (as his second wife) Emma, daughter of Duke Richard I of Normandy.
- Winter – Æthelred pays tribute (or Danegeld) to Sweyn Forkbeard, buying him off with a massive payment of 24,000 lbs of silver to hold off further Viking raids against England.
- Brian Boru, king of Leinster and Munster, becomes High King of Ireland. After the submission of Máel Sechnaill mac Domnaill, Brian Boru makes an expedition to the North.

==== Persia ====
- Winter – Khalaf ibn Ahmad, Saffarid emir of Sistan (modern Iran), is deposed and surrenders to the Ghaznavid dynasty after a 39-year reign (approximate date).

==== Asia ====
- In Japan, court lady Sei Shōnagon completes writing The Pillow Book.

=== By topic ===
==== Religion ====
- June – Frederick, archbishop of Ravenna, is sent as an imperial legate to the Synod of Pöhlde, to mediate between the claims of Bishop Bernward of Hildesheim and Willigis, concerning the control of Gandersheim Abbey.

== Births ==
- May 10 – Al-Khatib al-Baghdadi, Muslim scholar (d. 1071)
- June 21 – Leo IX, pope of the Catholic Church (d. 1054)
- Airlangga, ruler (rajah) of Kahuripan (Indonesia) (d. 1049)
- Adolf II of Lotharingia, German nobleman (d. 1041)
- Alice of Normandy, countess of Burgundy (d. 1038)
- Aristakes Lastivertsi, Armenian historian (d. 1080)
- George I, king of Georgia (approximate date)
- Mei Yaochen, poet of the Song dynasty (d. 1060)
- Nikephoros III, Byzantine emperor (d. 1081)

== Deaths ==
- January 8 – Wulfsige III, bishop of Sherborne
- January 23 – Otto III, Holy Roman Emperor (b. 980)
- April 23 – Æscwig, bishop of Dorchester
- April 30 – Eckard I, margrave of Meissen
- May 6 – Ealdwulf, archbishop of York
- August 8 – Al-Mansur, Umayyad vizier and de facto ruler (b. 938)
- October 15 – Henry I, duke of Burgundy (b. 946)
- November 13
  - Gunhilde, Danish princess and noblewoman
  - Pallig, Danish chieftain (jarl) of Devonshire
- Athanasius IV, Syrian patriarch of Antioch
- Dominic, archbishop of Esztergom
- Gisela, French princess (approximate date)
- Godfrey I (the Prisoner), Frankish nobleman
- John the Iberian, Georgian monk (approximate date)
- Kisai Marvazi, Persian author and poet (b. 953)
- Rogneda of Polotsk, Grand Princess of Kiev (b. 962)
- Sa'id al-Dawla, Hamdanid emir of Aleppo (Syria)
- Sancho Ramírez, king of Viguera (approximate date)
