= Vindicianus =

Bishop of Cambrai-Arras

Saint Vindicianus
- Born: c. 632 AD; Bullecourt
- Died: c. 712 AD
- Venerated in: Roman Catholic Church; Eastern Orthodox Church
- Feast: 11 March

Saint Vindicianus (Vindician) (French: Vindicien) (c. 632 – 712) was a bishop of Cambrai-Arras. His feast day is 11 March. He is called a spiritual follower of Saint Eligius (Saint Eloi).

== Life ==
Traditionally, his birthplace is given as Bullecourt, near Bapaume. This is the birthplace indicated in the documents dating much later than the saint's death, but which claim to reproduce an ancient local tradition. Nothing is known of his early years.

On the death of St. Aubert, Bishop of Cambrai-Arras (about 668), Vindicianus was elected his successor. He was bishop of this see in the reign of Theuderic III of Neustria (about 673).

In 673 Vindicianus supervised the translation of the body of St. Maxellende to Caudry. In the same year he consecrated the monastery of Honnecourt-sur-Escaut, which was given in 685 to St. Bertin. In 675 he signed a charter of donation in favour of the abbey at Maroilles, rendered illustrious by St. Humbert (Emebertus). In the same year he consecrated the church at Hasnon. He was probably in relation with St. Arnaud of Tongeren, since his signature appears on the latter's testament in 679. In 681 he claimed for his diocese the honour of possessing the body of St. Léger, but he did not succeed, the remains of St. Léger being confided to Ansoald, Bishop of Poitiers.

His predecessor, St. Aubert of Cambrai, had founded the Abbey of Saint-Vaast, the building of which he had been unable to complete; Vindicianus finished it, apparently in 682, and placed it temporalities under the protection of Thierry III, who conferred numerous gifts on the monastery. In 685 a certain Hatta was placed at its head by Vindicianus.

In the following year Vindicianusr dedicated the church at Hamaye-les-Marchienne, and acted at the exhumation of the bodies of Sts. Eusebia and Gertrude of Hamage, who had been abbesses of the monastery of that name.

The events of his life after this date (686) are unknown. The first recorded reference to Brussels ("Brosella") in 695 is attributed to him. He died about 695 and was buried at Ecoivres wood on Mont-Saint-Éloi. The region was ravaged by the Normans in the ninth century, and on more than one occasion the relics of the saint were in danger, until in 1030 Bishop Gerard I of Cambrai had his body removed to the episcopal city. After having been at Douai and Arras, the relics were returned to Mont-St-Eloi in 1453. After still further translations, especially in 1598 and 1601, the body was finally placed in the cathedral at Arras.

== See also ==
- Saint Vindicianus, patron saint archive
