= Viking Apocalypse =

- Directed by: Stuart Elliott
- Presented by: Britt Baille
- Original languages: English; Hindi; Bengali

Production
- Production location: England
- Production company: National Geographic

Original release
- Network: National Geographic Channel

Viking Apocalypse is a TV program on the National Geographic Channel. The show examines the Ridgeway Hill Viking burial pit in Weymouth, UK, a site of a suspected mass execution long ago. As they begin digging, archaeologists discover many male Viking skulls and search for clues that may reveal why Weymouth would have been a site for these beheadings.
