= Aubert of Cambrai =

Merovingian bishop and Frankish saint

Saint Aubert of Cambrai
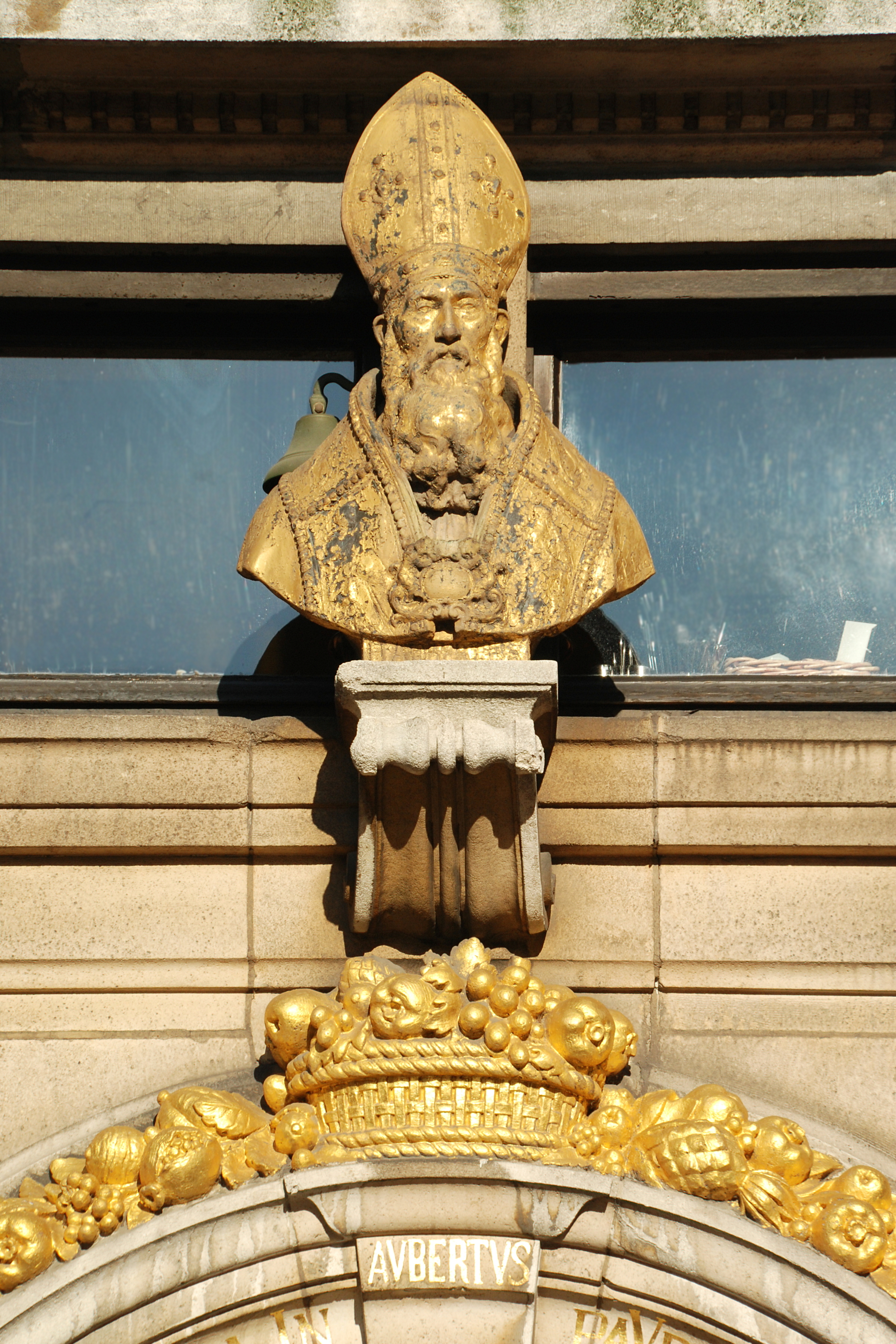

Bishop of Cambrai; Bishop of Arras
- Born: Aubert c. 600 AD; Haucourt-en-Cambresis, Austrasia, Francia
- Died: c. 668-669 AD; Cambrai, Austrasia, Francia
- Feast: 13 December

Aubert of Cambrai (French: Aubert de Cambrai) or Aubertus was a Merovingian Bishop of Cambrai and Arras and a Frankish saint.

== Biography ==
Aubert of Cambrai was born around c. 600 AD in Austrasia, Francia.

Aubert was consecrated as the bishop of the united sees of Arras and Cambrai on 24 March 633 AD. He succeeded Aldebert, bishop of Cambrai-Arras.

Bishop Aubert promoted religion and the study of holy texts in Hainaut and Flanders. Through his influence, many nobles were Christianized, and King Dagobert became a major supporter of the Christian Church. St. Landelin was entrusted to his care and was educated in learning and piety by St. Aubert. The bishop of Cambrai gave his benediction to St. Ghislain and blessed his hermitage (now Saint-Ghislain) on the Haine in the pagus Hainoensis. St. Aubert bestowed the religious habit upon Count of Hainaut Vincent Madelgarius, his wife Saint Waltrude, and her sister St. Aldegundis. Aldegundis was admitted to the vows of a nun by St. Aubert of Cambrai and St. Amandus of Maestricht before becoming the first abbess of Maubeuge Abbey. Aubert built himself many churches and several abbeys, including in Hautmont, in 652 AD. After Witger, Count of Condat, died as a monk at Lobbes Abbey, Bishop Aubert bestowed the veil of widowhood upon St. Amalberga.

Aubert of Cambrai, alongside St. Eligius of Noyon, arrived 30 days after St. Fursey's death to exhume his body for his canonization around 655-658 AD. Bishop Aubert performed the translation of the relics of St. Vedast at Arras in 666 AD.

== Death ==
Bishop Aubert died around c. 668-669 AD in Cambrai, Austrasia, Francia. He was buried in St. Peter Church.

Serving as bishop for 36 years, he was succeeded by Vindicianus upon his death. His shrine was kept in a Cambrai abbey of canons regular, established in 1066. His feast day is celebrated on 13 December.
