= Ridgeway Hill Viking burial pit =

Mass grave in Dorset, England

- Location within Dorset
- 50°40′16″N 2°27′58″W
- Type: Burial pit
- Periods: Early medieval
- Cultures: Viking
- Location: Weymouth, Dorset

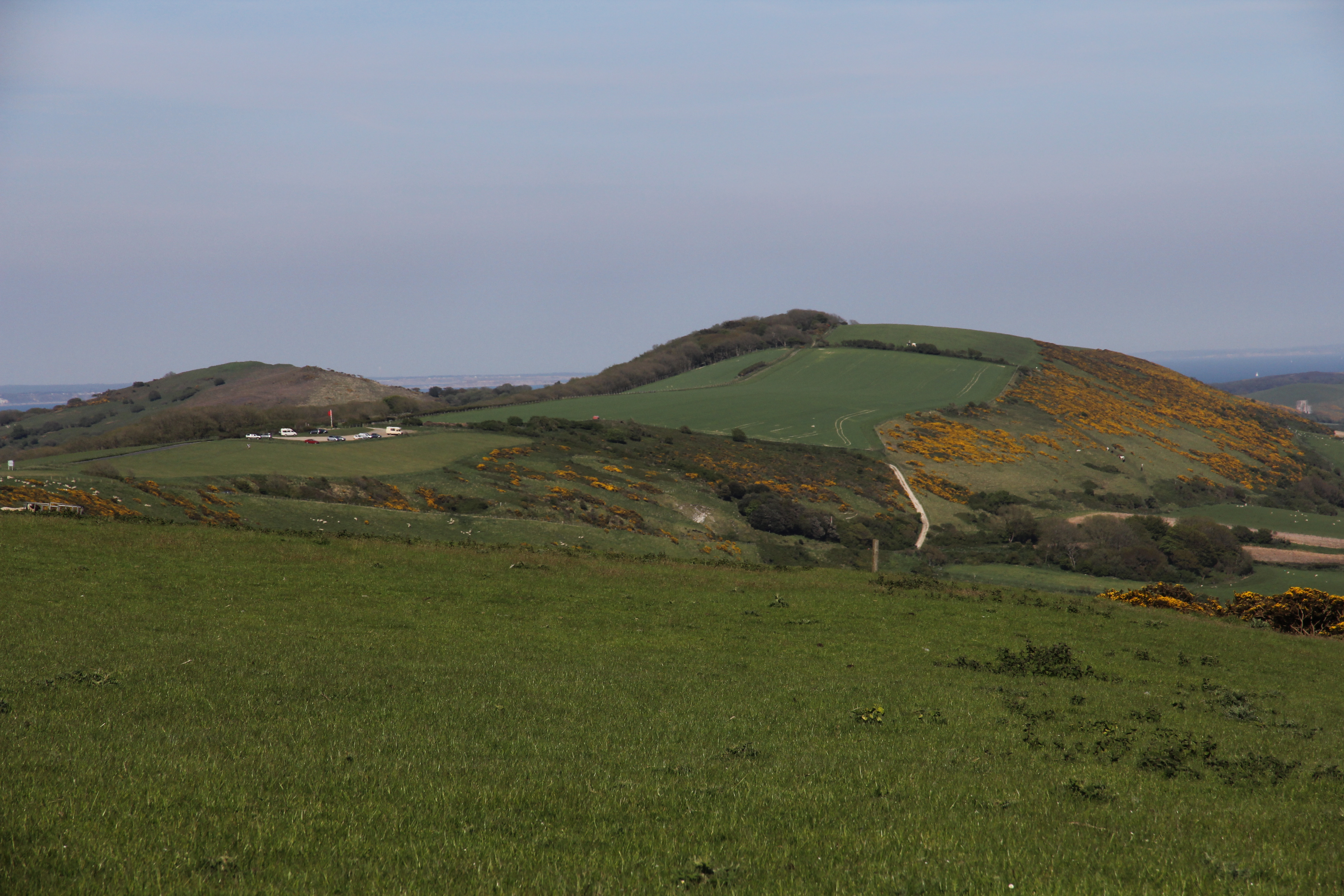
Ridgeway Hill seen from Povington Hill picnic area, Dorset. (Bermicourt, 2013)

The Ridgeway Hill Viking burial pit at Ridgeway Hill near Weymouth, Dorset, was a mass grave of 54 skeletons, including 51 skulls, of Scandinavian men executed some time between AD 970 and 1025. The men are believed to have been Vikings executed by local Anglo-Saxons. The dismembered skeletons were discovered by archaeologists in June 2009, and their identity and approximate ages were later confirmed by forensic analyses. Although the immediate circumstances of the deaths is unknown, the event occurred at a time of conflict between the native Anglo-Saxons and Viking invaders, and it has been suggested that the Vikings had been captured during an attempted raid into Anglo-Saxon territory. There is a possibility it could be linked to the St. Brice's Day massacre order of 1002. It is suggested that the 'Oxford Massacre' was not an isolated incident and could have been part of a kingdom-wide order to eradicate the Vikings.

== Discovery of burial site ==
In September 2008, archaeologists from Oxford Archaeology began excavating land along the route of the planned Weymouth Relief Road (A354 road) in advance of the £87 million project, which was intended to improve access to Weymouth and the Isle of Portland in advance of the 2012 Summer Olympics sailing events held in Weymouth. The project had attracted significant controversy, as the road's route passes through a legally protected Area of Outstanding Natural Beauty that is of historical and ecological importance. The archaeological investigation was one of the largest carried out in Dorset for many years, covering an area of around 50,000 square metres (540,000 sq ft).

The archaeologists discovered a burial pit on Ridgeway Hill containing what turned out to be 54 dismembered skeletons and 51 skulls. The bodies had been thrown into the pit haphazardly but the severed heads had been piled up separately to one side. The pit was in a disused Roman quarry, used by the killers for convenience rather than specially dug for the purpose. It lay next to what was a main road and parish boundary in Anglo-Saxon times; such prominent locations were typically used for public executions. As the burial pit was just outside the main construction area for the relief road, the archaeologists were able to excavate it in detail over the course of three months without significantly disrupting the road project.

== Identifying the dead ==
The 54 skeletons were all of males, almost all aged from their late teens to around 25 years old, with a handful of older individuals aged up to their fifties. They had all been killed at the same time with a large, very sharp weapon such as a sword. They had not been cleanly killed, as many of them had suffered multiple blows to the vertebrae, jawbones and skulls. One man had his hands sliced through, suggesting that he had attempted to grab the sword as it was being swung towards him. There were a total of 188 wounds visible on the skeletons, an average of four per individual, indicating that they had been the victims of severe violence before being killed. One man had the top of his skull sliced off, exposing his brain. There may well have been more injuries to soft tissue, but this is not detectable from the skeletons. However, they had no obvious battle wounds and were most likely captives. Judging from the lack of any remains of clothing or other possessions, they had probably been naked when they were thrown into the pit. There are more bodies than skulls, suggesting that three of the heads – perhaps of high-ranking individuals – were kept as souvenirs or put on stakes.

The executions were initially thought to have occurred around the time of the Roman conquest of Britain circa AD 43, but radiocarbon dating of the remains found that they dated to some time between AD 970 to 1025. An analysis of teeth from ten of the skeletons was carried out by the NERC Isotope Geosciences Laboratory, part of the British Geological Survey. This found that the men had come from Scandinavia, with one thought to have come from north of the Arctic Circle, and had eaten a high protein diet comparable with human remains found at known sites in Sweden.

Chemical evidence from the bones indicated that they had eaten diets of mixed geographical origins, suggesting that they had migrated around northern Europe. Their physical features were also very similar to Scandinavian populations of the time and the physique of some of them indicated that they were possibly warriors. One man had filed grooves into his front central upper incisors, a possible indication of warrior status that has been observed in Scandinavian burials. However, the men were not all in good physical condition. One had suffered from a painful and disabling suppurating leg wound since childhood, which would have significantly slowed him and his group. Another had a deformed right leg as a result of a fractured femur.

== Explanations for the executions ==
The dead men were all of fighting age and were killed a long way from home. Several theories have been advanced for how they ended up at Ridgeway Hill. At the time of their deaths, England was the scene of conflict between native Saxons and invading Vikings. It was initially suggested that the men might have been Saxons killed by Vikings or by other Saxons, but this was disproved by the evidence of their Scandinavian origins. The site of the burial is thought to have been a formal spot, and it is possible the execution may have taken place in front of an audience. In the National Geographic documentary Viking Apocalypse, Dr Britt Baillie has suggested that the executions may have been linked to the St. Brice's Day massacre, a frenzied mass killing, or that the Viking men were executed by their own kind for defection. The crudeness of the execution and the large number of victims indicate it was not carried out by trained executioners.
