= Maxellende of Caudry =

Saint Maxellende
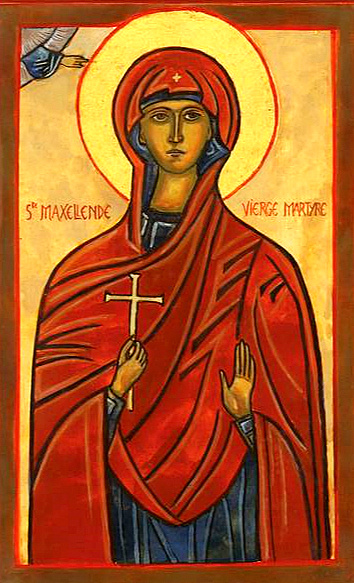
- Born: ~ 650; Caudry
- Died: ~ 670; Caudry
- Honored in: Caudry
- Canonized: 673 by Saint Vindicianus (Vindician; c. 632 – 712) - bishop of Cambrai-Arras.
- Feast: 13th of November, or the following Sunday.
- Patronage: Ocular diseases

Saint Maxellende (c. 650 - 13 November 670) was the thaumaturgist saint martyr of Caudry. Traditionally, she is associated with the diocese of Cambrai, and is invoked for relief from ocular diseases.

== Martyr ==
Maxellende's martyrdom occurred during the Merovingian period, under the episcopate of Vindicien, bishop of Arras and Cambrai. She was the daughter of Huinlinus, a wealthy landowner from Caudry. Her legend holds that she was promised to Harduin d'Armeval, future lord of Solesmes. She resisted the prospective marriage because of her religious commitment, which led Harduin to kill her in 670, and after which he was blinded.

She was buried in the Saint-Souplet church. A few years later, her bones were brought back to Caudry during a procession that Harduin attended. Bursting into tears, he miraculously recovered his sight. Her bones became relics kept in Cambrai, then in Le Cateau-Cambresis, and finally in Caudry. She was revered in the Middle Ages. She is the patroness of the Caudresians and the visually impaired.

== Basilica ==
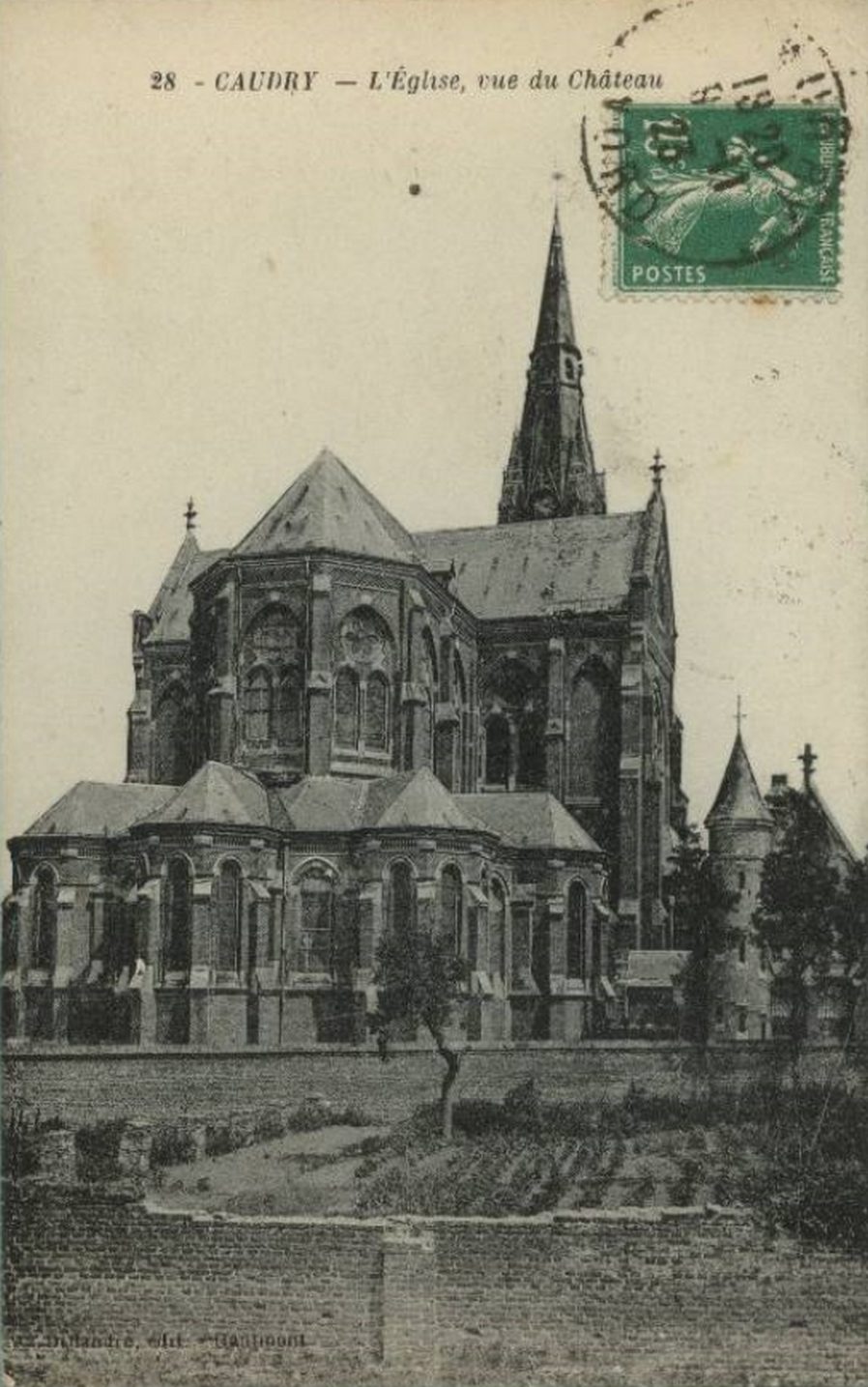
Caudry - Basilica of Saint-Maxellende in 1923 (Ending in 2017)

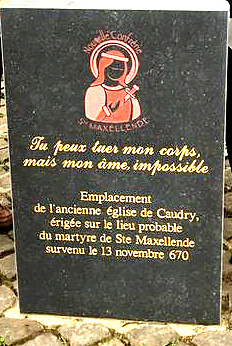
Stele of Saint-Maxellende in Caudry (2010s)

The church is dedicated to Saint Maxellende. A place of pilgrimage for the blind and partially sighted, the church was raised to the rank of minor basilica by the pontifical brief on September 3, 1991.

Construction began in the 1830s and was finished according to Lille architect Louis Cordonnier's Gothic-style plans (1887–1890). It is 72 meters long and its bell tower is 75 meters high with a 3-bell carillon. Inside, the large nave culminates at 20 meters under the keystone, and the two aisles at 8 meters. The transept ends with two chapels, the left-side is dedicated to Our Lady of the Rosary while the right-side holds a shrine dedicated to Saint-Maxellende herself. It is lit by two rosettes, each with 4,600 pieces of glass laid around 1921.

The choir is adorned with a high altar in white marble, gilded copper and mosaics awarded at the 19th century exhibition of high altars in Antwerp.

A plethora of other elements also contributes to the wealth of this sanctuary including:

- Master Charles Lorin's stained glasses made in Chartres (1905–1946)
- Charles Mutin Cavaillé Coll's Great Organ (1913);
- The Shrine of Saint-Maxellende (14th century), classified as an Historic Monument.

Her feast day is celebrated on November 13, or the following Sunday, according to the traditional date of her murder.

== Gallery ==
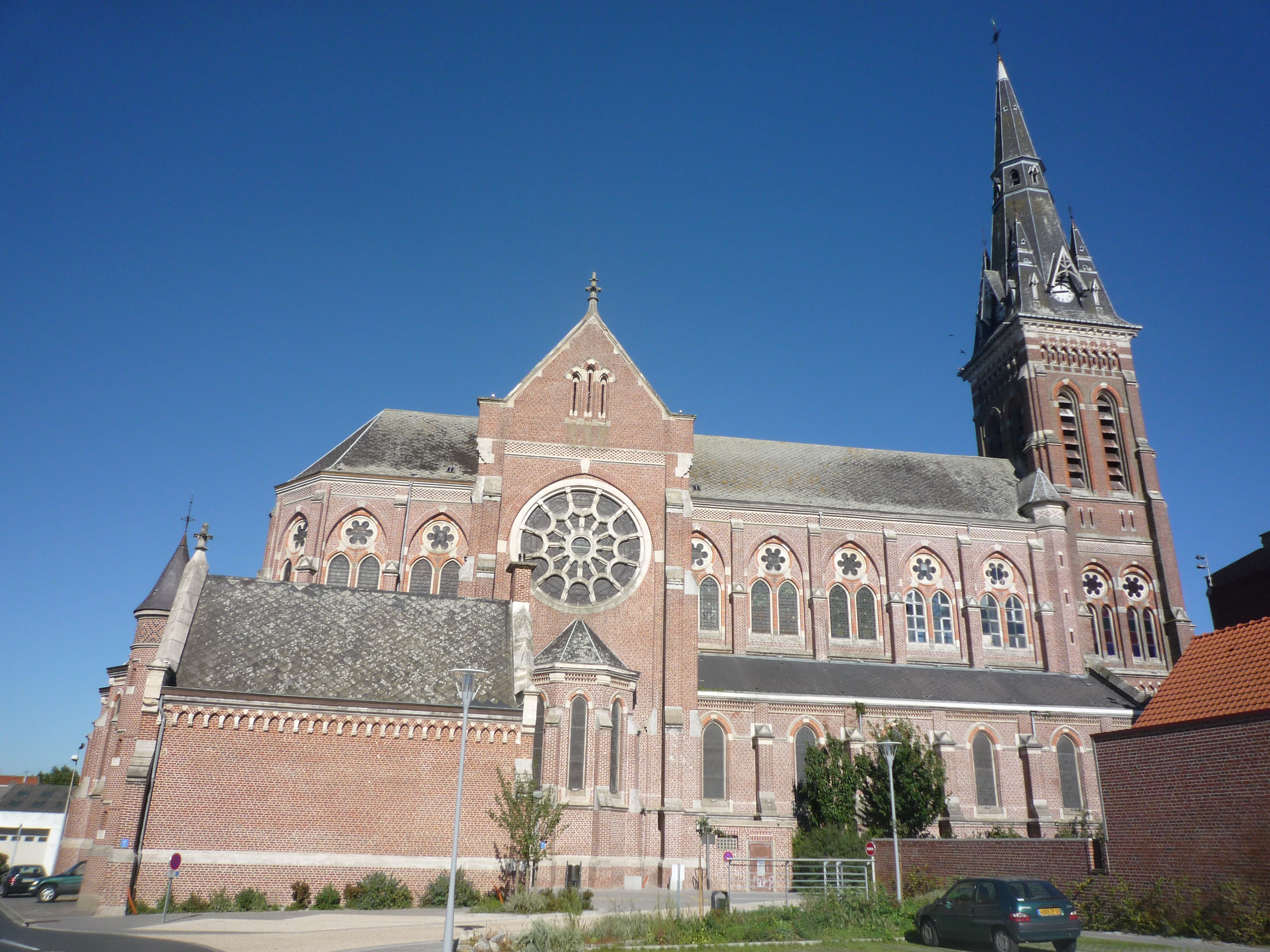

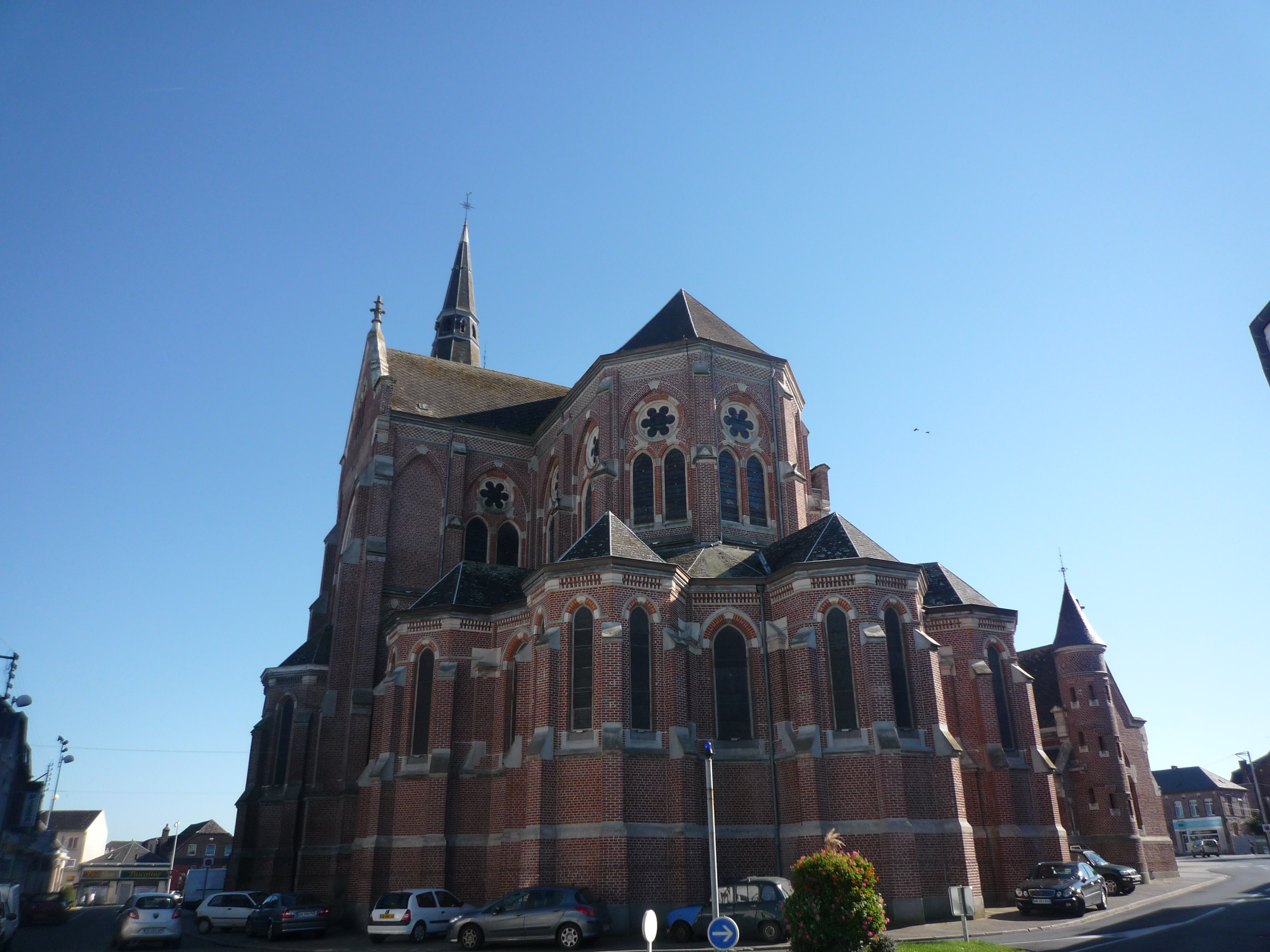

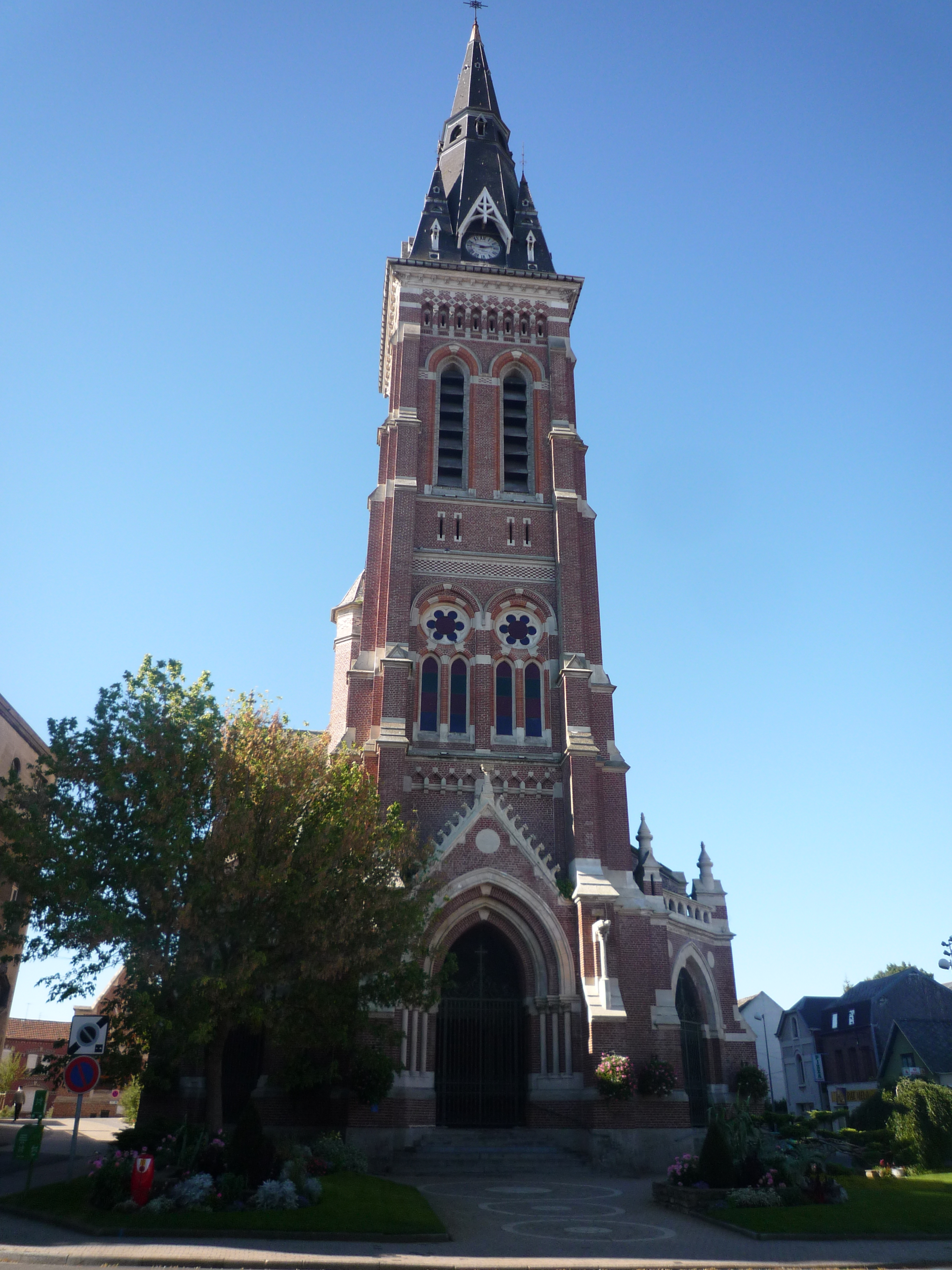

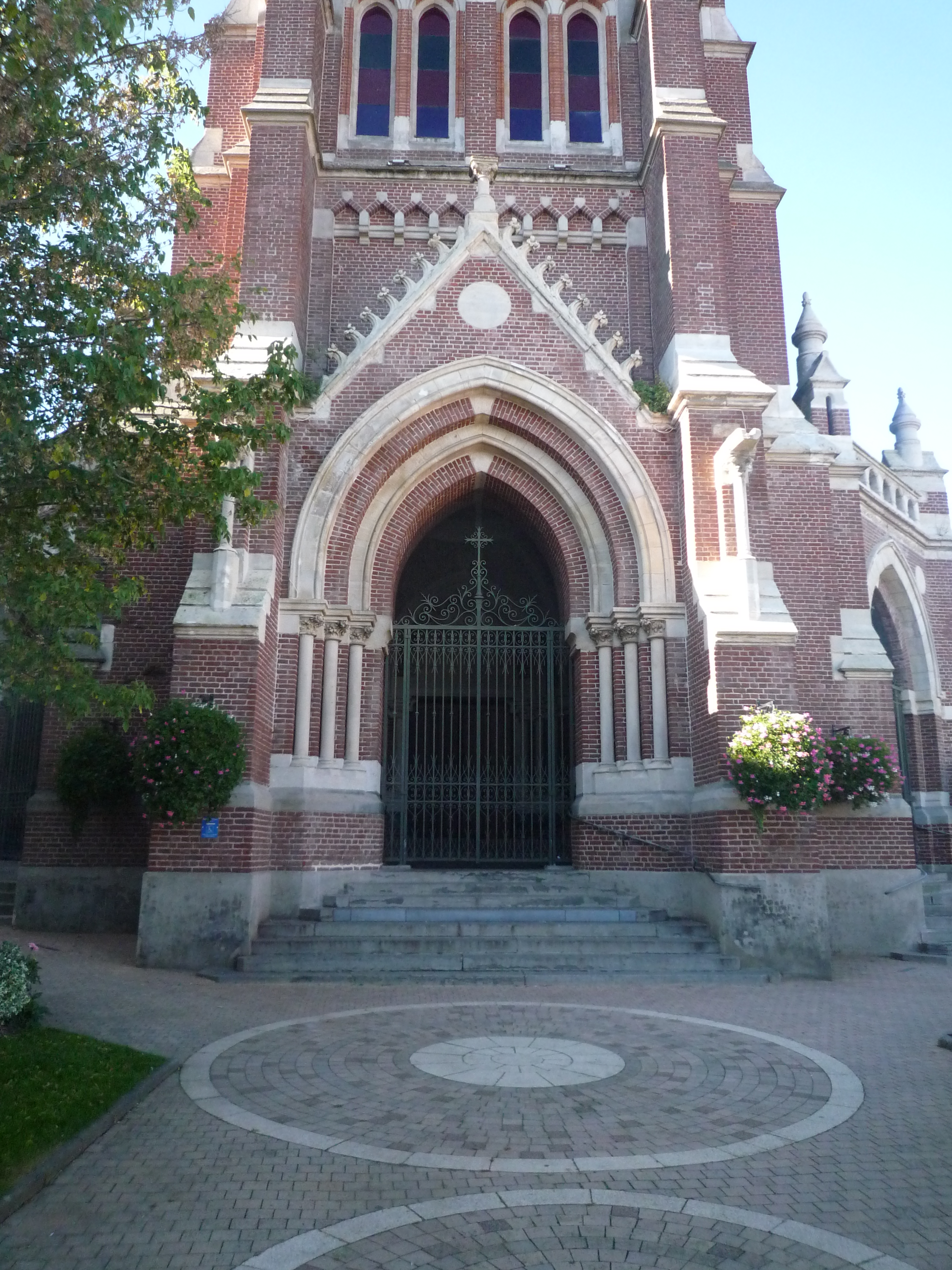

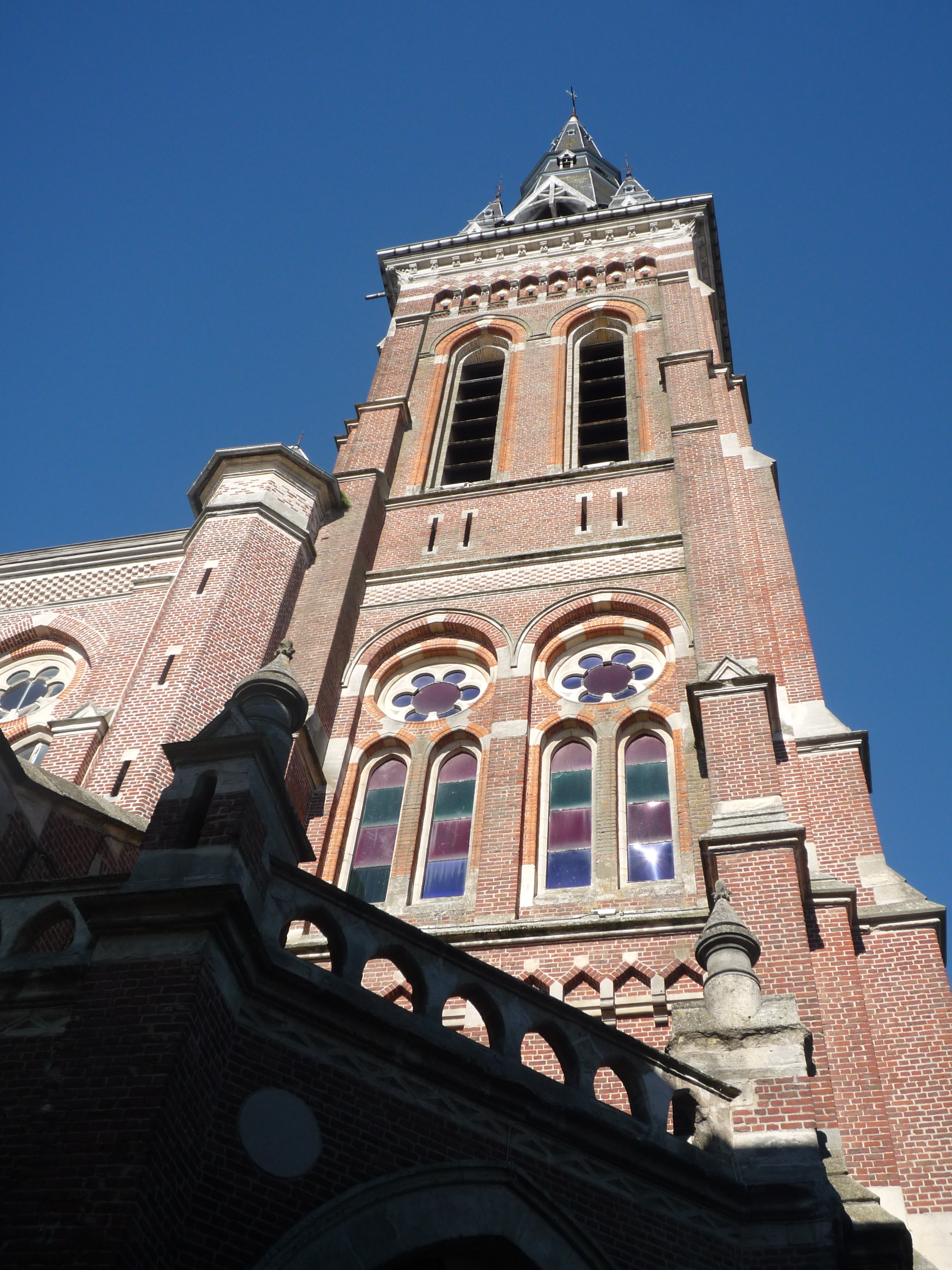

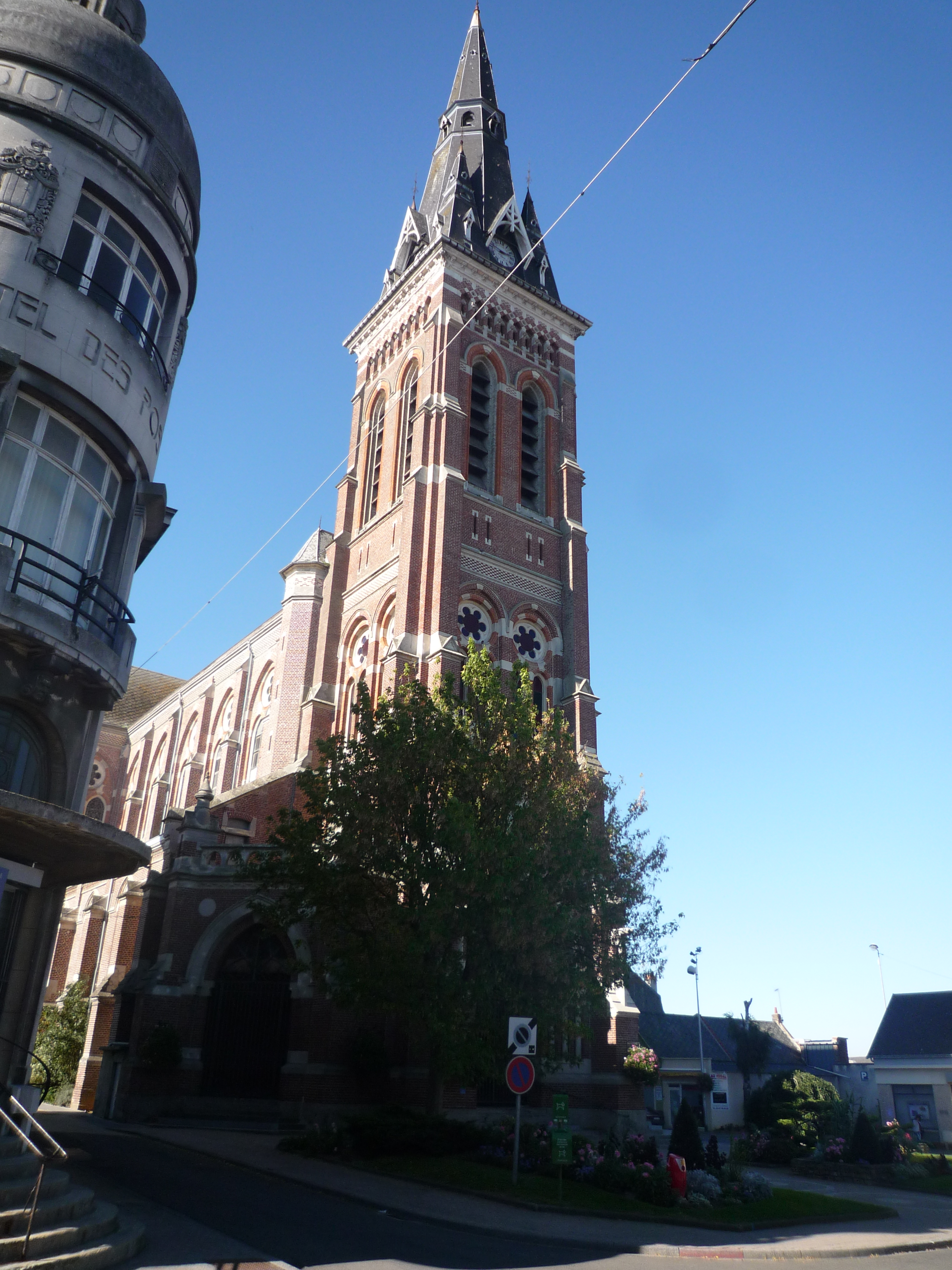

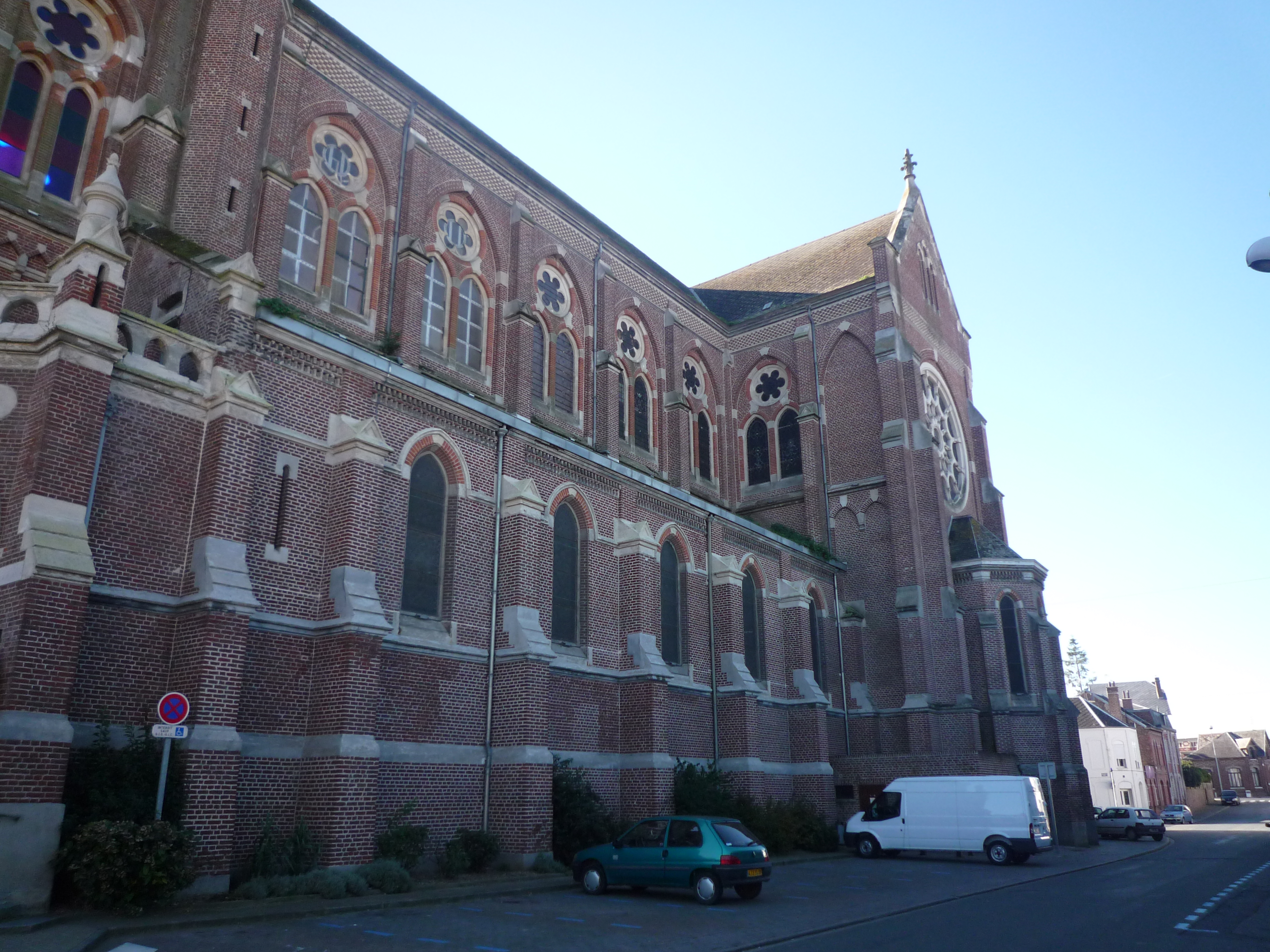

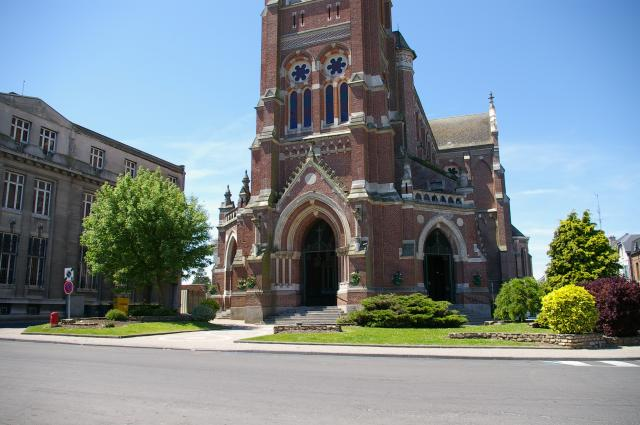

== "Prayer to Saint-Maxellende". ==
"St. Maxellende, virgin and martyr, you who have healed your murderer who had become blind, preserve us the precious gift of sight, heal those who are deprived of it, or who are in danger of losing it. Above all, obtain the light of the mind and the heart so that we may always walk on the paths of the Gospel. You who wanted to devote yourself to God enlighten those who seek their way here below. With the support of your prayer, they further peace and fulfill their vocation. Amen."
