= Caudry =

- Commune
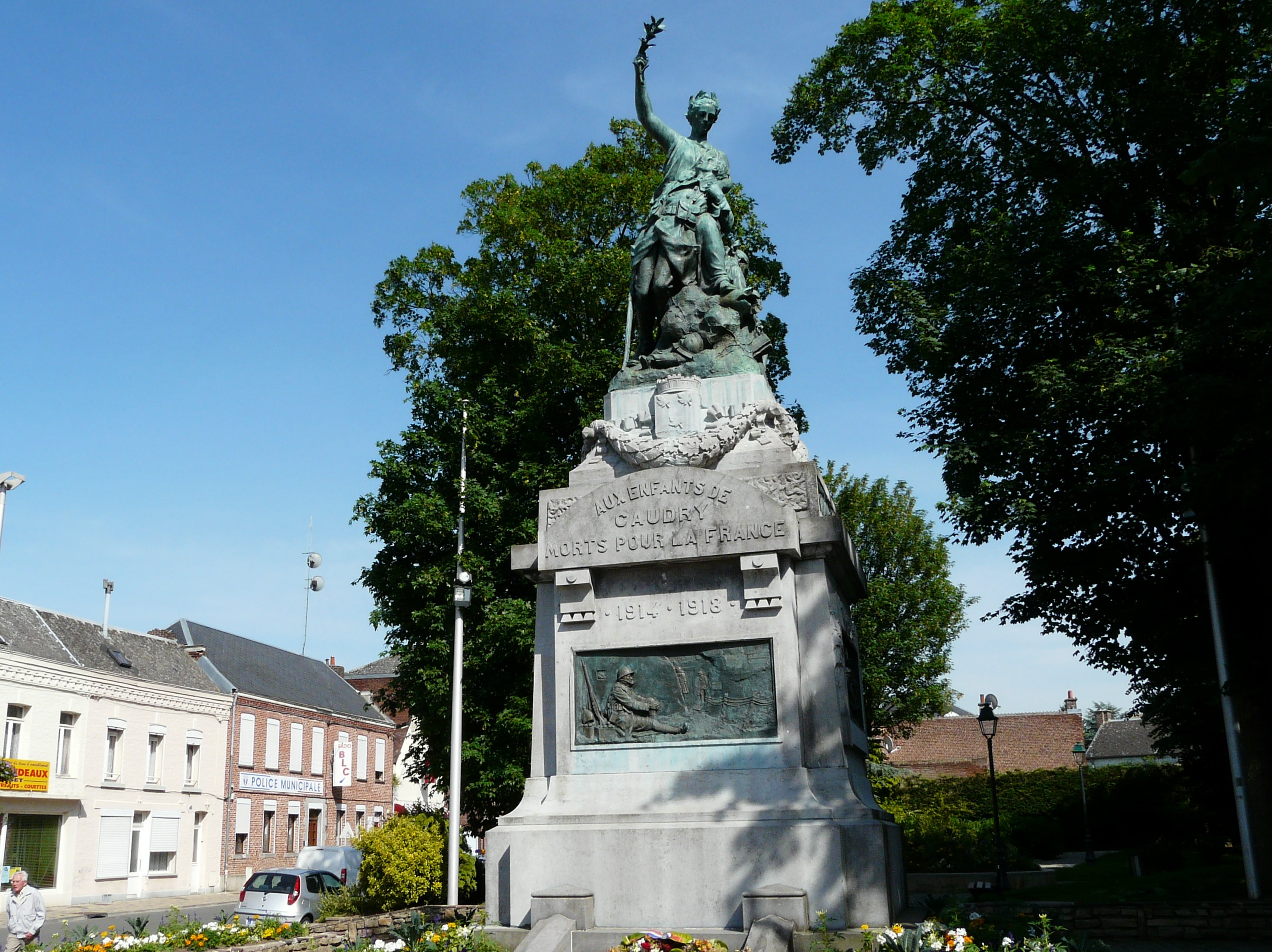
- The war memorial in Caudry

- Coat of arms
- Location of Caudry
- Location within France Location within Hauts-de-France
- Coordinates: 50°07′33″N 3°24′45″E
- Country: France
- Region: Hauts-de-France
- Department: Nord
- Arrondissement: Cambrai
- Canton: Caudry
- Intercommunality: CA Caudrésis–Catésis

Government
  - Mayor (2020–2026): Frédéric Bricout
- Area^{1}: 12.94 km^{2} (5.00 sq mi)
- Highest elevation: 138 m (453 ft)
- Lowest elevation: 103 m (338 ft)
- Population (2023): 13,833
  - Density: 1,069/km^{2} (2,769/sq mi)
- Demonym: Caudrésiens
- Time zone: UTC+01:00 (CET)
  - Summer (DST): UTC+02:00 (CEST)
- INSEE/Postal code: 59139 /59540
- ^{1} French Land Register data, which excludes lakes, ponds, glaciers > 1 km^{2} (0.386 sq mi or 247 acres) and river estuaries.

Caudry (French pronunciation: [kodʁi]) is a commune in the Nord department in northern France. Its inhabitants are called the 'Caudrésiens'. The town is mostly known as the Capital City of French Lace (along with Calais). Caudry station has rail connections to Douai, Cambrai, Paris, Lille and Saint-Quentin.

== Toponymy ==
The city of Caudry has not always carried its current name. However, this last derives from the previous appellations of the city:

- Calderiacum since 1087.
- Caudris since 1129.
- Cauderi since 1219.
- Caudri-en-Borneville.
- Caudri since 1286.
- Caudry since 1349.

== History ==
In the Middle Ages, as tradition will have it, Maxellende, a daughter of the lord of Caudry, was stabbed to death by one Harduin d'Amerval on 13 November 670 after turning him down. Following this Harduin became blind. However it is said that he recovered his sight as his victim's body was carried past him during its translation. Since then Maxellende has been the patron saint of Caudry and of the blind or partially sighted.

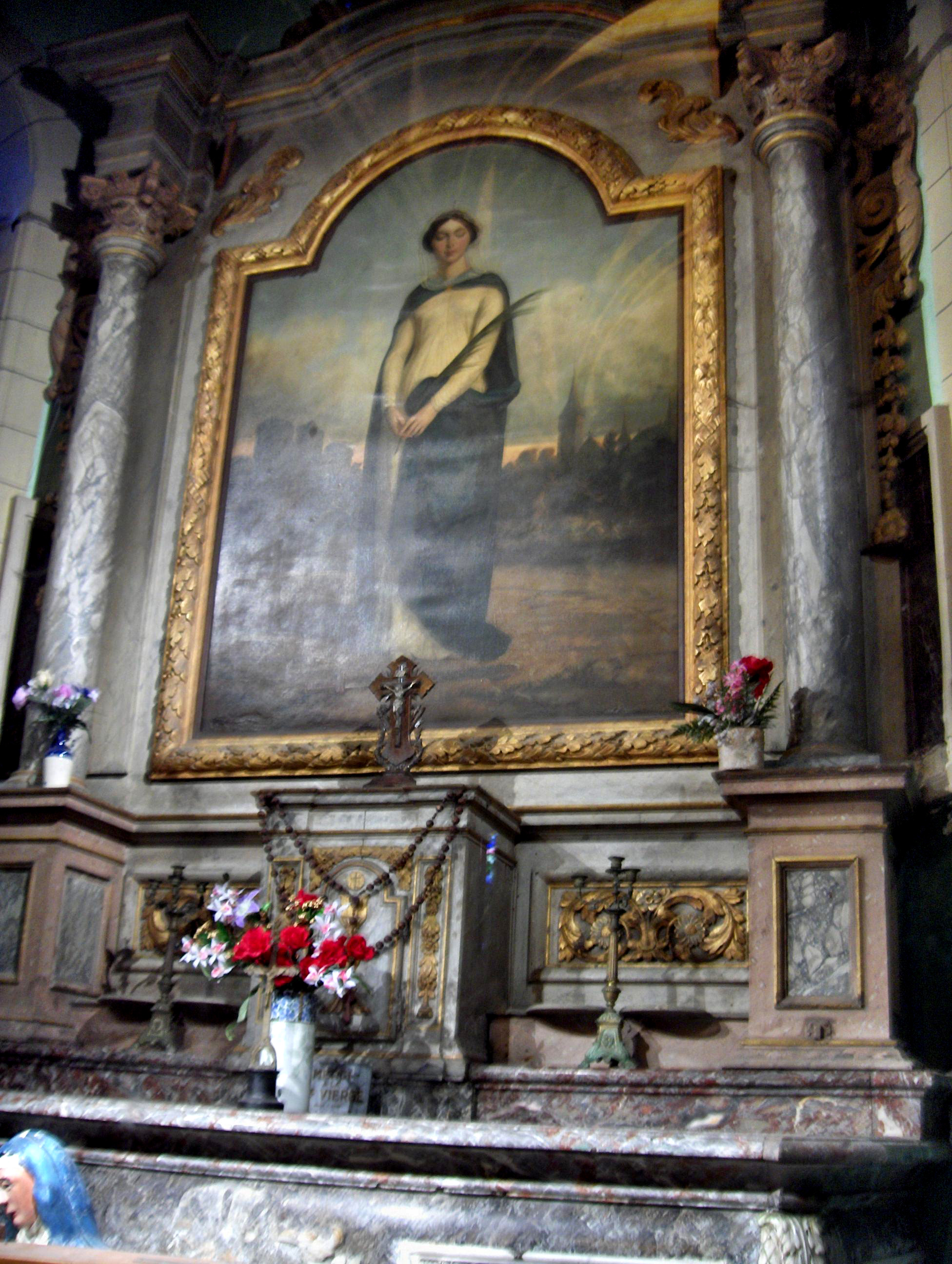
Altarpiece with Saint Maxellende in the nearby town of Le Cateau-Cambrésis

In the 19th century Caudry started specializing in tulle and lace making.

The first loom was installed in 1826 with parts smuggled from England. By 1913 there were some 650 looms employing several thousand workers. The population expanded from 1,926 in 1804 to 13,360 in 1911.

Caudry was shelled and burnt during the August 1914 Battle of Le Cateau, where it was on the left flank of the line of the retreating British Expeditionary Force. It remained under German occupation until recaptured in late 1918.

Today Caudry remains, with Calais, the only town in France where lace is still made. A lace museum has been opened in a former workshop in the town centre.

== Lords (Seigneuries) ==
Many different Lords (French: Seigneurs) owned Caudry's lands and properties and had administrative power over the town. The following are the Lords of Caudry (French: Seigneurs de Caudry) chronologically ordered:

- Almaric de Caudry (1007).
- Amulric de Caudry (1078).
- Mathieu de Caudry (1140).
- Alondus de Fontaines, Régnier de Beaumont, Adam de Caudry (1150).
- Adam de Caudry, vassal of Adam de Walincourt (1207).
- Lambert de Caudry, married to Agnès de Héripont (1219).
- Gérard de Saint-Aubert, Régnier de Beaumont (1220).
- Alulphus de Caudry, Chevalier (1223).
- Adam de Caudry (1227).
- Jean Flamen, Seigneur de Caudry et de la Sotière (1233).
- Adam de Caudry (1239).
- Jean de l'aitre (1241).
- Adam Kight and Lord of Caudry (1249).
- Mathieu de Caudry (1272).
- Adam, Sire de Caudry (1278).
- Jean de Brebière, became 'Lord of Caudry' by having married Alys, Adam de Caudry (1315)'s daughter.
- Jacques de Haspres, became 'Lord of Caudry' by having married Marie, Adam de Caudry (1322)'s other daughter.
- Adam Flament, Seigneur de Caudry (1347).
- Adam, dit Flament, Seigneur de Caudry, bailli du Cambrésis (1360).
- Pierre de Caudry (died in 1424).
- Guillaume de Viefville, Lord of Romeries and Caudry (1530).
- Pierre de Viefville (1570).
- Charles de Viefville (1635).
- Charles de Lignières (1672).
- Félix-Ignace-Guillaume de Taffin, Lord of Troisvilles, bought the 'Seigneurie de Caudry' (1755).
- Charles-Augustin-Hyacinthe Cordier, bought the 'Seigneurie de Caudry' then the one of Potelle and Borneville (1763). He was the last Lord of Caudry.

== Population ==
Historical population
Year	Pop.	±% p.a.
1968	13,328	—
1975	13,579	+0.27%
1982	14,095	+0.53%
1990	13,579	−0.47%
1999	13,469	−0.09%
2007	13,842	+0.34%
2012	14,586	+1.05%
2017	14,591	+0.01%
2023	13,833	−0.89%
Source: INSEE

== Lace ==
The city is mostly known as the Capital City of French Lace (along with Calais) and is considered a landmark of French sartorial heritage and high craftsmanship for its art of weaving the finest and most precious fabrics (including Chantilly lace, Leavers lace, silk or tulle) through its centuries-old textile industry. The city is a lead supplier for luxury fashion houses such as Chanel or Gucci. The city also supplies brands such as Yves Saint Laurent, Dolce & Gabbana, La Perla, Alexander McQueen or Ralph Lauren. In recent history, among the most internationally publicized creations made out of Caudry's lace were Catherine, Duchess of Cambridge's wedding gown worn while marrying Prince William, Duke of Cambridge in Westminster Abbey on 29 April 2011 or Amal Clooney's wedding dress worn in September 2014 in Venice, Italy while marrying American actor George Clooney. Numerous artists and politicians such as Lady Gaga, Beyonce or Michelle Obama have worn Caudry's lace.

=== Film Industries ===
Since 1910, Caudry's lace industries have closely collaborated with costume designers working for stage productions and film industries within Hollywood; the Cinema of Europe; East Asian cinema (particularly the cinema of Japan, China, Hong Kong, Taiwan and South Korea); Bollywood and West Asian cinemas (Iranian cinema, Israeli cinema, Jewish cinema and Turkish cinema). Caudry's lace and textile creations were used in hundreds of films such as in Luc Besson's The Extraordinary Adventures of Adèle Blanc-Sec (2010), The Hunger Games (film series) starring Jennifer Lawrence (2012-2015) or Sam Mendes's Skyfall (2012) part of the James Bond series and starring Daniel Craig. In 2013, costume designer Catherine Martin earned the Academy Award for Best Costume Design as well as the Academy Award for Best Production Design for her work on Baz Luhrmann's The Great Gatsby (2014) starring Leonardo DiCaprio. The dresses created for this film and notably the ones worn by Carey Mulligan were made with 1,400 meters of lace made in Caudry. Martin chose 210 drawings, out of 8,000 available.

== Notable people ==
- André Piettre (1906-1994) - French economist, born in Caudry.
- Lucien Janssoone (1898-1944) - French Resistant, director of the ‘Complementary Classes For Boys’ in Caudry from October 1933, shot in 1944.
- Charles Lemaire (born 1985) – French actor from Caudry.
- Arthur Ramette (born in Caudry, Nord, on 12 October 1897 - 15 December 1988) was a French mechanic, communist and politician. He was a leading representative of the French Communist Party in the National Assembly both before and after World War II (1939–45).
- Gaston Pigot (1885 - 1969) - French boxer, born in Caudry.
- Lucienne Bogaert (1892-1983) - (born Lucienne Jeanne Gabrielle Lefebvre; 6 January 1892 in Caudry, Nord – 4 February 1983 in Montrouge, Hauts-de-Seine) was a French actress.
- Léonce Bajart (1888-1983) - French Resistant and Caudresian personality, died in Caudry. (Knight of the National Order of the Legion of Honour - 1937; Commander of the Ordre des Palmes Académiques – 1959; Medal of Honour of the City of Caudry – 1953).
- Eugène Fiévet (1867-1910) - French politician, mayor of Caudry, general councilor and deputy of the North, born and died in Caudry.
- Charles de Lignières (or Carolus de Lignieres), Lord of Caudry from 1672 to 1755.

== Twin towns ==
Caudry is twinned with:

- Wedel, Germany

== See also ==
- Communes of the Nord department
