= Gunhild Haraldsdatter =

Sister of Sweyn Forkbeard, King of Denmark

Gunhild Haraldsdatter (also spelled Gunhilde or Gunnhild) (died 13 November 1002) is said to have been the sister of Sweyn Forkbeard, King of Denmark, and the daughter of Harald Bluetooth. She is said to have been the wife of Pallig, a Dane who served the King of England, Æthelred the Unready, as ealdorman of Devonshire.

She is supposed to have been a hostage in England when she was killed in the St. Brice's Day massacre, ordered by Æthelred. Pallig is reported alternatively to have been killed in the massacre or to have provoked the massacre by deserting Æthelred's service.

Historians are divided about the strength of the evidence that she was Sweyn Forkbeard's sister. Ryan Lavelle is sceptical of the reliability of the later medieval sources, such as the Chronicle of John of Wallingford, which mention her. The historian Ann Williams observes that William of Malmesbury is the sole source for Gunhild, and that his account points to a later date for her death than 1002. She thinks that the story is probably a myth and that Gunhild did not exist. However, Frank Stenton described the claim as a "well recorded tradition", and considered that a desire to avenge her death was probably a principal motive for Sweyn's invasion of England in 1003, leading to the eventual conquest of England by his son Cnut.

== Sources ==
- Freeman, Edward Augustus (1867). The History of the Norman Conquest of England: Its Causes and Its Results. Vol. I. Cambridge University Press.
- Lavelle, Ryan (2008). Aethelred II: King of the English. The History Press.
- Stenton, Frank (1971). Anglo-Saxon England (Third ed.). Oxford University Press.
- Williams, Ann (2003). Athelred the Unready: The Ill-Counselled King. Hambledon and London.
