= St Brice's Day massacre =

1002 mass killing of Danes in England

The St Brice's Day massacre was a mass killing of Danes within England on 13 November 1002, on the order of King Æthelred the Unready of England. The Anglo-Saxon Chronicle relates that the massacre was carried out in response to an accusation that the Danes would "beshrew [Æthelred] of his life, and afterwards all his council, and then have his kingdom without any resistance". Æthelred thus ordered the killing of many Danes within his territory. Some historians think that the invasions of England by the Danish king, Swein Forkbeard, over the following years were in retaliation for the massacre.

The skeletons of 37 young men and juveniles, found during an excavation at St John's College, Oxford, in 2008 were presumed to be victims of the massacre.

== Background ==
The name (Danish: Danemordet, Massakren på Sankt Brictiusdag) refers to St Brice, fifth-century Bishop of Tours, whose feast day is 13 November. After several decades of relative peace, Danish raids on English territory began again in earnest in the 980s, becoming markedly more serious in the early 990s. Following the Battle of Maldon in 991, Æthelred paid tribute, or Danegeld, to the Danish king. Æthelred married Emma of Normandy in 1002, daughter of Richard I of Normandy; her mother was a Dane named Gunnor, and their son became Edward the Confessor. Some Danes had arrived as traders and intermarried with the Anglo-Saxon population, while others settled in Wessex, becoming farmers and raising families in Anglo-Saxon-controlled areas of England. Meanwhile, Æthelred's kingdom had been ravaged by Danish raids every year from 997 to 1001; in 1001 a Danish army rampaged across southern England, indiscriminately burning many towns and inflicting a series of defeats on Anglo-Saxon forces that had been raised to oppose them.

== The massacre ==
In 1002 Æthelred was told that the Danish men in his territory "would faithlessly take his life, and then all his councillors, and possess his kingdom afterwards". In response, "the king gave an order to slay all the Danes that were in England."

It is generally assumed by historians that this decree was not an indiscriminate call for the extermination of England's Danish population, but targeted the belligerent Danish army, recent settlers, and remnants of Æthelred's own mercenary force, some of whom had proved fickle and disloyal by joining the Danish invaders. Although the later Norman chronicler William of Jumièges claims that the entire Anglo-Danish population—including men, women, and children—were targeted, modern historians hold this to be a non-contemporary exaggeration, as there is no contemporary evidence of widespread slaughter, and the 12th century historian Henry of Huntingdon claimed that only Danish men in certain towns and regions were attacked by Æthelred's men. Historian Ian Howard assumes that no more than a few hundred Danes were killed, and that the victims were nearly all members of the invading army and their families.

Historians believe there was noteworthy loss of life, though evidence is lacking on any specific estimates. The twelfth-century historian William of Malmesbury stated that Gunhilde, the sister of Swein Forkbeard, the King of Denmark, was a victim along with her husband Pallig, but William is the only source for Gunhilde's existence and Pallig deserted the English before the massacre. The historian Ann Williams thinks that the story is a myth. Pallig took part in raids on the south coast.

== Oxford massacre ==
The massacre in Oxford was referred to by Æthelred in a royal charter of 1004 as "a most just extermination" of Danes who had settled and "sprung up in this island". He goes on to proclaim it was with God's aid he rebuilt St Frideswide's Church (now Christ Church Cathedral):

For it is fully agreed that to all dwelling in this country it will be well known that, since a decree was sent out by me with the counsel of my leading men and magnates, to the effect that all the Danes who had sprung up in this island, sprouting like cockle amongst the wheat, were to be destroyed by a most just extermination, and thus this decree was to be put into effect even as far as death, those Danes who dwelt in the afore-mentioned town, striving to escape death, entered this sanctuary of Christ, having broken by force the doors and bolts, and resolved to make refuge and defence for themselves therein against the people of the town and the suburbs; but when all the people in pursuit strove, forced by necessity, to drive them out, and could not, they set fire to the planks and burnt, as it seems, this church with its ornaments and its books. Afterwards, with God's aid, it was renewed by me.

During an excavation at St John's College, Oxford, in 2008, archaeologists found the remains of 37 people who had been massacred. All of them appeared to be male, apart from two who were too young for their sex to be identified, and most were aged 16 to 25. Chemical analysis carried out in 2012 by Oxford University researchers suggests that the remains are Viking; older scars on some of the bones suggest a mixture of settlers and "Danes who had sprung up in this island", including some who had old battle scars; the site's chief archaeologist concluded the victims had no defensive wounds, were unarmed, and were killed while running away from being burned alive in the church, with wounds on the back. The bodies show evidence of multiple serious injuries caused by a range of weapons. Their manner of death was a frenzied attack while defenceless by more than one attacker and from all sides of the body. Charring on the bones is consistent with historical records of the church burning (see above). DNA testing of one of the bodies closely matched it with the remains of a man who had been excavated in Otterup, on the Island of Funen in Denmark, suggesting that they were either half-brothers or uncle and nephew. Three bodies produced radiocarbon dates of 885-995, but analysis of bone chemistry showed that they had a diet high in fish, and adjusting for this changed the date range to 974-1032, compatible with the St Brice's Day Massacre, but also with the burning of Oxford by the Vikings in 1009.

The Ridgeway Hill Viking burial pit near Weymouth, Dorset, a site dated as being between 970 and 1038 AD discovered when building a new relief road, contained 54 Scandinavian males all beheaded, suggesting a mass execution that may be linked to Oxford and the decree by Æthelred.

== Historians' views ==
Some historians, such as Frank Stenton, have viewed the massacre as a political act which helped to provoke Sweyn's invasion of 1003. Audrey MacDonald states the massacre eventually led to the accession of Cnut in 1016. Levi Roach states, "These purges bred suspicion and division at a critical moment, and in the end [Æthelred's] death was soon followed by the conquest of England by the Danish ruler Cnut."

Other historians are more sympathetic to Æthelred. Simon Keynes in his Oxford Online DNB article on Æthelred described it as the reaction of a people who had suffered under repeated Danish attacks through mercenaries who had turned on their employers. Ian Howard believes the massacre was committed in response to the treachery of Æthelred's mercenary army, and Barbara Yorke describes it as "the type of hard-hitting reply that was necessary in a world inhabited by Vikings."

Æthelred's biographer Ryan Lavelle suggests that the massacre was probably confined to frontier towns such as Oxford, and larger towns with small Danish communities, such as Bristol, Gloucester and London within territory under Æthelred's control, noting lack of remorse shown in the Oxford charter which exploited ethnic hatred and millenarianism. It is clear that the massacre was not widespread. Numerous historians agree that not only was a campaign of widespread extermination across all of England implausible, but that there is extremely limited archaeological or historical evidence for wholesale slaughter. The killing in Oxford almost exclusively targeted males of military age. Historian Levi Roach also notes that it is impossible to conclusively link the mass grave in Oxford and those elsewhere to St. Brice's day, as there was regular sectarian violence across England during this period. That the Danelaw remained calm and content under Æthelred's hegemony has been taken as evidence that the killings were local to certain areas at best. "Needless to say," writes Ann Williams, "the decree was not aimed at the English of Scandinavian descent living in the eastern shires." Only a few years after the massacre, Æthelred granted land to a Dane named Toti outside Oxford, and many Scandinavian figures remained at his court, demonstrating that the St Brice's Day decree was not an order for a general extermination.

== See also ==
- House of Knýtlinga
- List of massacres in Great Britain
