= Pallig =

Brother In-Law of Eric Forkbeard, King of Denmark

Pallig (fl. 1001) was a Danish chieftain who joined the service of King Æthelred the Unready of England but deserted to join a Viking raid. He was said to have been the husband of Gunhilde, the sister of Sweyn Forkbeard, and to have been killed along with her in the St Brice's Day massacre in 1002.

== Betrayal ==
According to the 'A' manuscript of the Anglo-Saxon Chronicle, in 1001 a Danish naval force defeated the people of Hampshire.

And then they went west from there until they reached Devon; and Pallig came to meet them there with the ships which he could collect, because he had deserted King Æthelred in spite of all the pledges which he had given him. And the king had made great gifts to him, in estates and gold and silver. And they burnt Teignton and also many other good residences which we cannot name, and afterwards peace was made with them.

In 1002 Æthelred ordered the slaughter of all Danes in England in the St Brice's Day massacre, although the number of deaths was limited. The massacre was portrayed in later medieval sources as revenge for Pallig's treachery, and this view is accepted by some historians.

== Death ==
Sweyn Forkbeard raided England periodically from the beginning of the century, and in 1013 invaded and conquered England. According to William of Malmesbury, Sweyn's principal motive in 1013 was to avenge the death of his sister Gunhilde, who had been murdered together with her husband Pallig and son, together with "the other Danes", on the order of Eadric Streona. William is usually interpreted by historians as saying that Pallig was killed in the St Brice's Day massacre, but this is disputed by Ann Williams. She argues that as William mentions the deaths in connection with the invasion of 1013 and attributes them to Eadric Streona, who was not appointed an ealdorman until 1007, it is likely that William was referring to a date later than the St Brice's Day massacre. She questions whether the murder took place and whether Gunnhild existed, as William is the sole source for her marriage to Pallig and her relationship to Sweyn.
